= Pauline Lefèvre-Utile =

French businesswoman (1830–1922)

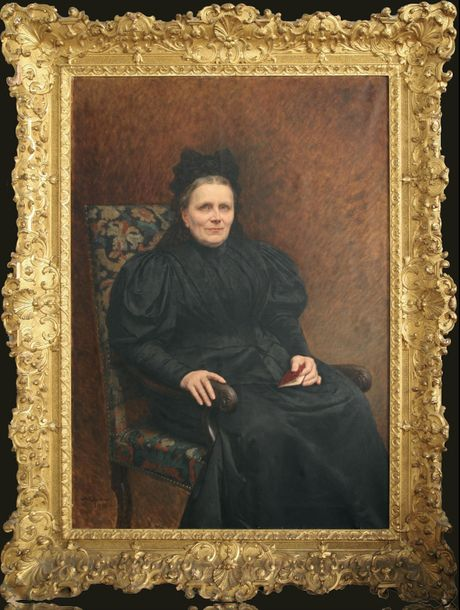
- Born: 30 June 1830; Marle, Aisne, France
- Died: 5 April 1922 (aged 91); Nantes, France
- Known for: Co-founder of Lefèvre Utile (LU)
- Spouse: Jean-Romain Lefèvre (m. 1850)
- Children: 4

Pauline Isabelle Lefèvre-Utile (née Utile; 30 June 1830 – 5 April 1922) founded the Lefèvre Utile (LU) company with her husband Jean-Romain Lefèvre in 1854.

== Early life and marriage ==
Pauline Isabelle Utile was born on 30 June 1830 in Marle, in the department of Aisne, to Catherine Marie Adélaide (née Picart; 1798–1879) and Jean Baptiste Désiré Utile (1792 – c. 1858), a mounted gendarme and later an annuitant following an inheritance. At the age of sixteen, her parents sent her to live with two of her aunts in Varennes-en-Argonne and work as a demoiselle de boutique (shop girl). This practice developed in the 19th century and enabled women to find work and build up their own dowries. This work enabled her to acquire the experience, skills and part of the finances that were to play a decisive role in the foundation of the LU biscuit empire.

Pauline Utile married Jean-Romain Lefèvre from Meuse on 7 September 1850. They moved to Nantes and had four children: Ernest (1851-1939), Auguste (1854), Pauline (1855-1894), and Louis (1858-1940) who later took over managing the company and invented the Petit Beurre after studying biscuit manufacturing in Britain.

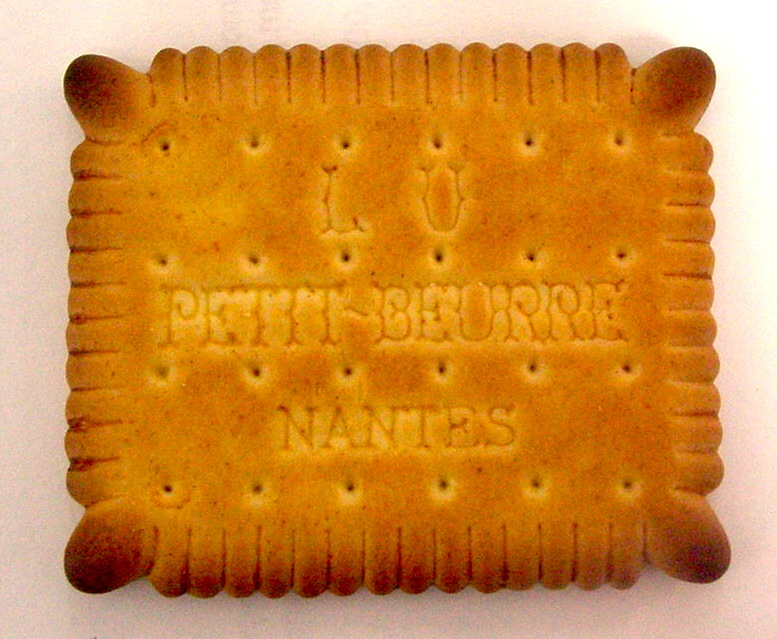
Petit Beurre LU

== Foundation of the LU biscuit company ==
As early as 1846, Jean-Romain Lefèvre had offered English biscuits from Huntley & Palmers for sale alongside his own recipes, in his pâtisserie shop at 5 rue Boileau in Nantes.

In 1850, the couple became owners of the shop and named it Fabrique de biscuits de Reims et de bonbons secs. Pauline Lefèvre-Utile was in charge of the management of the shop and the commercial aspects of the family business. Her skills and experience of retail contributed greatly to the development of their business. Her dowry enabled the couple to acquire the neighbouring premises at number 7 rue Boileau. The shop's sign combined the couple's two surnames, Lefèvre and Utile. This was the beginning of the maison LU.

The shop had a reputation for quality products, but also for its architecture and decor. It is vast (150 m2) with high ceilings, beautiful mouldings and chandeliers, and wood panelling on the walls, giving the whole space an upmarket and refined character. The products sold included Biscuits de Reims, boudoirs, les biscuits champagne, langue de chat, macarons, vanilla biscuits, marzipan and almond petit fours. The products were arranged in crystal bowls with feet and elegant display stands. Waitresses welcome customers who picked the products they required, which were then picked up using tongs, (a rare occurrence at the time), and placed in a package designed to show them off to their best advantage. Cardboard boxes were introduced to take the products away as gifts, decorated with colourful scenes of the country or of children playing. The company employed fourteen workers in 1880.

In 1882, following the death of Jean-Romain Lefèvre, the couple's third son Louis took over the family business, aged 24. He had studied at the Lycée Clemenceau and spent time in Britain learning about the manufacture of British biscuits. Louis Lefèvre-Utile set up a first factory and later that year, the family business was awarded with a gold medal at the Nantes exhibition.

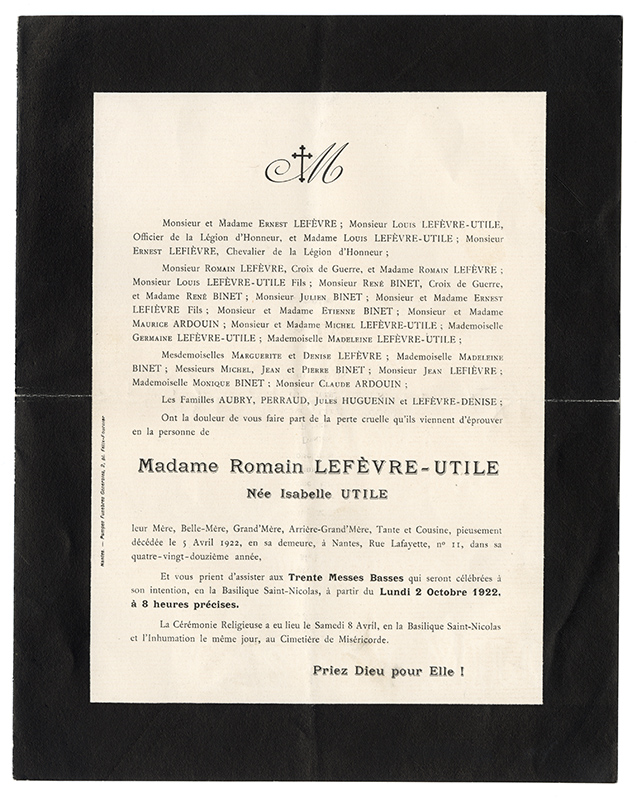
Death notice for Pauline Isabelle Utile

== Death ==
Pauline Lefèvre-Utile died on 5 April 1922 in Nantes at the age of 91.

== Recognition ==
- Honorable mention at the Nantes National Exhibition in the Biscuits category in 1861
- Gold medal at the Nantes exhibition in 1882

== Gallery ==
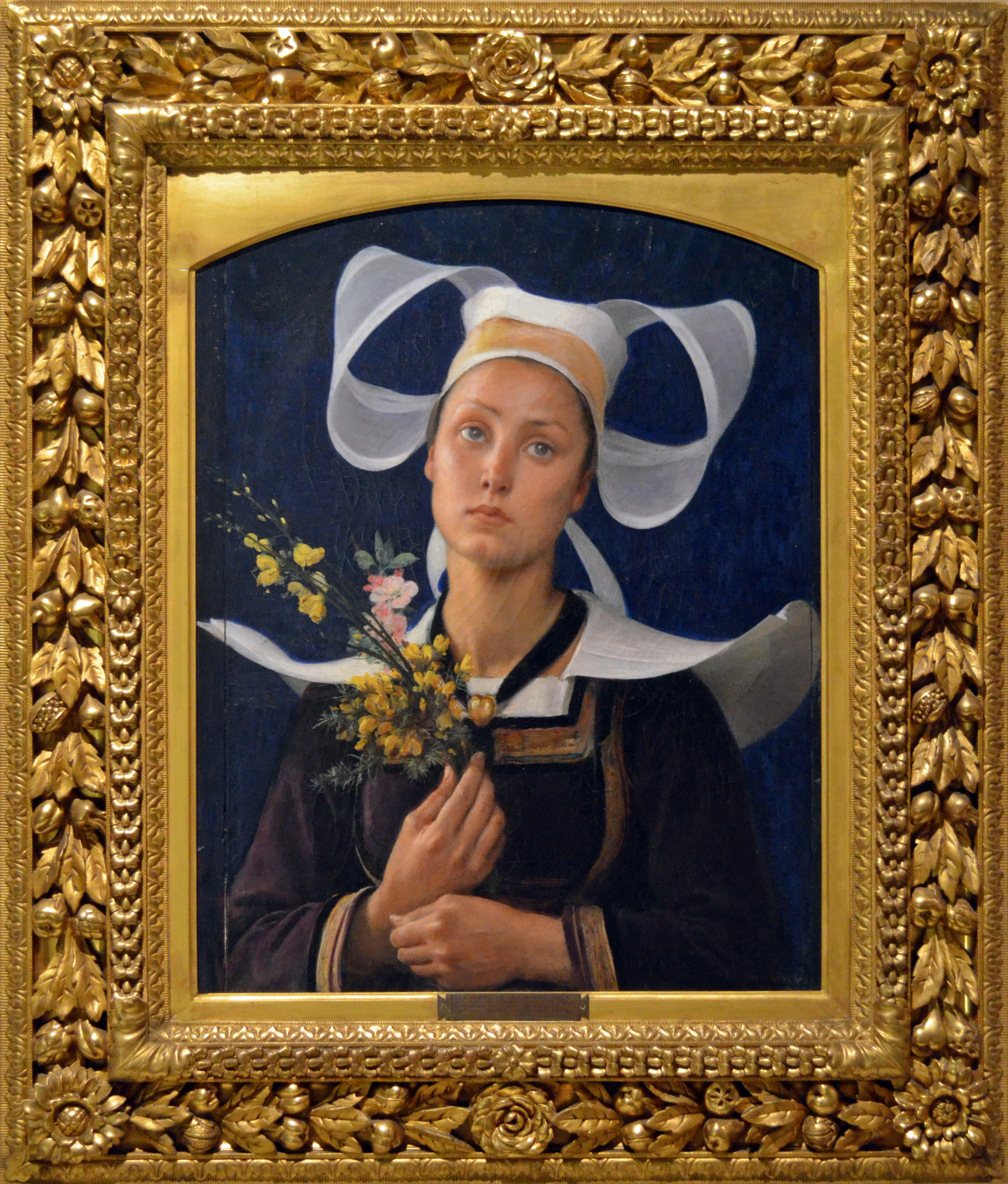
Hippolyte Berteaux - Breton icon

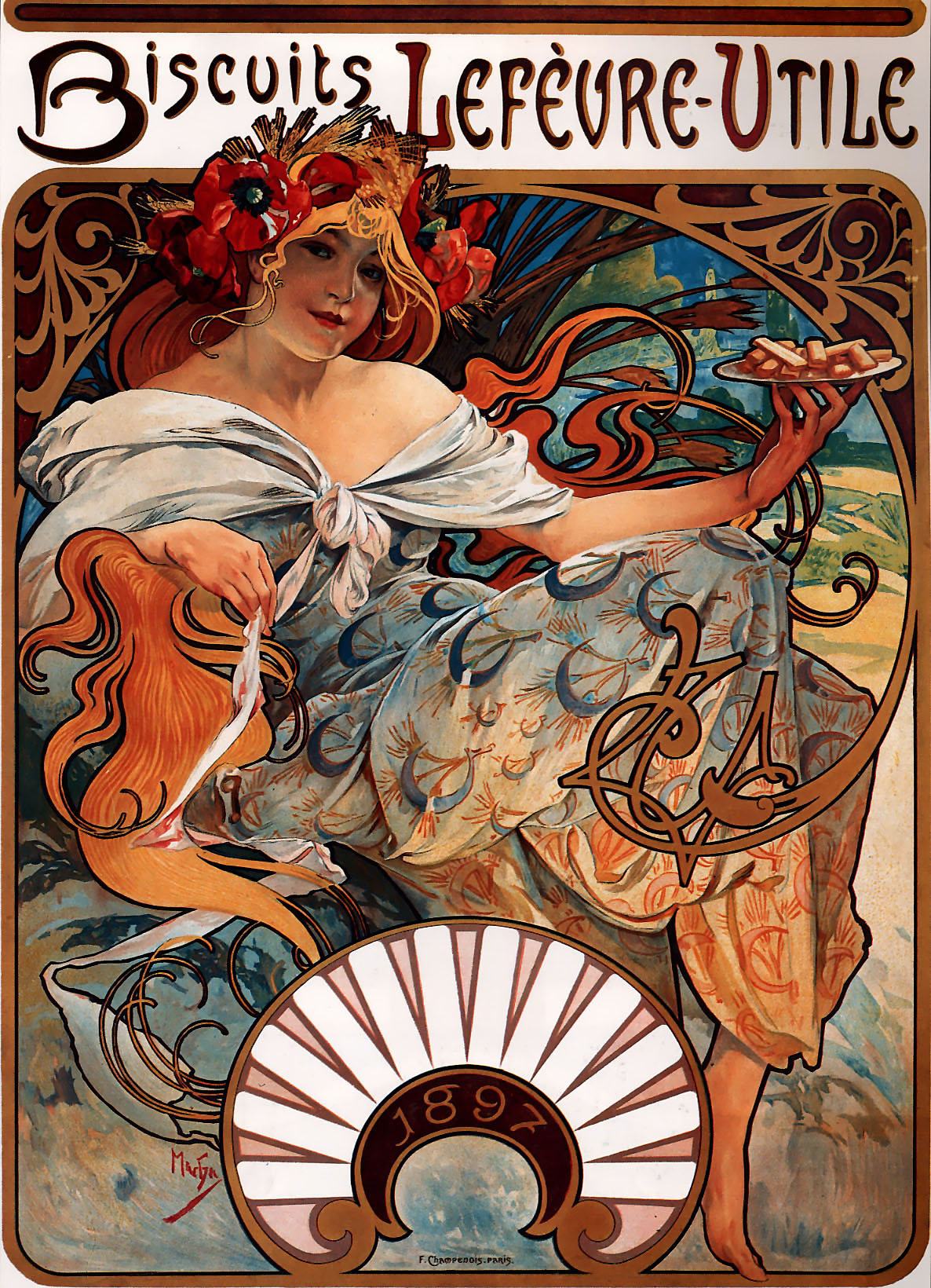
Alfons Mucha - 1896 - Biscuits Lefèvre-Utile

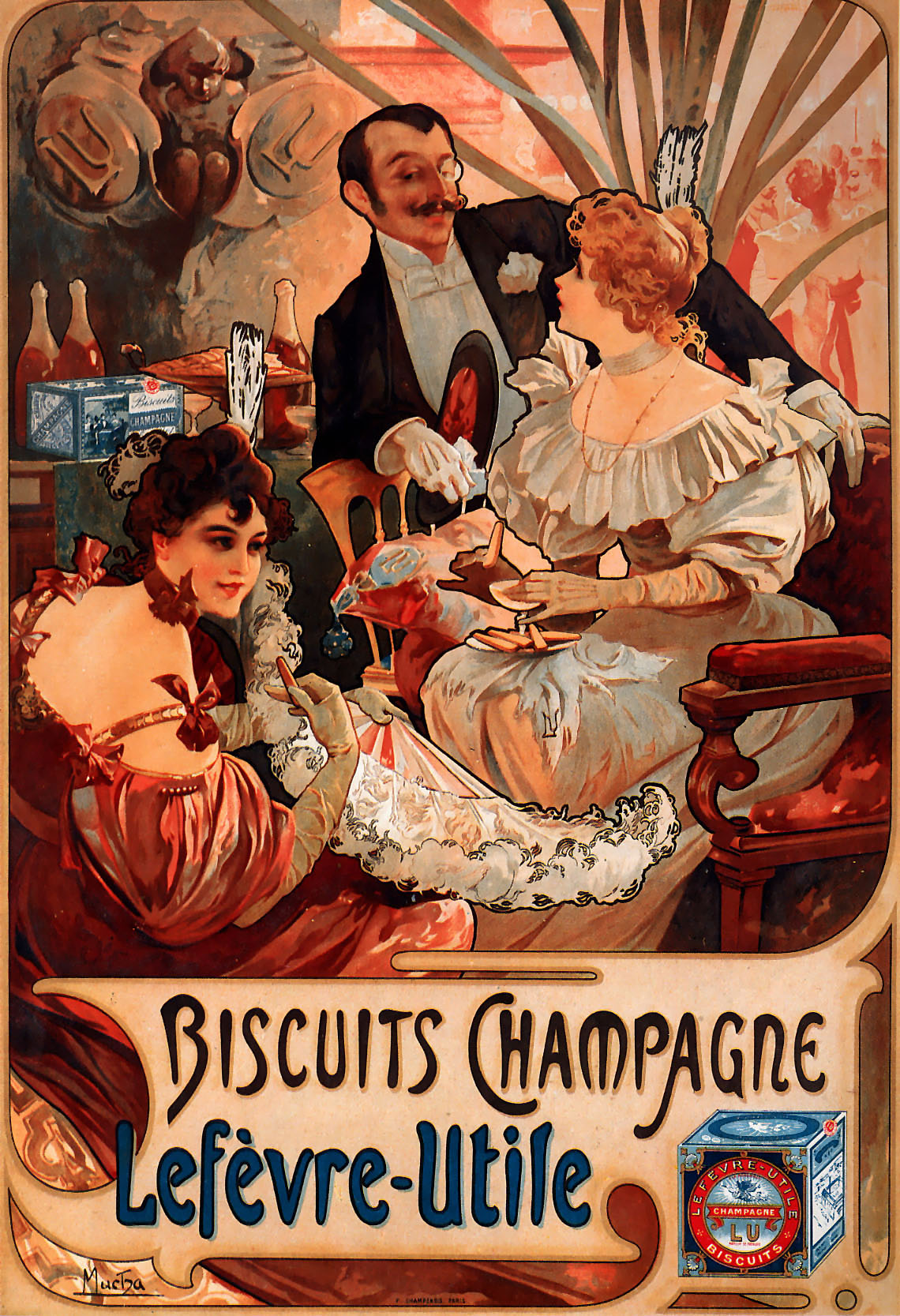
Alfons Mucha - 1896 - Biscuits Champagne-Lefèvre-Utile

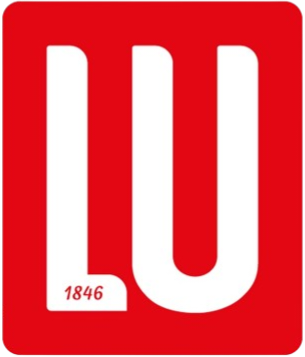
LU logo 2024
