= Jacques-Charles de Brisacier =

Jacques-Charles de Brisacier (1641 – 23 March 1736) was a French orator and ecclesiastical writer.

== Life ==
Brisacier was born in Bourges. At the age of 25, he entered the Paris Foreign Missions Society and devoted 70 years of his life to this work. The scion of a rich and prominent family, son of the collector-general for the province of Berry, chaplain in ordinary to Queen Maria Theresa of Spain, wife of Louis XIV.

Many bishoprics were offered to him, but he refused them all, in order to remain in the Foreign Missions Society of which he was elected superior in 1681. He filled this office for eight terms, but as the rule of the Society is that no one shall be elected superior for more than three consecutive years, he filled this charge alternately with Louis Tiberge. He was also one of eight of its members who in 1698 composed the rules for its government which remained in force long afterwards.

Françoise d'Aubigné asked him to become the associate of Louis Bourdaloue and François Fénelon, in compiling the regulations for the school of Saint Cyr, which she had just founded. She also asked him, in connection with Bourdeloue and Fronson, superior of Saint-Sulpice, to give his opinion on the books of Jeanne Marie Bouvier de la Motte Guyon and upon Quietism.

On this point, however, the director of the Society of the Foreign Missions did not agree with the views of Fénelon. He took a very prominent part in the discussion on Chinese ceremonies. After having asked the advice of Fénelon and Bossuet on this question, Brisacier did not hesitate to declare himself of an opinion different from that of the Jesuits. The Bishop of Meaux wrote him three letters on this subject (30 August 1701; 8 and 12 September 1701). Brisacier, however, did not wait for these letters to declare himself. On 20 April 1700, he published a pamphlet entitled Lettre de MM. des Missions étrangères au Pape, sur les idolatries et les superstitions chinoises, avec une addition à la dite lettre, par MM. Louis Tiberge and Jacques Charles de Brisacier. Brisacier pronounced the funeral orations of Marie Madeleine de Vignerot and also of Marie Anne Mancini, both benefactresses of the Foreign Missions. He died in Paris.
