= LU (biscuits) =

French brand of biscuit or cookie

Lefèvre-Utile
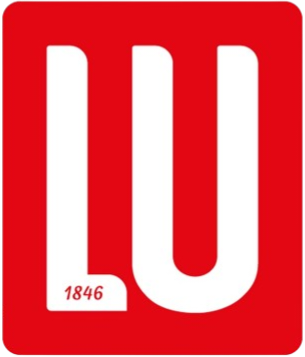

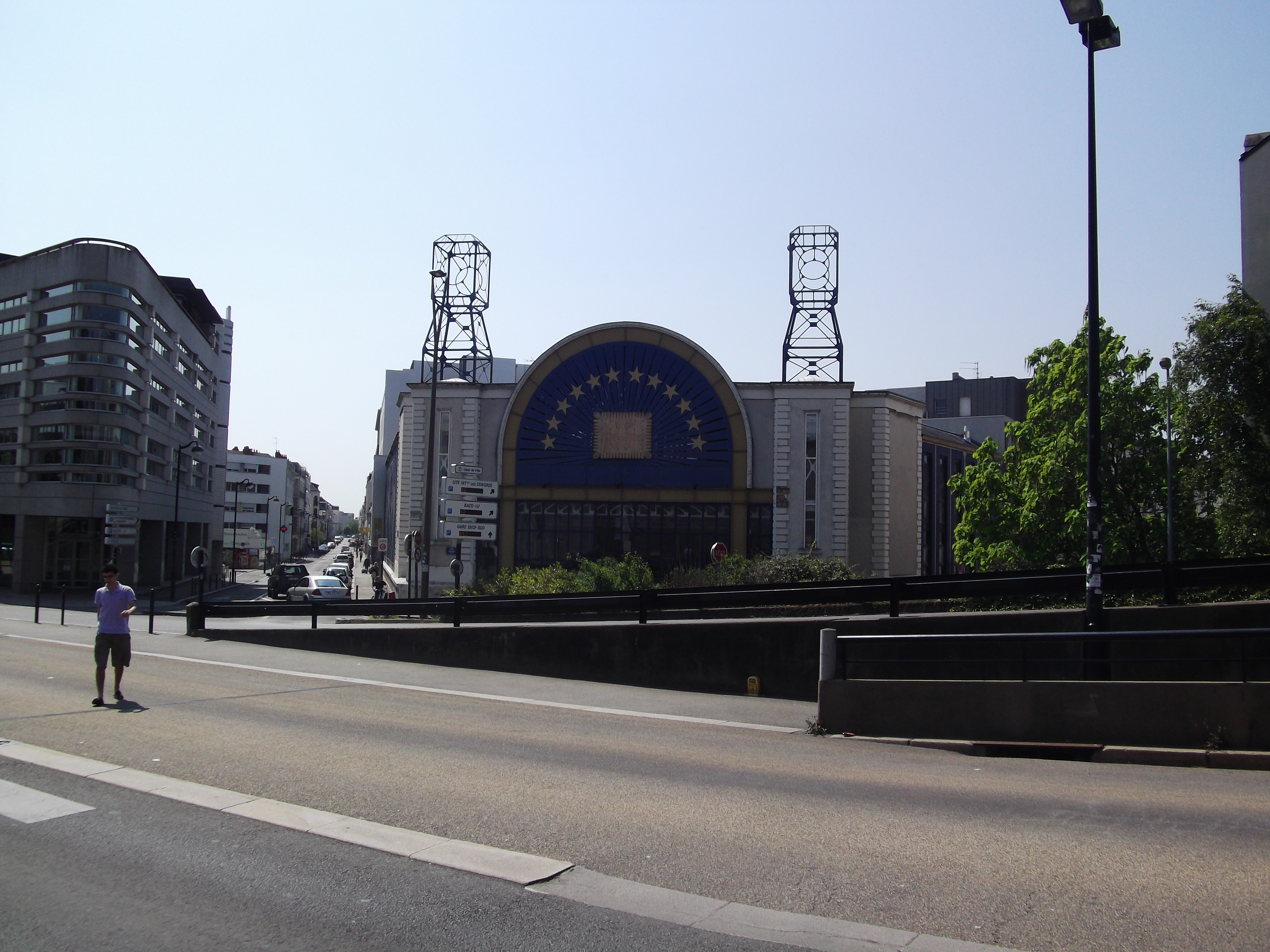
- LU factory in Nantes, pictured in 2011
- Formerly: Lefèvre-Utile Biscuit Co.
- Type: Private (1846–1986)
- Industry: Food
- Founded: 1846; 180 years ago
- Founder: Jean-Romain Lefèvre; Pauline Lefèvre-Utile; Louis Lefèvre-Utile
- Fate: Acquired by Danone in 1986, then other owners
- Headquarters: Nantes, France
- Area served: Worldwide
- Products: Biscuit
- Brands: Petit-Beurre; Prince de LU
- Parent: Mondelez (2012–pres.); Kraft Foods Inc. (2007–12); Danone (1986–2007)
- Website: lu.fr

Lefèvre-Utile, better known worldwide by the initials LU, was a French manufacturer brand of biscuits, emblematic of the city of Nantes. The brand is now part of US confectionery company Mondelēz International since 2012, after splitting of its previous owner Kraft Foods Inc., which had acquired it as part of its acquisition from Groupe Danone in 2007. The Petit Beurre biscuit remains the flagship product alongside the Ladyfinger, Champagne, Petit four, Prince de LU, Pim's, Paille d'Or, etc.

== History ==
Lefèvre-Utile was founded in Nantes, in 1846 by Jean-Romain Lefèvre. Originally he sold biscuits from the English factory Huntley & Palmers and then he began his own production. The name comes from Lefèvre and his business partner and wife, Pauline-Isabelle Utile. Their initials were first utilized by Alfons Mucha for an 1897 calendar ad for the "Lefèvre-Utile Biscuit Co." That same year the company hired Firmin Bouisset to create a poster ad. Bouisset, already noted for his work for the Menier Chocolate company, created Petit Écolier ("the Little Schoolboy") which incorporated the LU initials. Bouisset's poster was used extensively and the image was embossed on the company's Petit Beurre line of biscuits. Within a few years, the success of the logo resulted in the company becoming known as LU.

The founder's son, Louis Lefèvre-Utile, took over the company and eventually it was acquired by Générale Biscuit S.A., which in turn was acquired by Groupe Danone in 1986. Although an international brand today, LU products are primarily distributed in Western Europe, and in 2005 represented nearly half of the sales for Danone's biscuits and cereal division.

In July 2007, LU was sold to Kraft Foods (now Mondelez International).

In June 2020, during the COVID-19 pandemic, LU released a limited edition of Petit Beurre biscuits with 'merci beaucoup' written on them, as a tribute to healthcare workers.

== Gallery ==
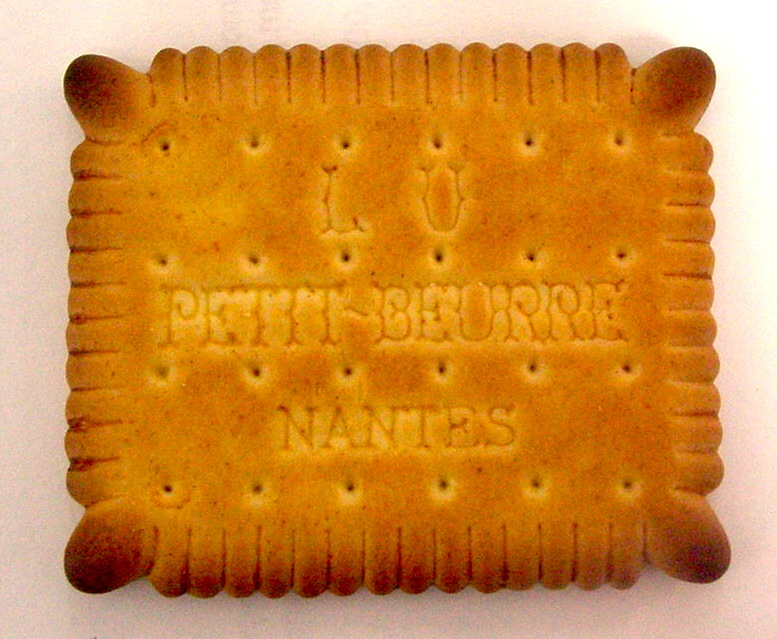
Petit Beurre biscuit, 1886

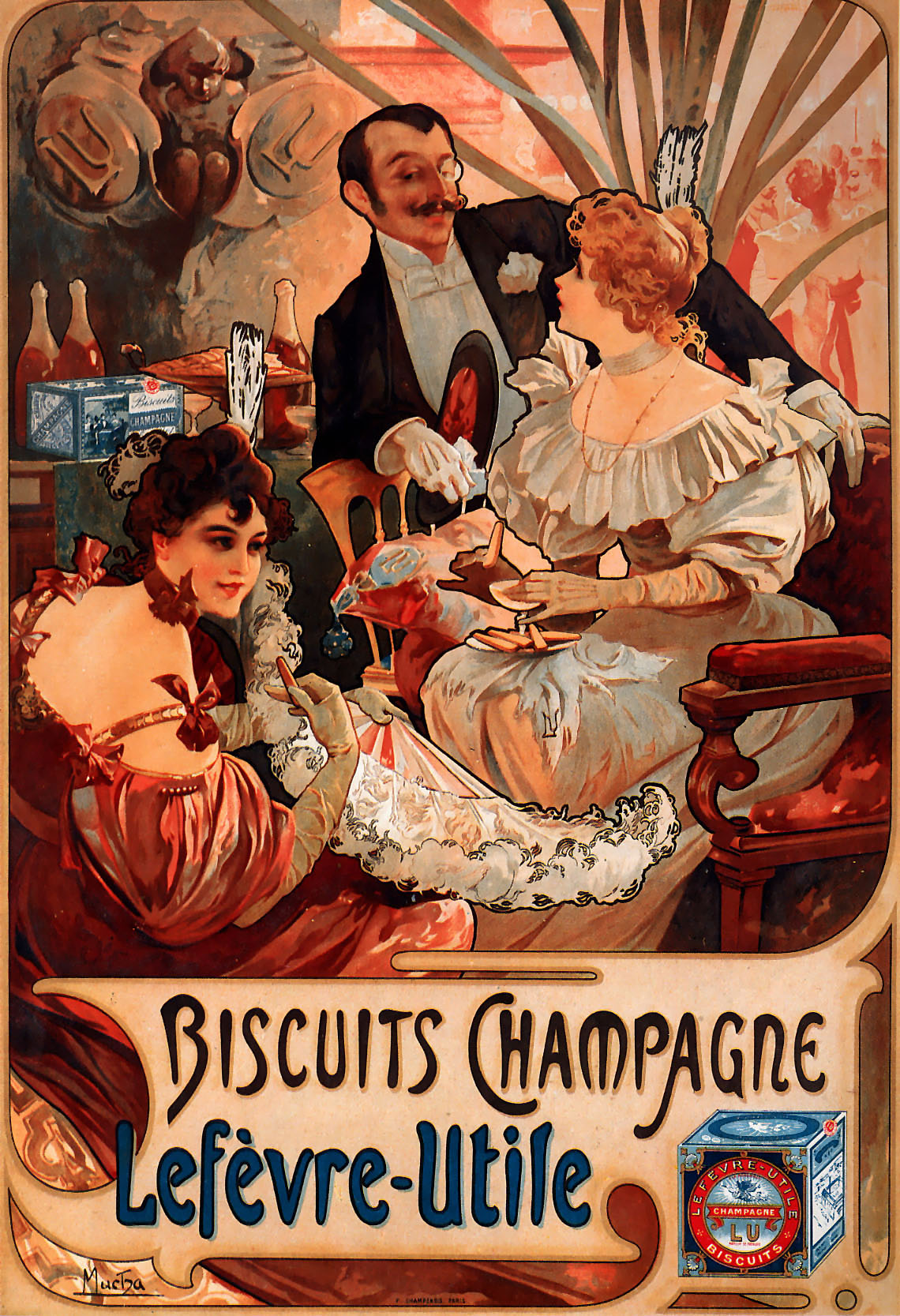
Advertisement for LU Champagne Biscuits, Alfons Mucha, 1896

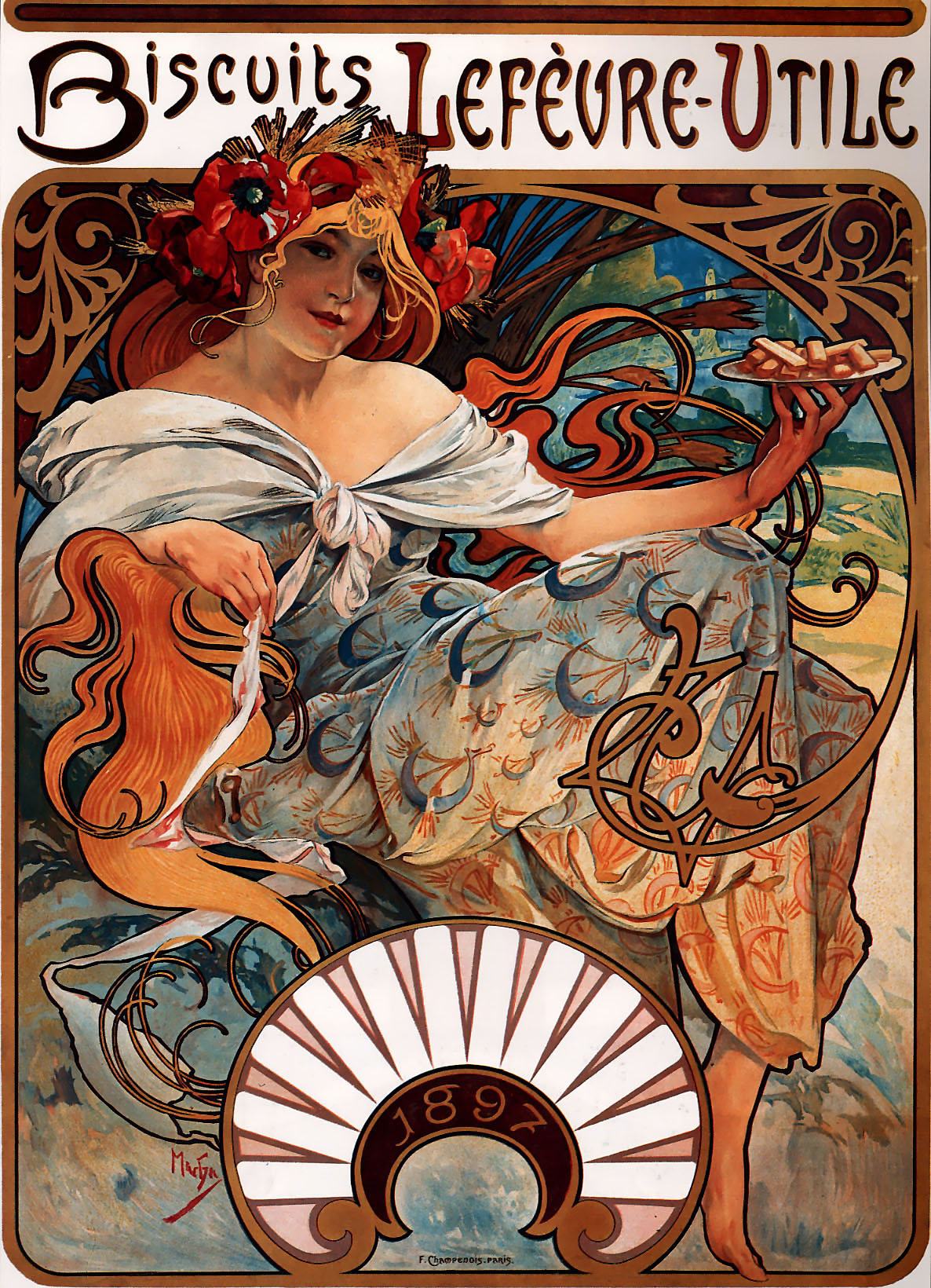
Advertisement for Biscuits Lefèvre-Utile, Alfons Mucha, 1897

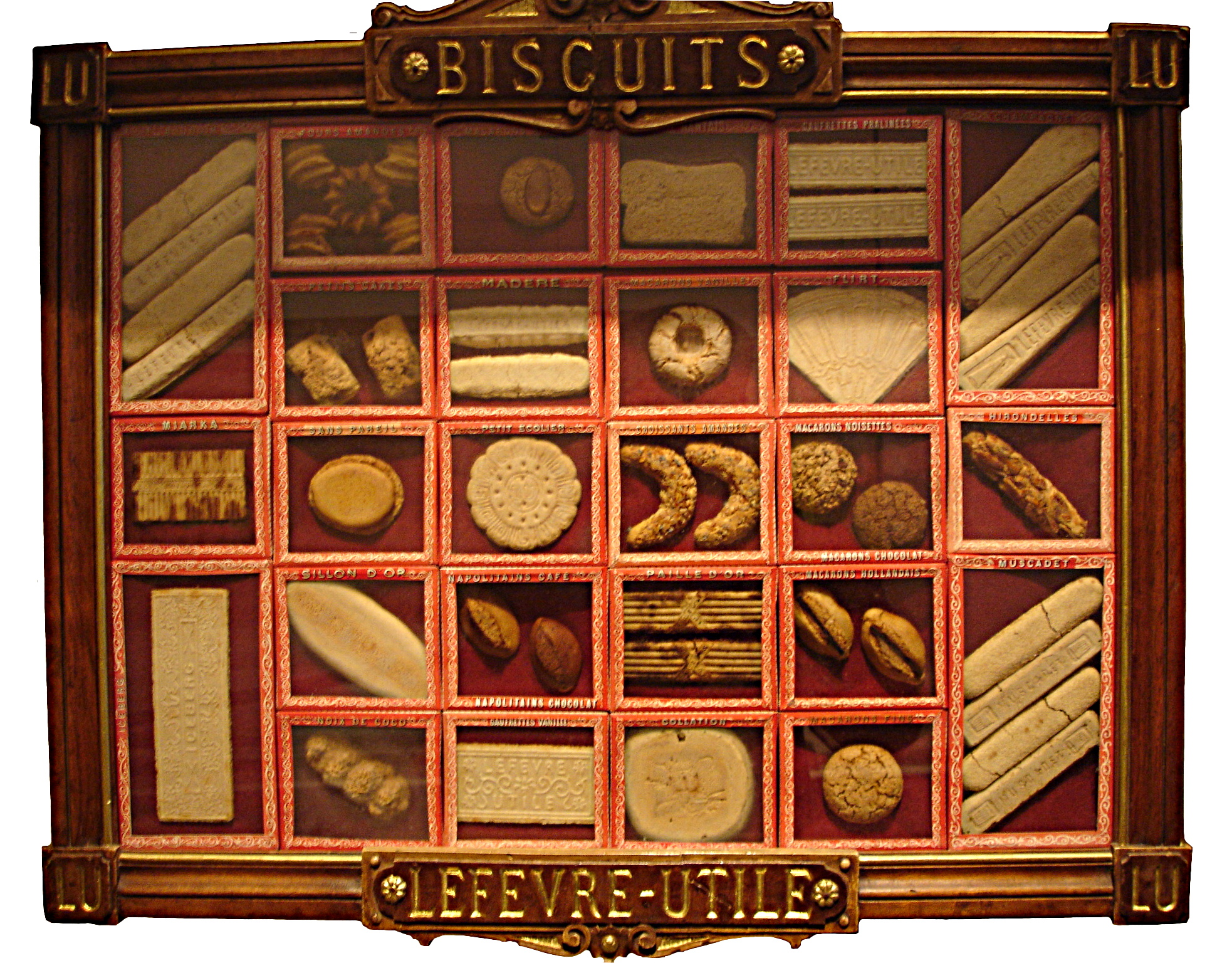
A display of various LU biscuits

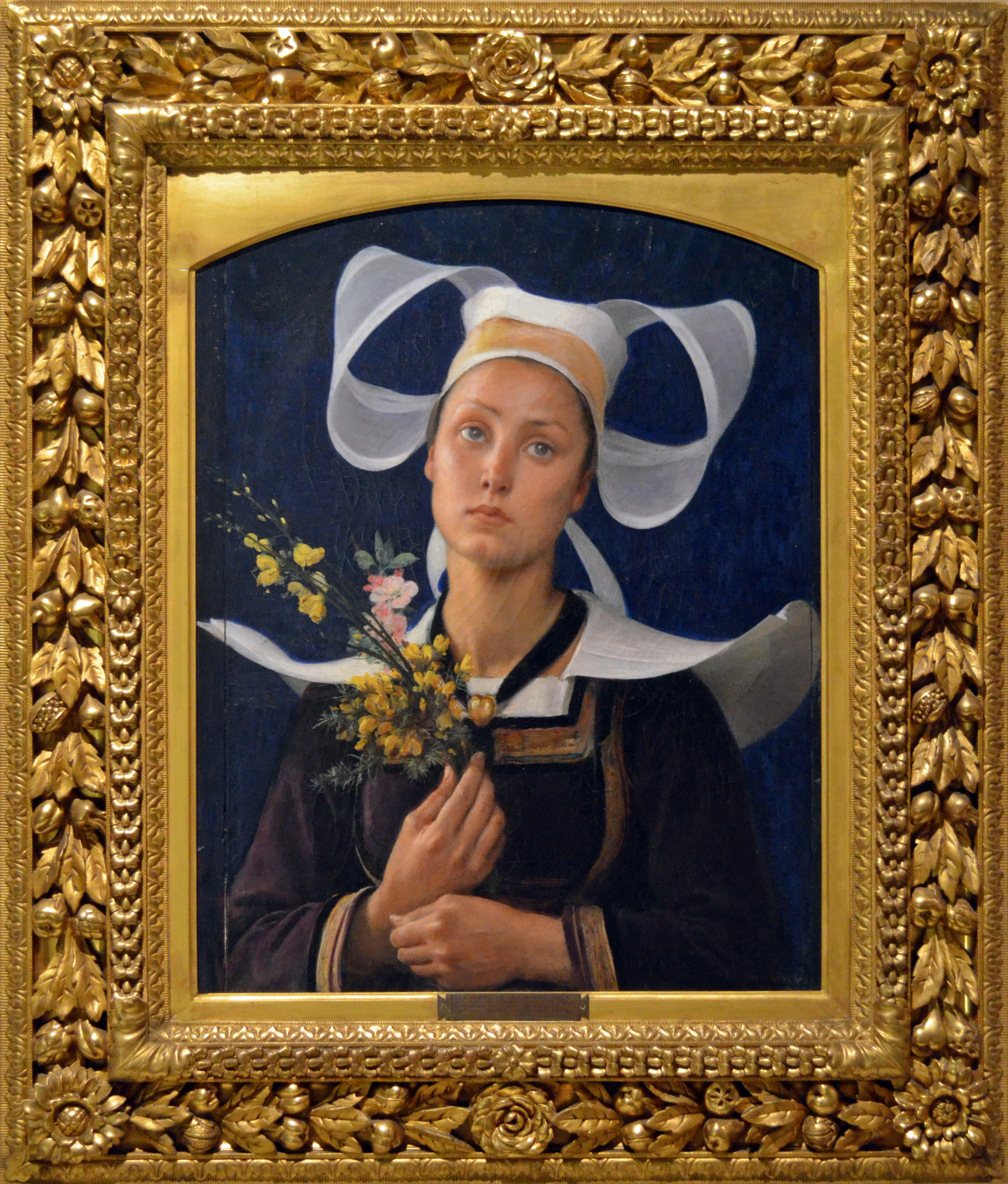
La Bretonne, painted by Hippolyte Berteaux upon request of Lefèvre-Utile

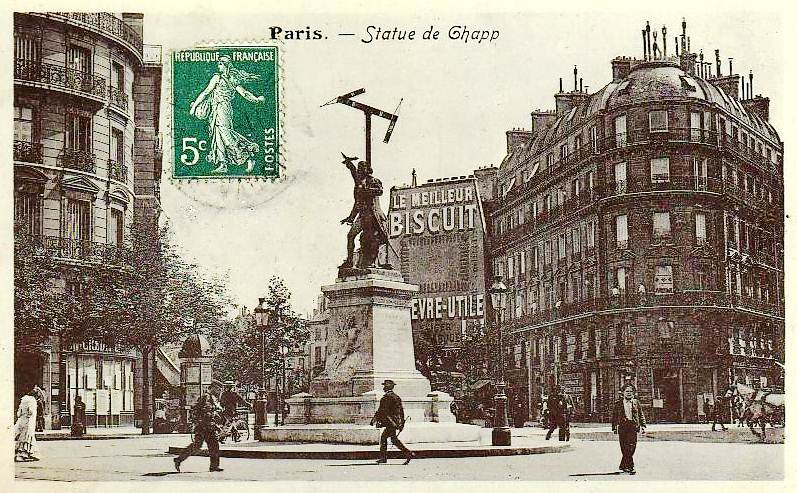
A postcard showing a painted sign for LU biscuits in the background of this Paris street scene with a statue of inventor Claude Chappe, 1908

== See also ==
- Château de Goulaine
- Prince de lu
