= Prince de LU =

American biscuit brand

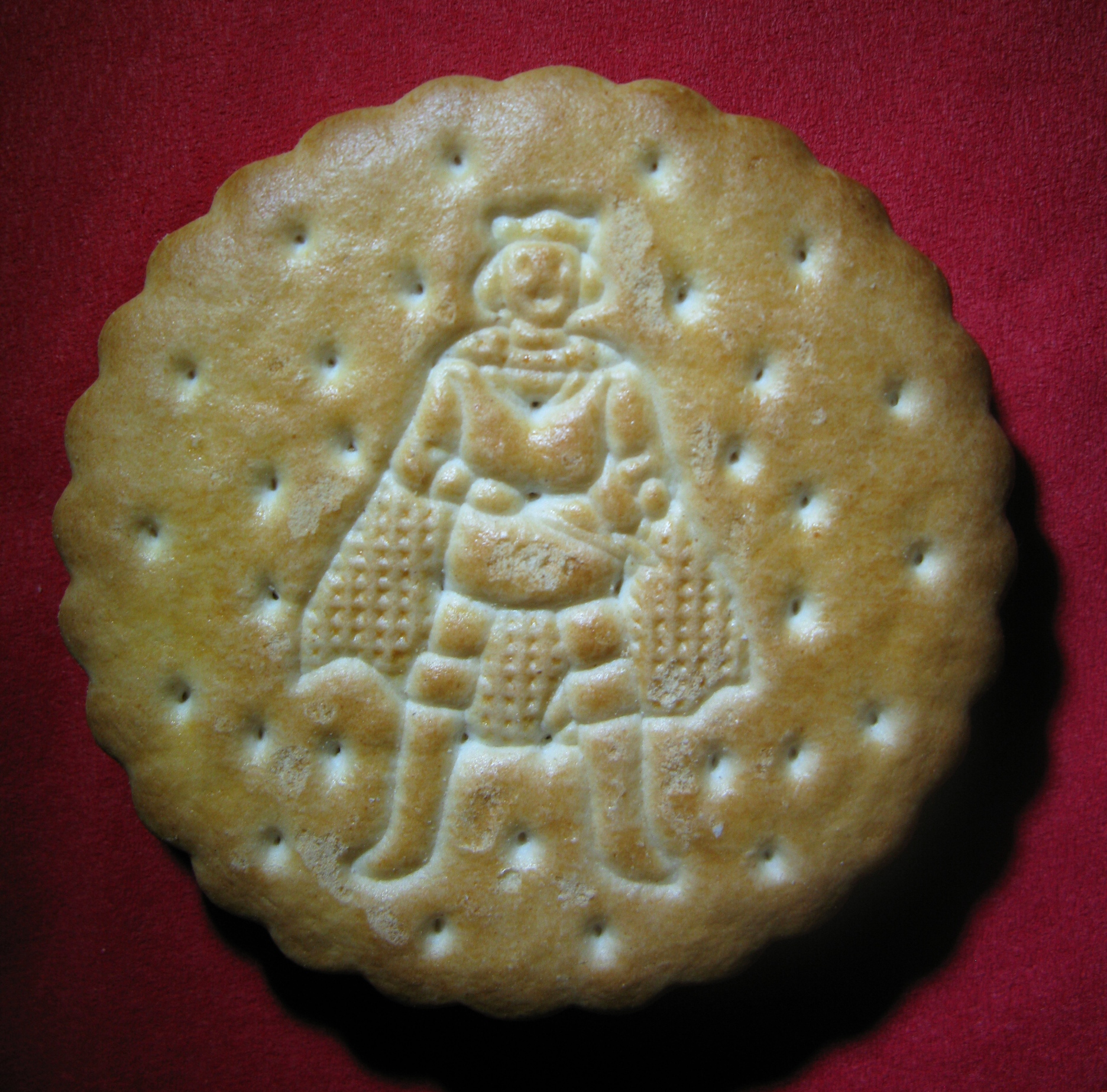

Prince de LU (Prince) is a biscuit brand made by LU of the enterprise Mondelez International.

The title "Prince biscuits" has been given to various foods over time. Today, "Prince biscuits" refers to a sandwich biscuit produced by LU. The cookies feature cocoa or vanilla cream filling sandwiched between two Ritz cracker-like "biscuits" originally designed in 1894 by the Antwerp baker Edward De Beukelaer.

== History ==
"Prince biscuit", or "prince bisket" first appeared in a cookbook in the early 1600s. In 1602, Sir Hugh Platt's "Delightes of Ladies to adorn their Persons, Tables, Closets, and distillatories with Beauties, banquets, perfumes and waters. A first version of the Prince biscuit was designed and sold in Antwerp in 1894 in honor of the Belgian King Leopold II after he visited the pavilion of cookie manufacturer Edward De Beukelaer at the Exposition Internationale d'Anvers (1894). The original design was a dry biscuit with an imprint of the coat of arms of the Kingdom of Belgium.

In 1927, the biscuit was modified to have a cream layer between two circular biscuit layers, this was the start of the production of the "Prince Fourré". An urban legend has it that the Prince Fourré, the double dented shortbread biscuit which contains the chocolate filling, was named after the then 26-year-old heir to the Belgian throne, Prince Leopold, Duke of Brabant, who was fond of chocolate, and that this biscuit allowed him to enjoy the chocolate taste without getting his fingers dirty. However, the name Prince had been coined by De Beukelaer 33 years earlier in honor of Leopold II, the Prince's great uncle.

De Beukelaer moved the production site from the center of Antwerp to a new building in Herentals in 1960. In 1965, it merged with the cookie manufacturer Parein, also from Antwerp, and the two went on together as the company General Biscuits. In 1980, General Biscuits was in turn taken over by LU. Soon the classic biscuit was replaced by a golden biscuit in the oven. In the 1990s, new flavors such as vanilla and milk chocolate appeared, as well as other formats.

The Prince brand was then sold to several multinationals, including Danone. In 2007, it became the property of the American company Kraft Foods. Since 2012, following a split of the Kraft Foods group, the Prince de LU brand has been owned by the American company Mondelez International. Prince was the number 1 biscuit brand in France in 2012 according to a marketing survey and was consumed in more than 50% of French households with children in 2013.
