= Petit Luxembourg =

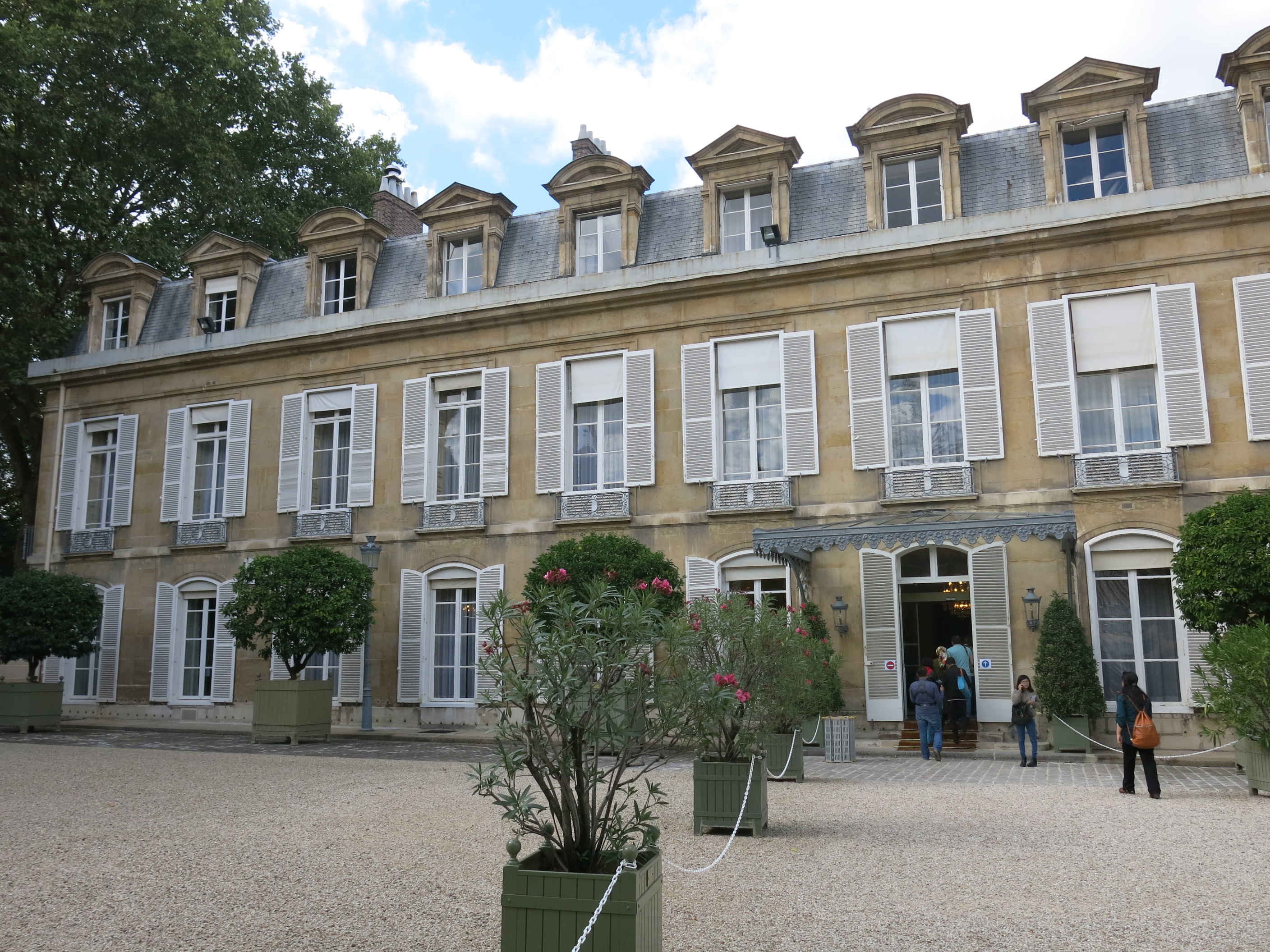
- West wing of the Petit Luxembourg
- Interactive map of the Petit Luxembourg area

General information
- Type: hôtel particulier
- Location: Paris, France, 17–17 bis, rue de Vaugirard
- Current tenants: President of the French Senate
- Construction started: c. 1550
- Renovated: 1710–1713

Design and construction
- Architects: 1550: Unknown; 1710: Germain Boffrand

The Petit Luxembourg (pronounced [pəti lyksɑ̃buʁ]; "Little Luxembourg") is an hôtel particulier and the official residence of the President of the French Senate. It is located at 17–17 bis, Rue de Vaugirard, just west of the Luxembourg Palace, which serves as the seat of the Senate, in the 6th arrondissement of Paris. Originally built around 1550 to the designs of an unknown architect, it is especially noted for the surviving Rococo interiors designed in 1710–1713 by the French architect Germain Boffrand. Further west, at 19 rue de Vaugirard, is the Musée du Luxembourg.

== Early history ==
The original sixteenth-century building is of obscure origin, but became known as the Hôtel de Luxembourg after its acquisition in 1570 by François de Luxembourg, who in 1581 became Duc de Piney, Pair de France. Marie de Médicis purchased the hôtel in 1612 when she began acquiring property for the construction of the adjacent Luxembourg Palace. The old hôtel soon became known as the Petit Luxembourg to distinguish it from the larger building.

Presumed design of the Hôtel de François de Luxembourg
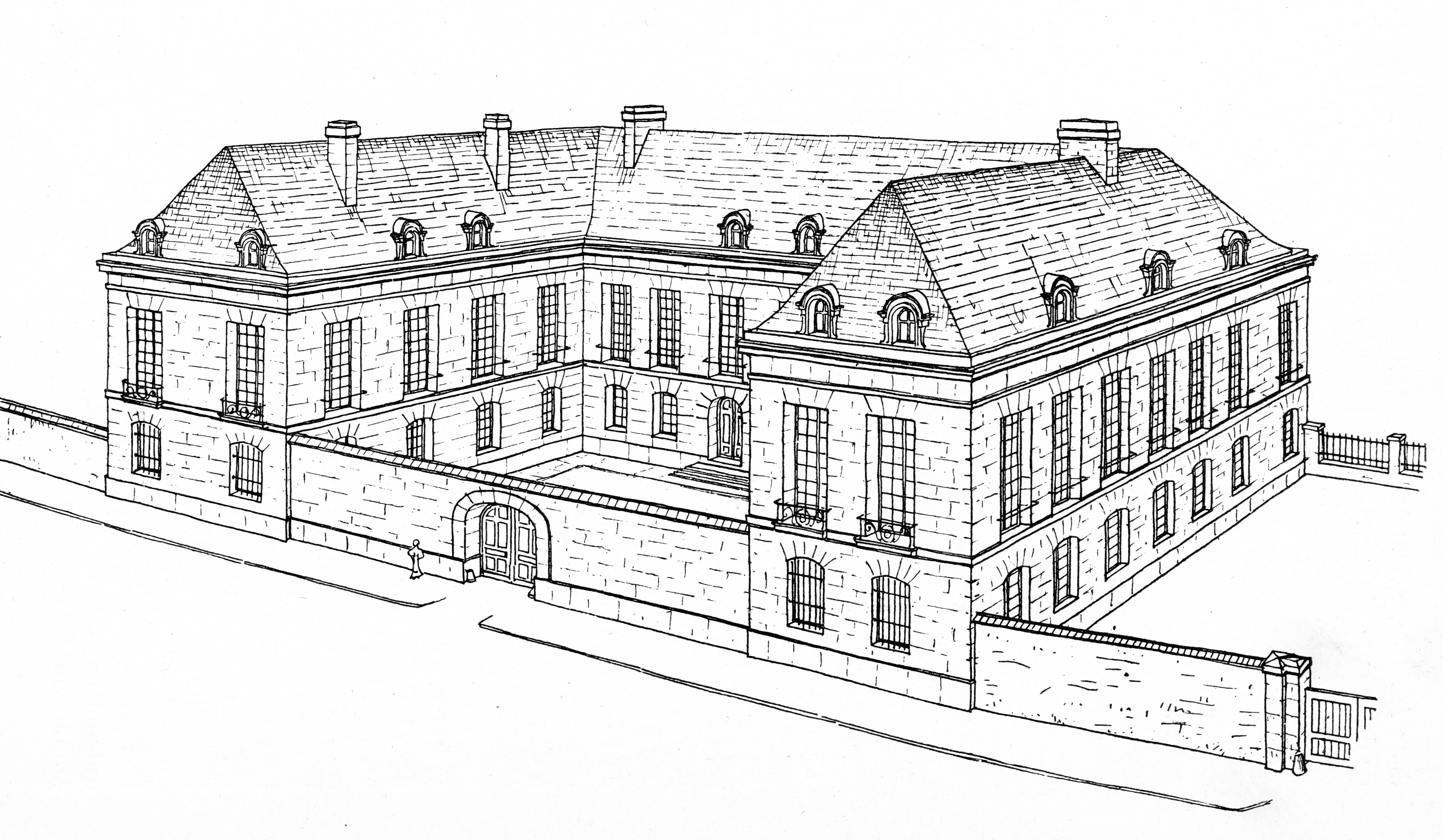
Perspective view

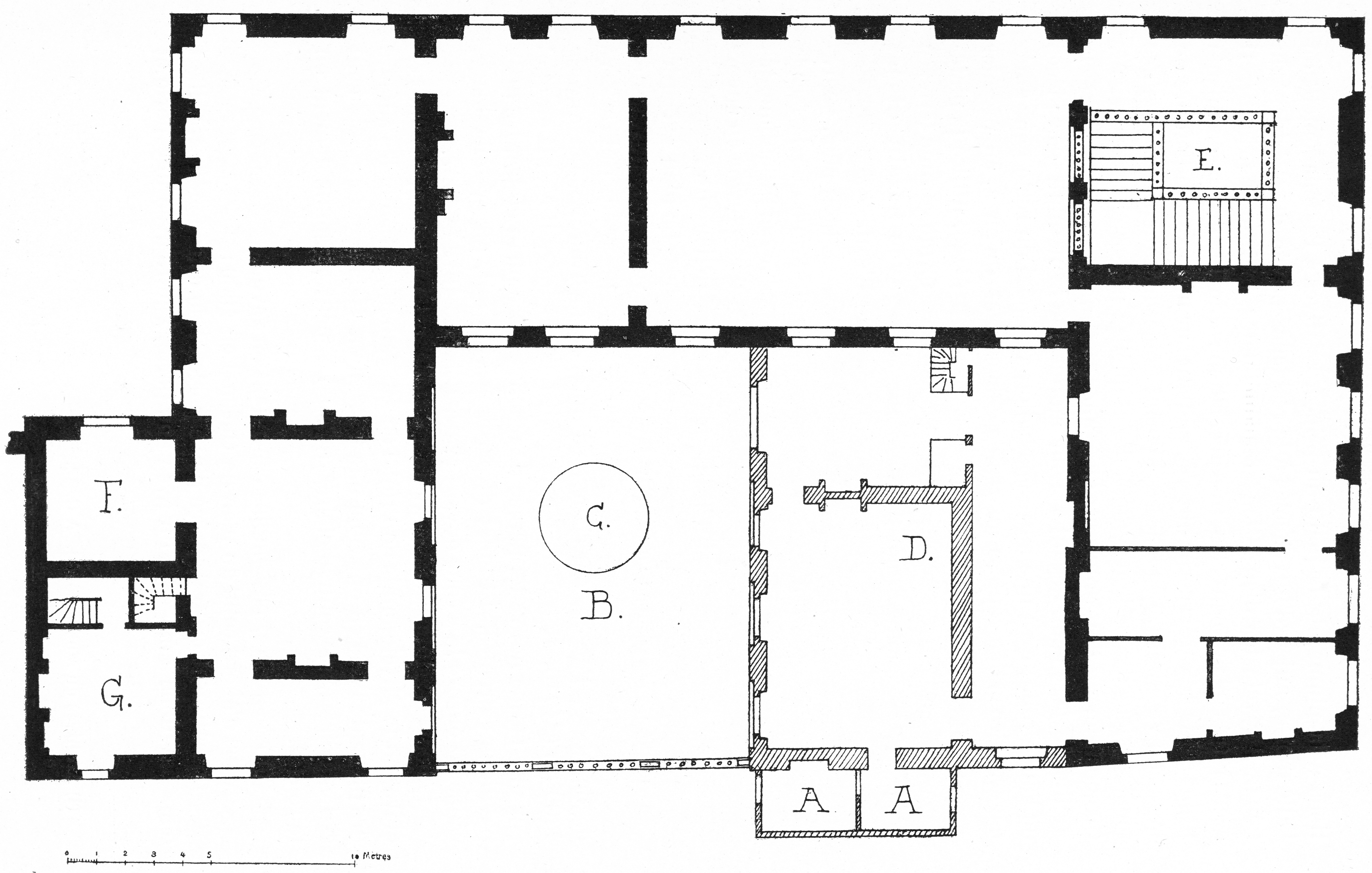
Floor plan with some later modifications made by Marie de Médicis

In 1627 Marie de Médicis gave the Petit Luxembourg to Cardinal de Richelieu, who occupied it while his own grand palace, the Palais-Cardinal, was constructed on the rue Saint-Honoré. Richelieu left the Petit Luxembourg to his niece, the Duchess of Aiguillon. It was inherited in turn by the Grand Condé, who left it to his son, Henri Jules de Bourbon-Condé. The latter's widow, Anne of Bavaria, Princess Palatine, engaged the architect Germain Boffrand to enlarge and redecorate it between 1710 and 1713.

== Boffrand's alterations ==
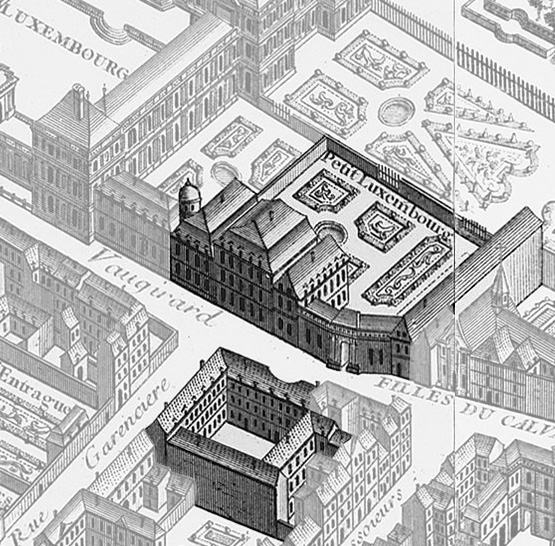
The Petit Luxembourg on the 1739 Turgot map of Paris

Boffrand demolished the service buildings to the west of the courtyard, replacing them with a new wing for the Palatine officers. The new wing preserved the style of the old corps de logis to the east and incorporated vestiges of the Couvent des Filles-du-Calvaire, founded by Marie de Médicis in 1622. These can still be seen in the winter garden and the Mannerist interior of the Queen's Chapel. Between the street and the courtyard Boffrand added an entrance screen which connected the old to the new. Its portal is flanked by Tuscan columns on the concave courtyard side and Ionic on the convex street side. The upper floor contains a corridor connecting the east and west wings.

Although Boffrand preserved the façades of the older wing, he completely redesigned the interior. A modest vestibule with Ionic columns leads directly to a grand two-storey stair hall decorated on the upper floor with pilasters of the Composite order, elaborate carvings, and a coffered vault. The staircase, much admired in its day, sweeps up to the piano nobile in a single flight, its grandeur enhanced with balustrades of stone, rather than the more usual wrought iron. The princess's apartments lead directly off the landing. The first room no longer has the original décor, but the next (the Salon des Tapisseries) still has Boffrand's ceiling, cornices, and frieze. The following room, the Grand Salon also retains these elements.

In large rooms, such as the stair hall and the Grand Salon, Boffrand's unit of design was not the wall (as seen with Pierre Lepautre), but rather the entire room. Each wall consisted of a great arcade, which "pulled the space together and subordinated doors, windows, and mirrors to a regular rhythm." The focus of the décor was high in the spandrels between the arches, not in the wall panels as seen with Lepautre. This principle, first employed by J. H. Mansart at the Grand Trianon, kept the main part of the wall surface free for hangings, such as tapestries and paintings. The band of ornate spandrels running around the room achieves a unity, which is further emphasized by the slightly vaulted ceiling. Boffrand's decorative motifs, "the linked C-scrolls entwined with palmettes and festoons," are more similar to those of Jean Bérain than Lepautre.

Boffrand also added another hôtel for the household, with kitchens and stables, on the other side of rue de Vaugirard; an underground passage linked the two residences.

Boffrand's designs for the Petit Luxembourg
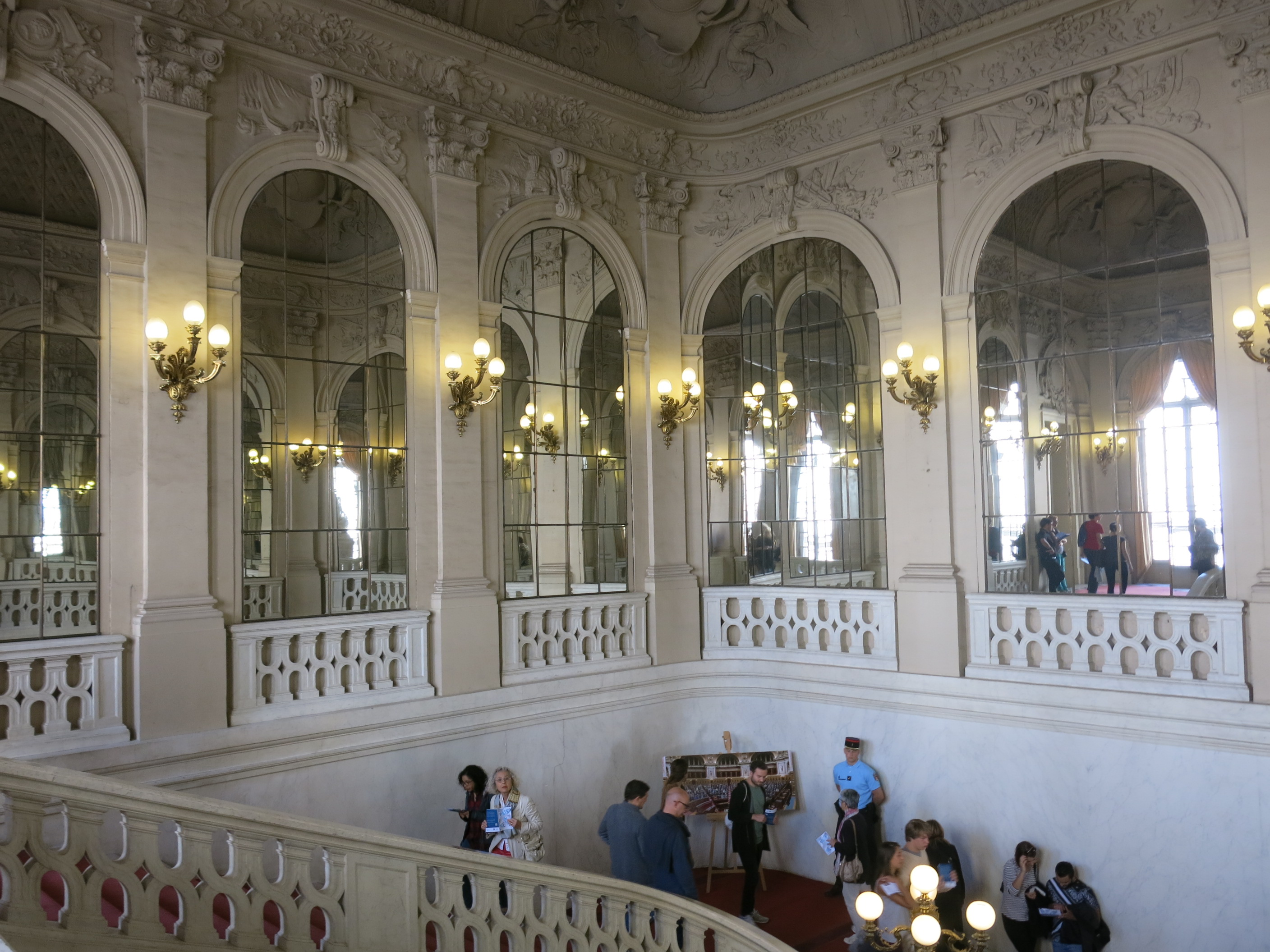
Boffrand's staircase

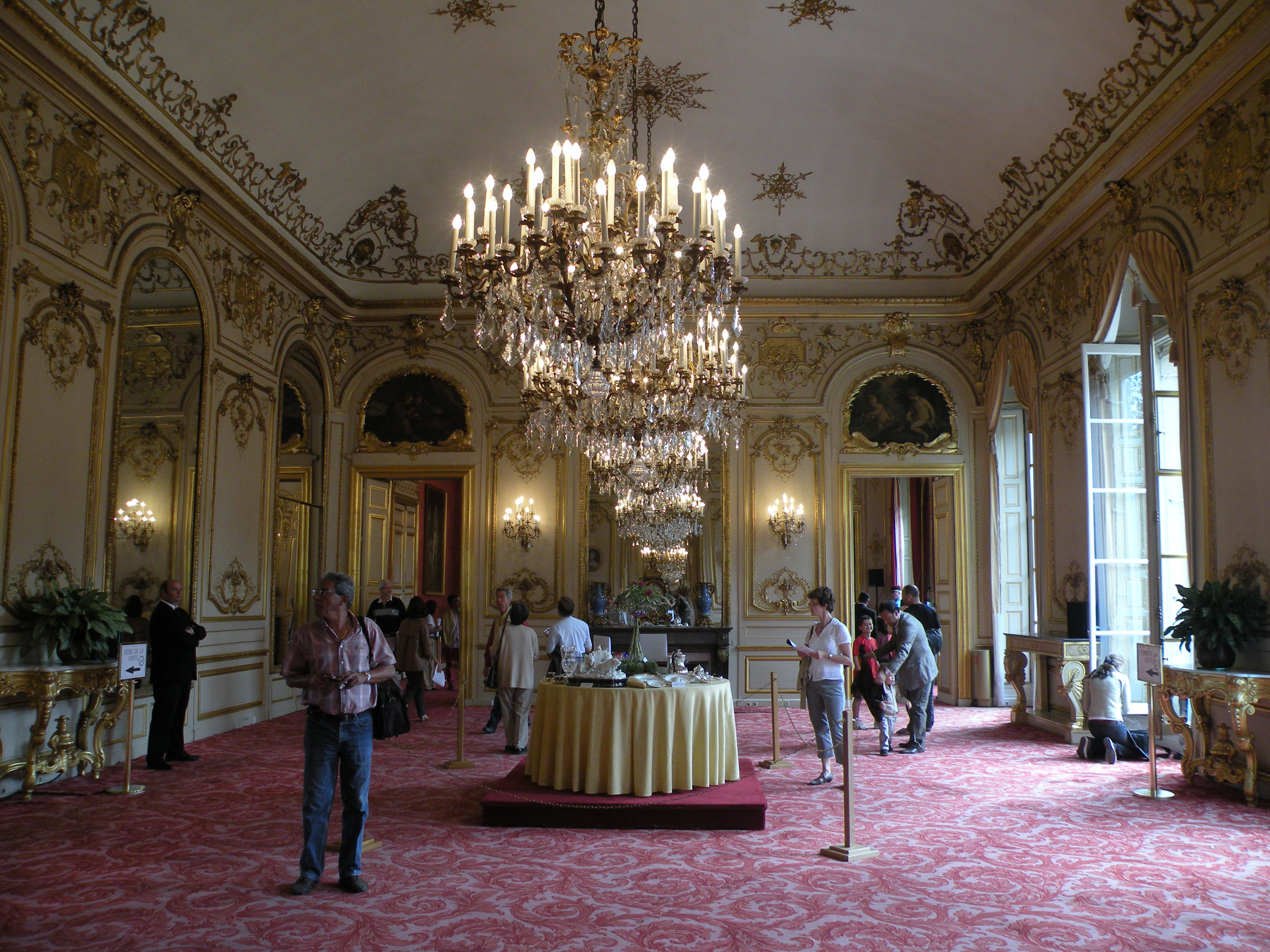
Grand Salon
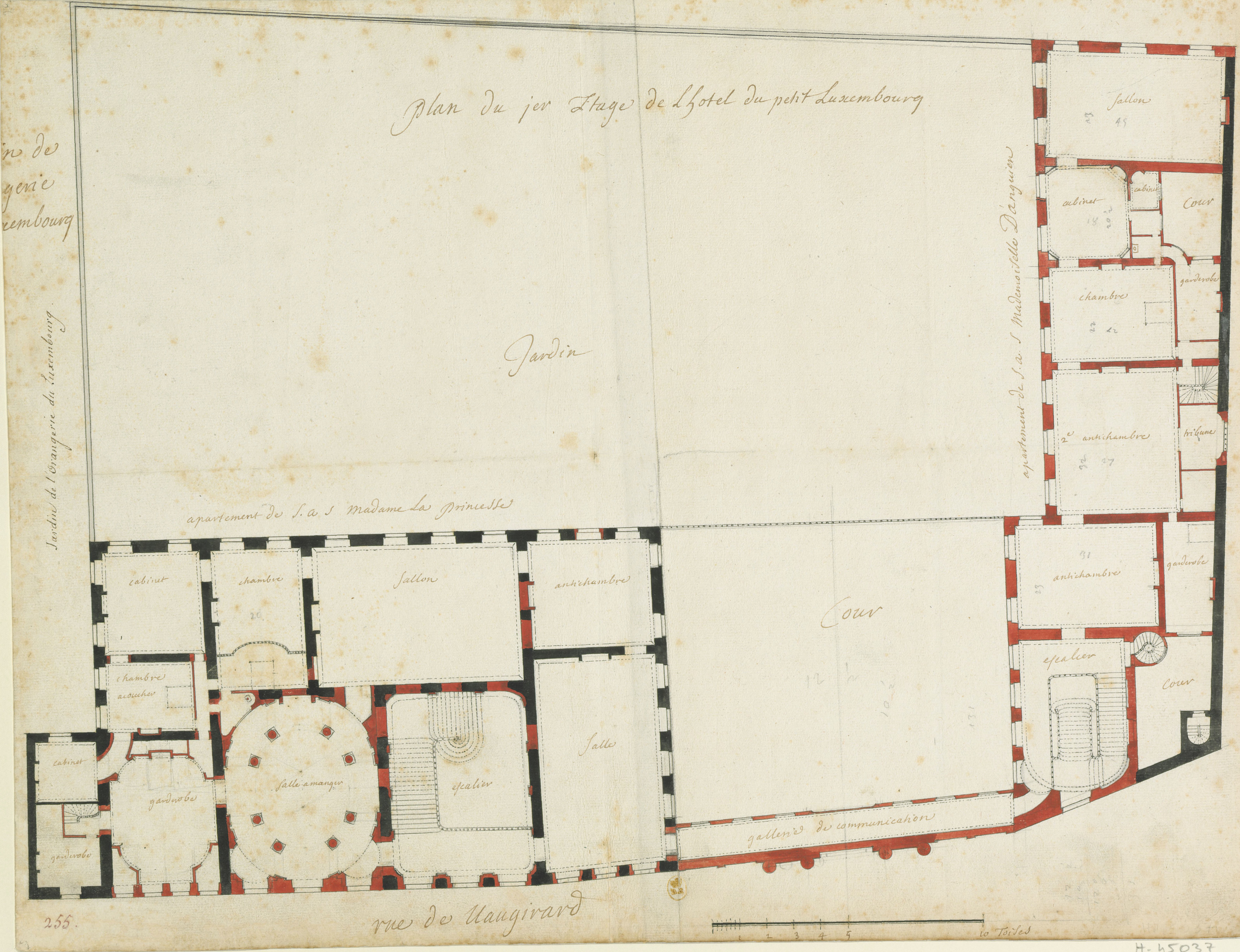
Project of 1709, first-floor plans for the main buildings (south at the top)

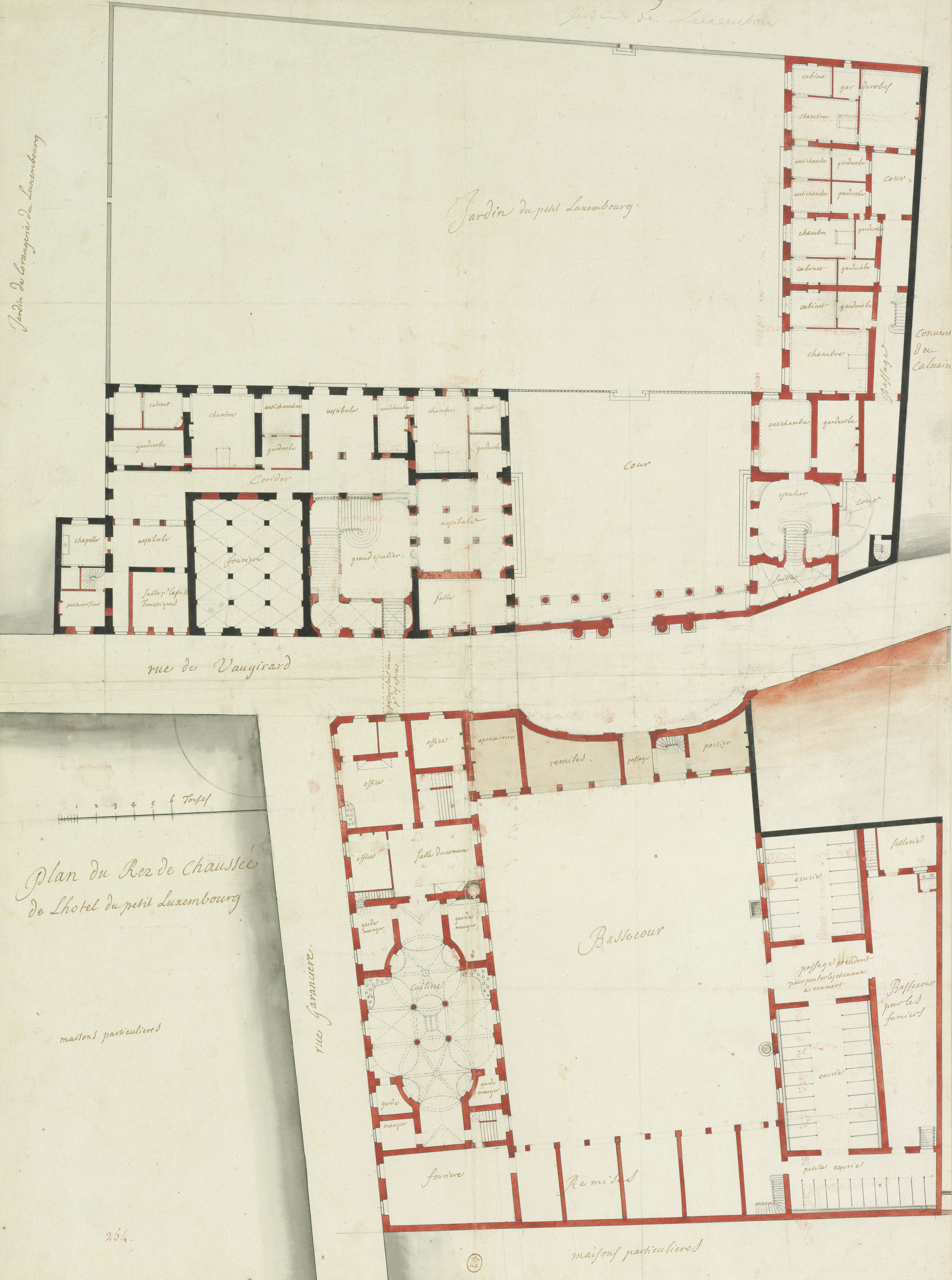
Project of 1709, ground-floor plans for the main buildings and the service wing north of the rue de Vaugirard

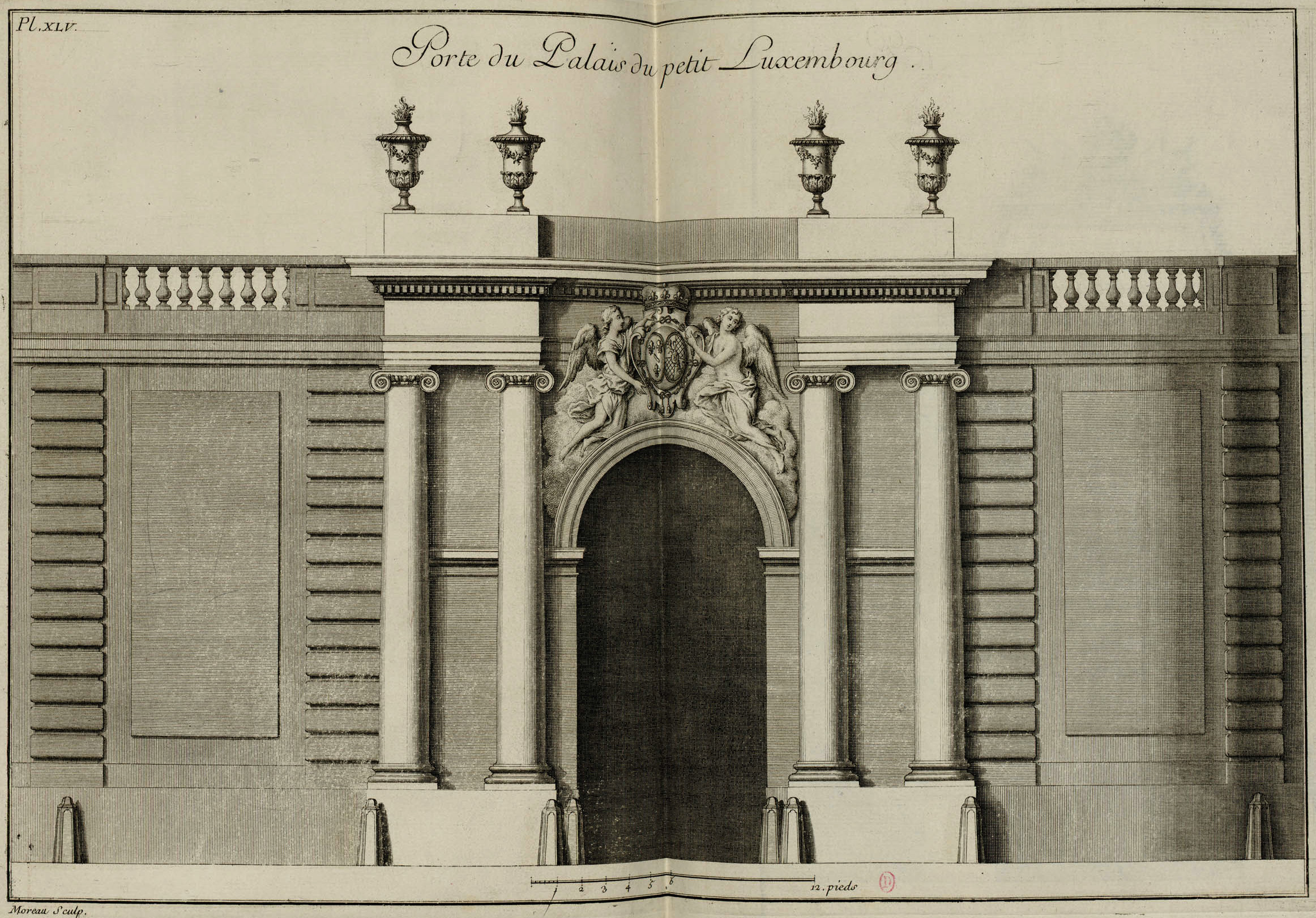
Coach entrance on the rue de Vaugirard from Boffrand's Livre d'architecture, 1745

== Later history ==
During the French Revolution, from 6 October 1789 until their departure into exile on 20 June 1791, the Petit Luxembourg was the assigned residence of the Count of Provence (the future Louis XVIII) and his wife.

After Napoleon's coup of 18 Brumaire (on 9 November 1799), he became First Consul on 11 November, and he and his wife Joséphine moved from the Hôtel de la Victoire into the west wing of the Petit Luxembourg, evicting the directors he had just brought down. Napoleon took the former apartment of Louis Gohier on the ground floor, and Joséphine, the former apartment of Jean-François Moulin on the floor above. They used the east wing for official functions. Finding their living quarters at the Petit Luxembourg "too cramped", they moved to the Tuileries after three months. Under Napoleon, the Conseil d'État (Council of State) was seated at the Petit Luxembourg from 25 December 1799.

Since 1958, the Petit Luxembourg has been the official residence of the president of the French Senate.

== Images of the Petit Luxembourg ==
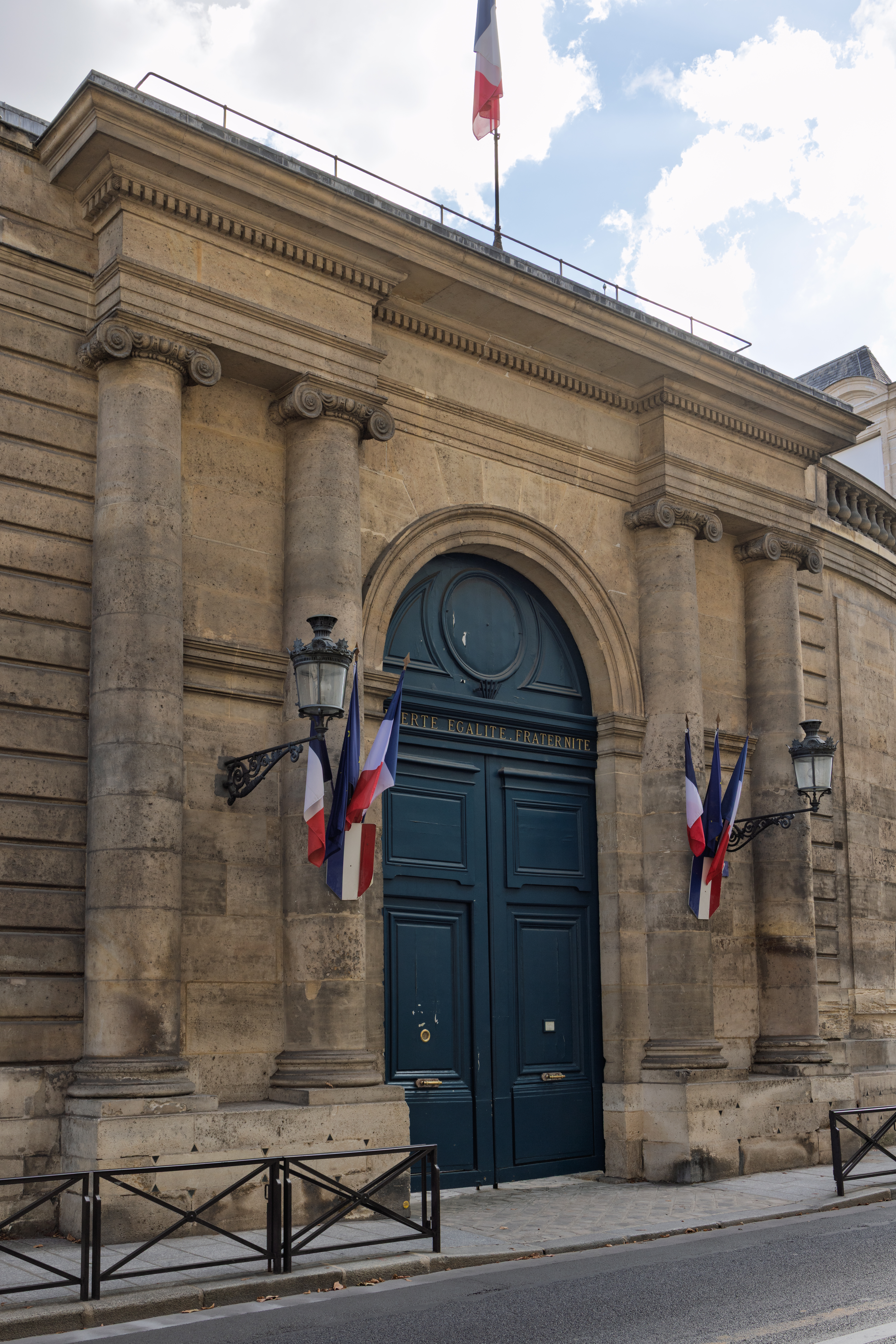
Entrance on rue de Vaugirard

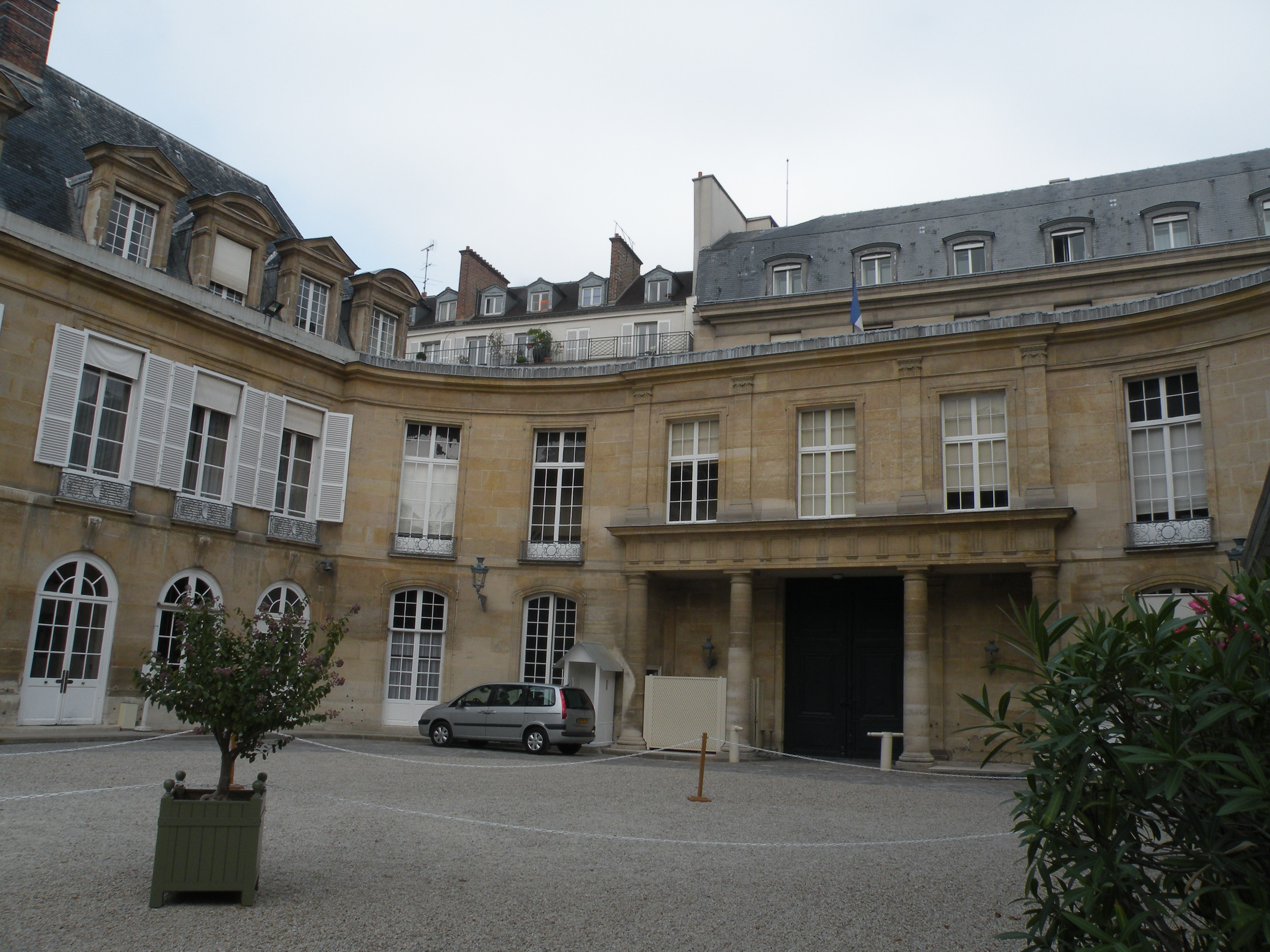
Courtyard side of the entrance

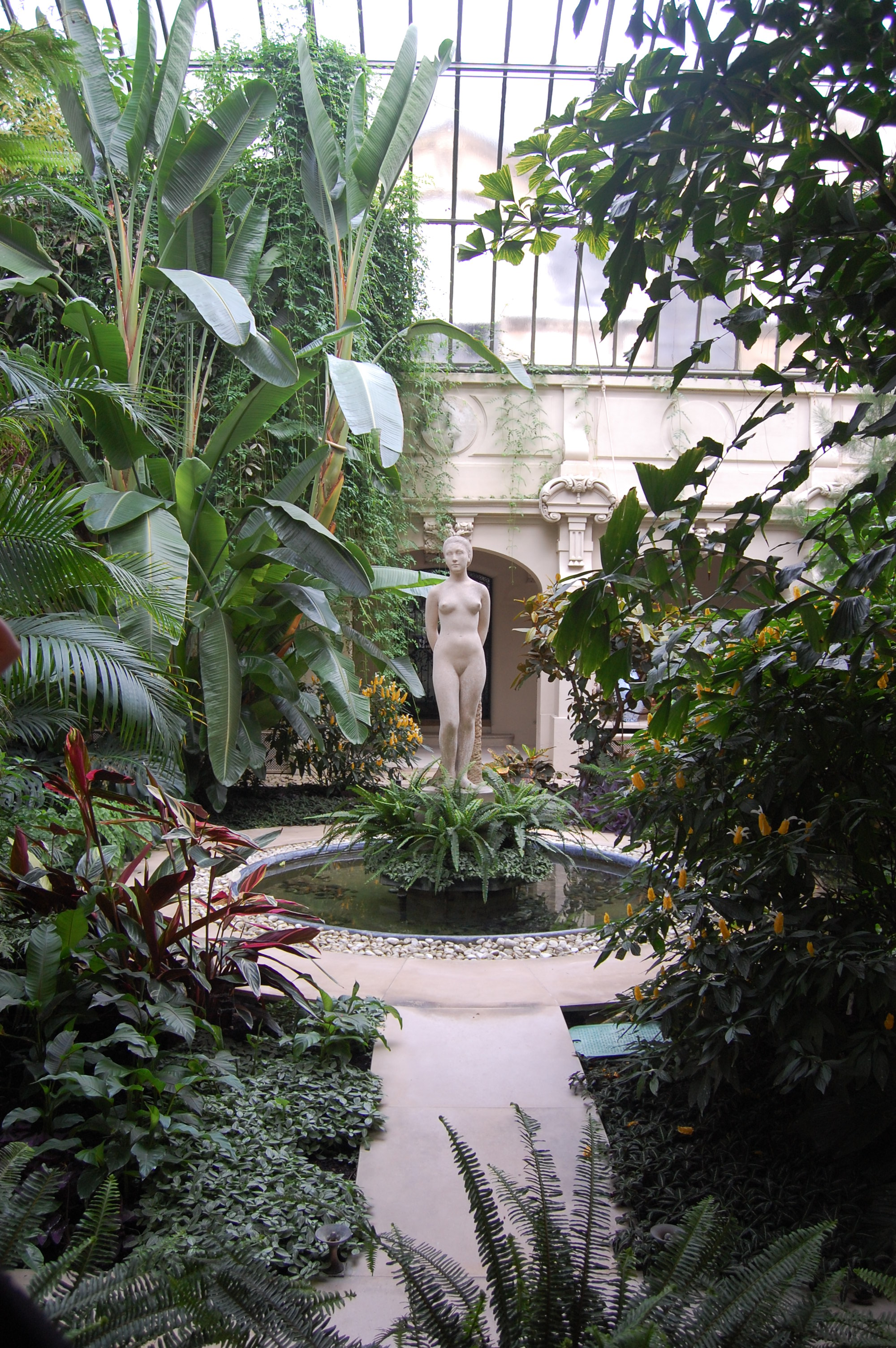
Winter garden

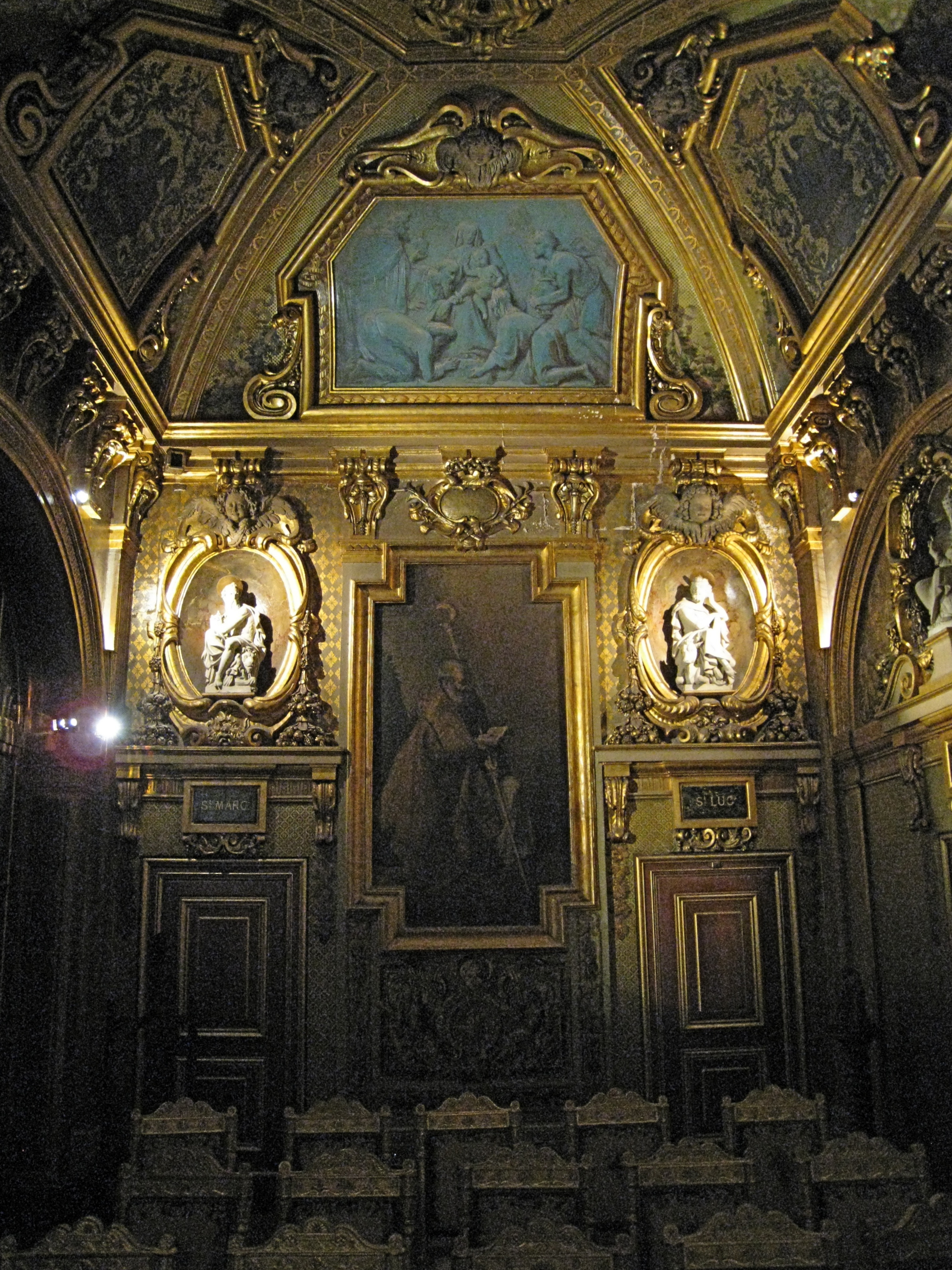
Chapel (1622–1631)

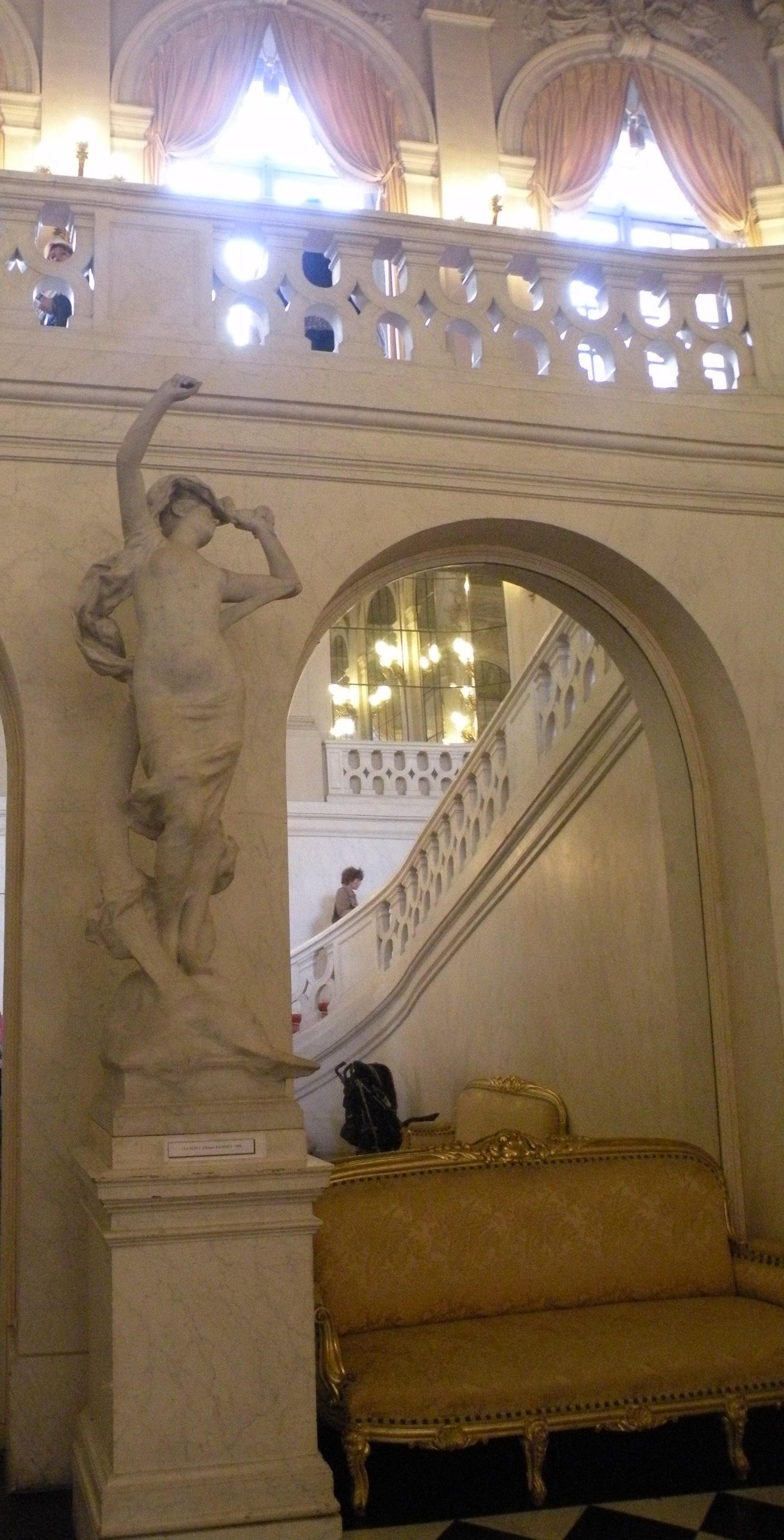
Grand staircase, reflected in a mirror

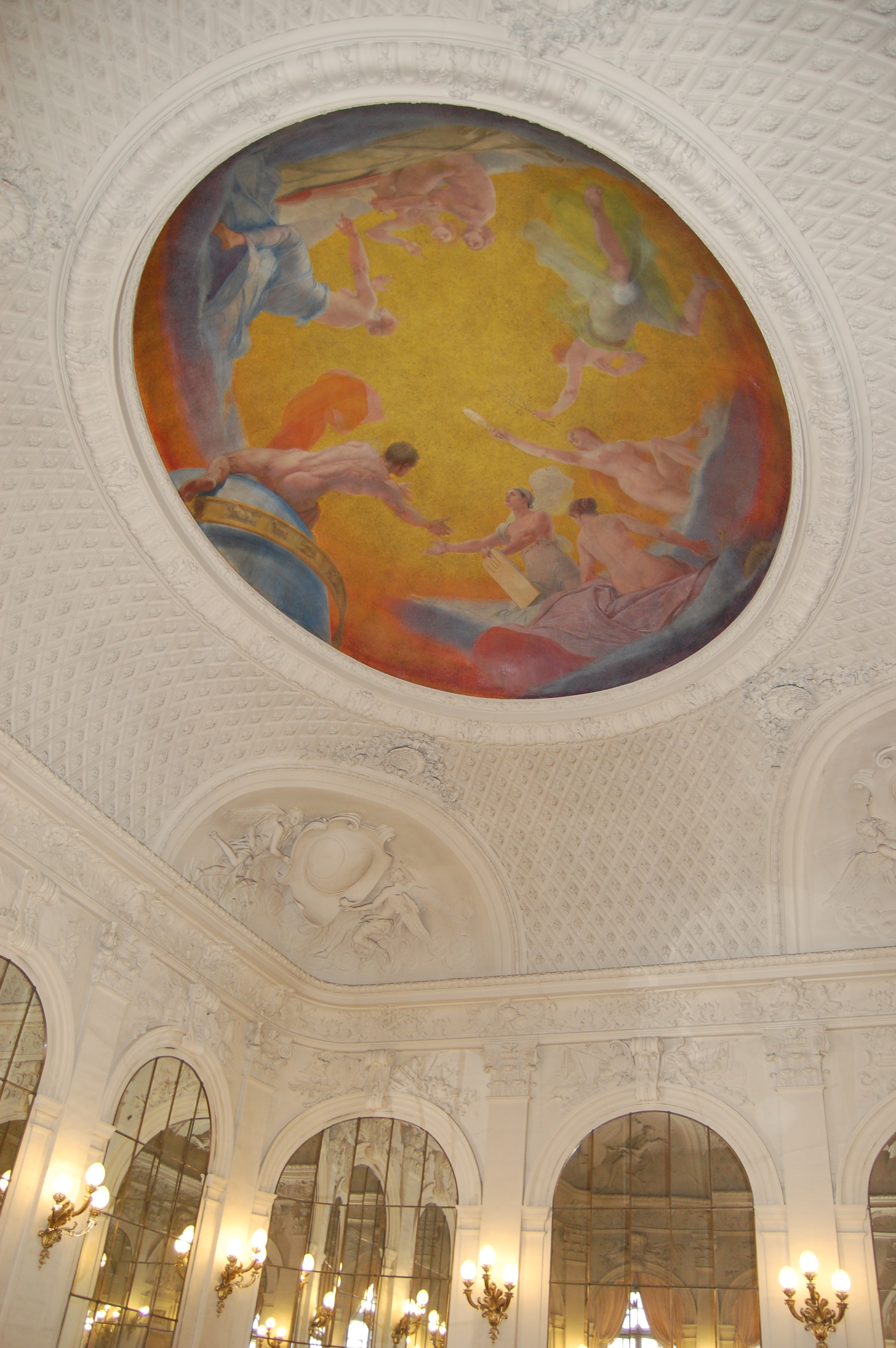
Stair hall ceiling with 1894 painting by Hippolyte Berteaux

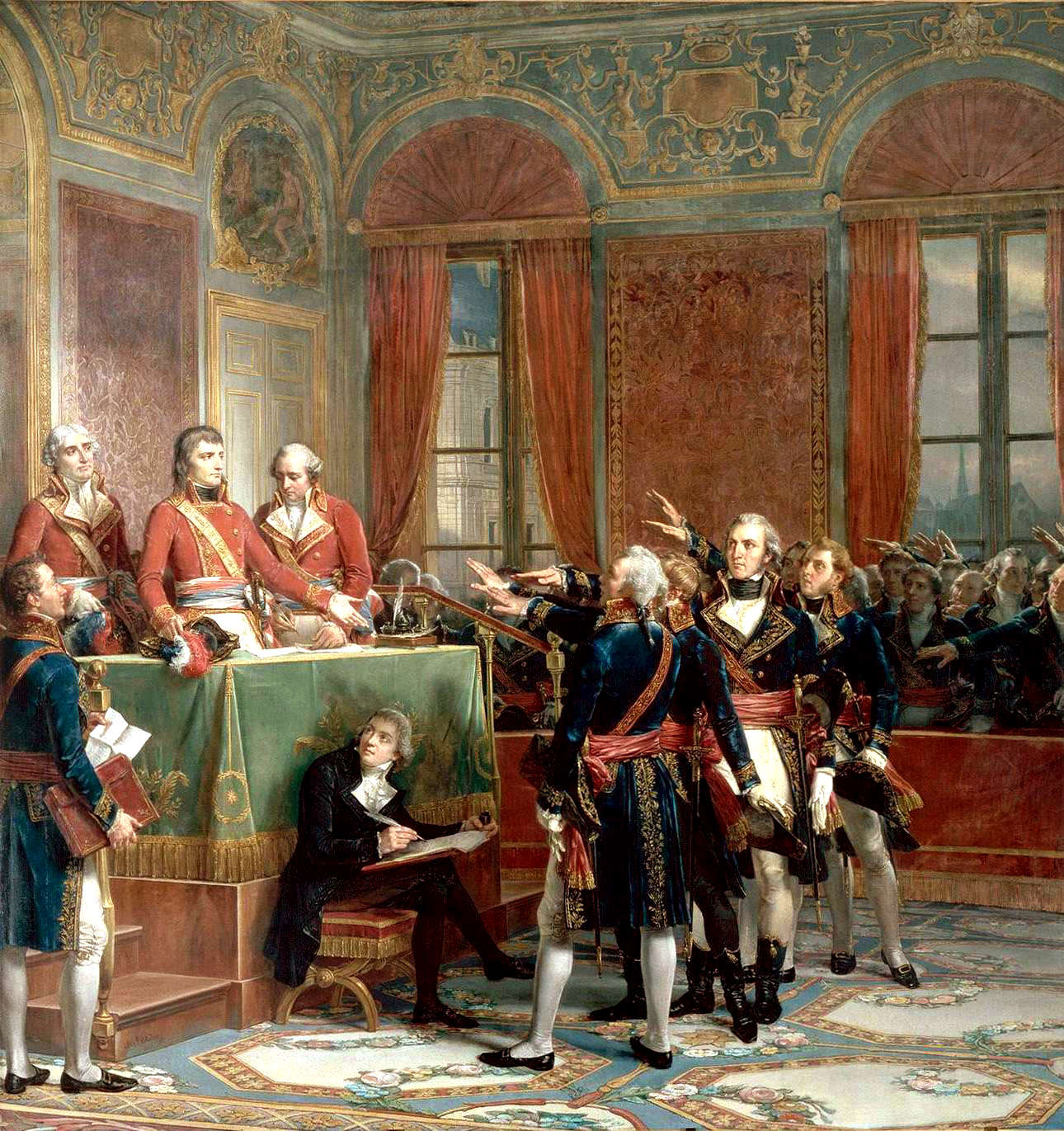
Installation of the Conseil d'Etat at the Petit Luxembourg, 25 December 1799, by Couder, 1856

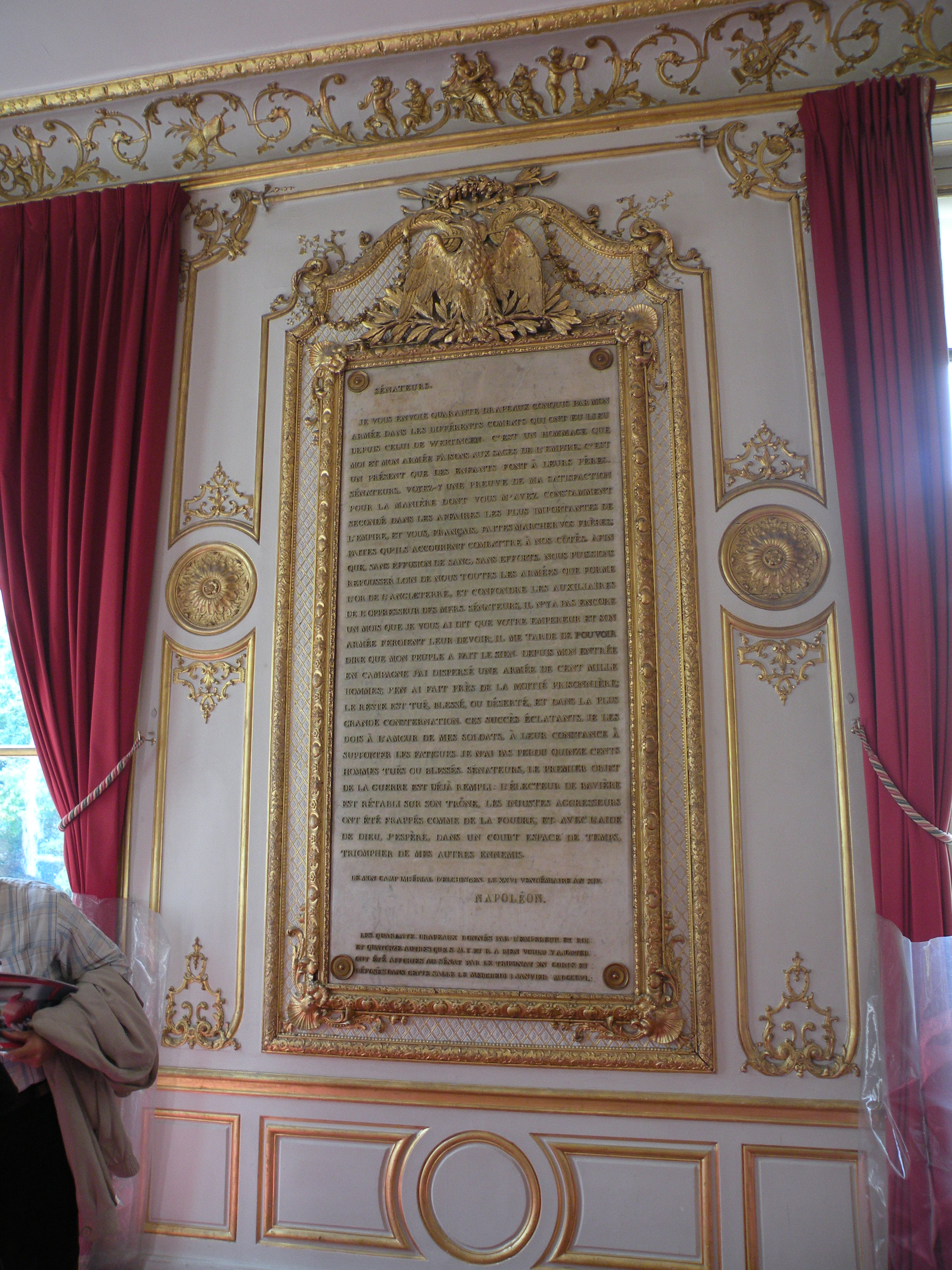
Napoleonic marble plaque inserted in 18th-century boiserie

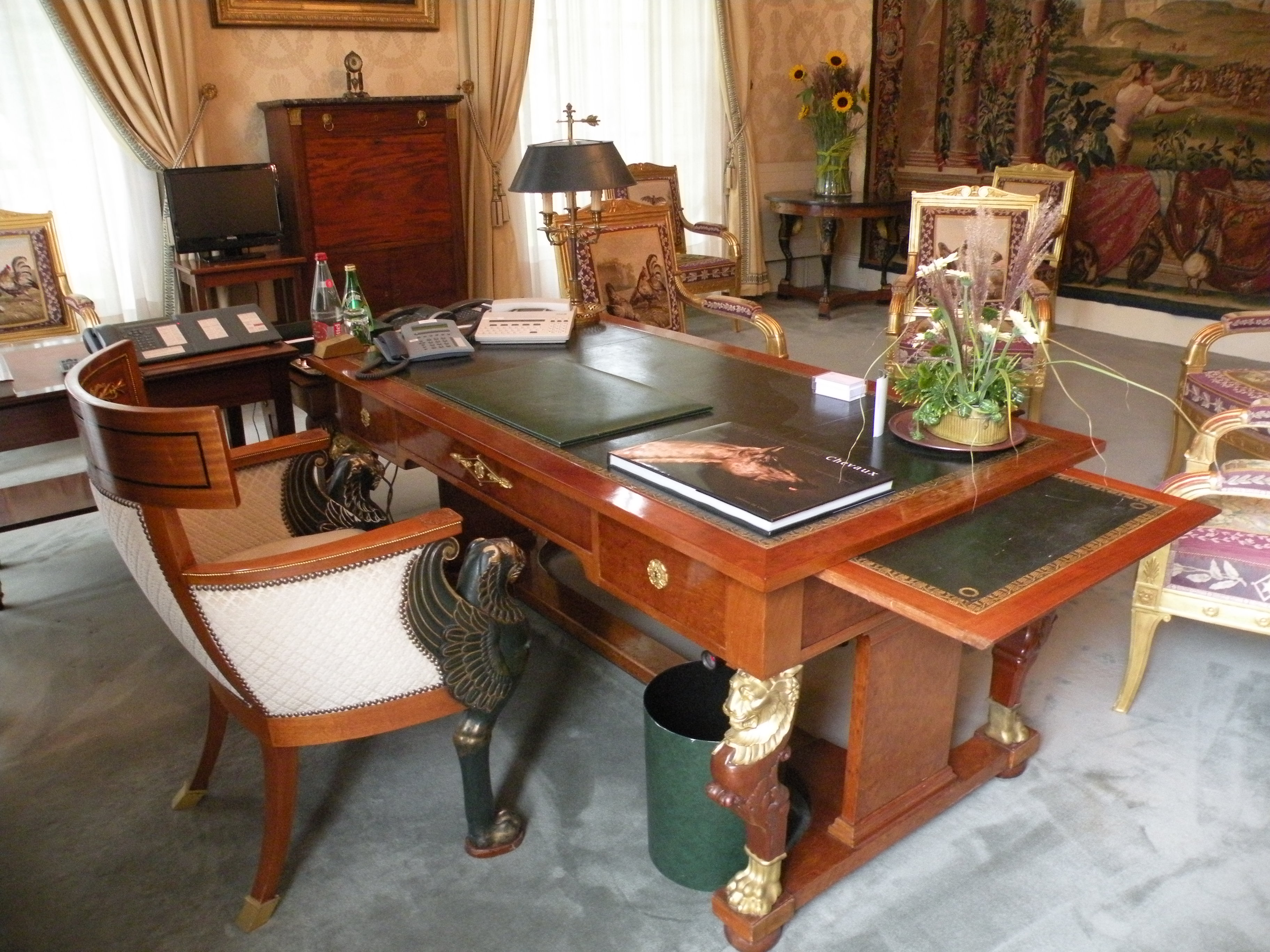
Office of the Senate President

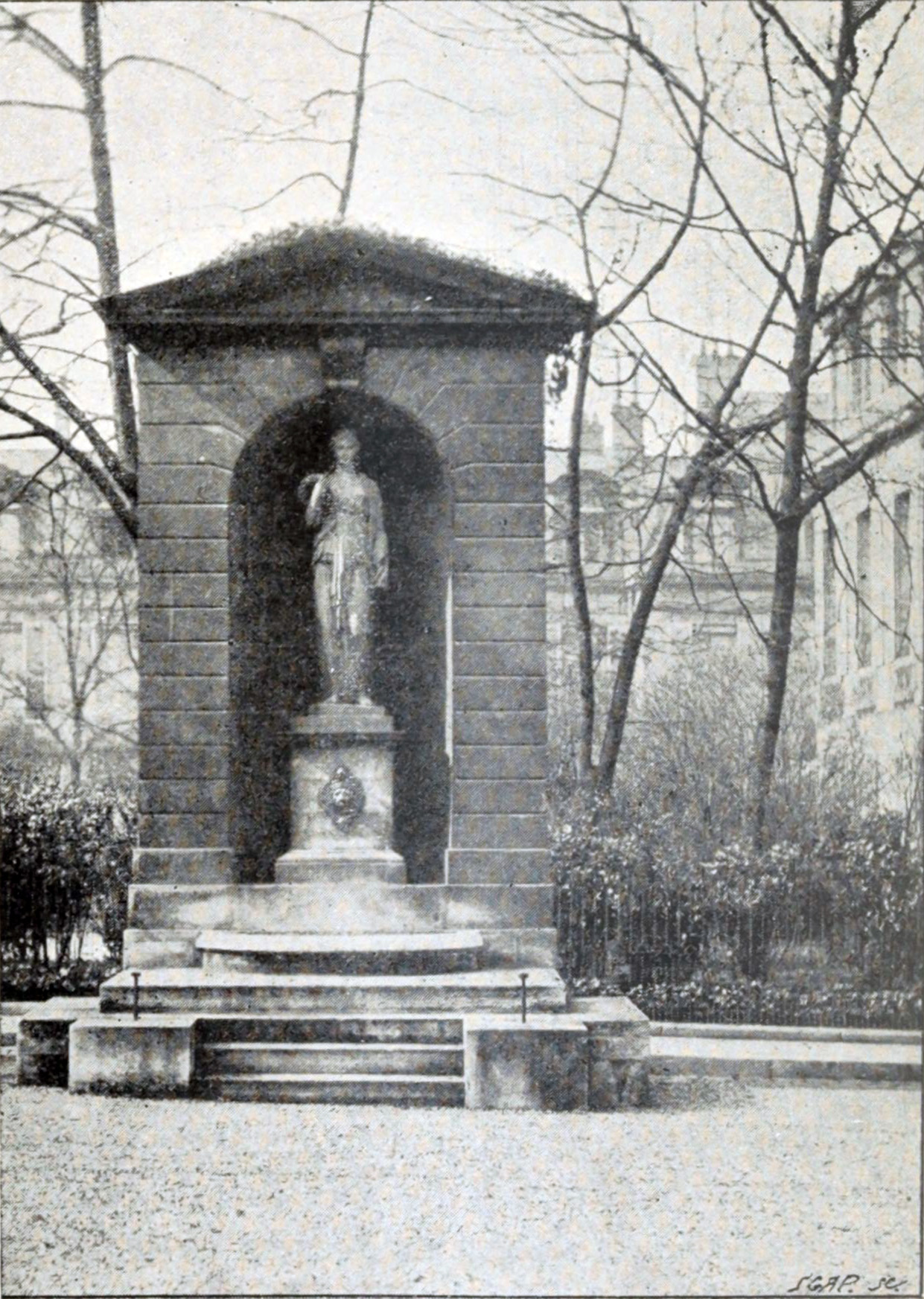
Garden fountain, 1905

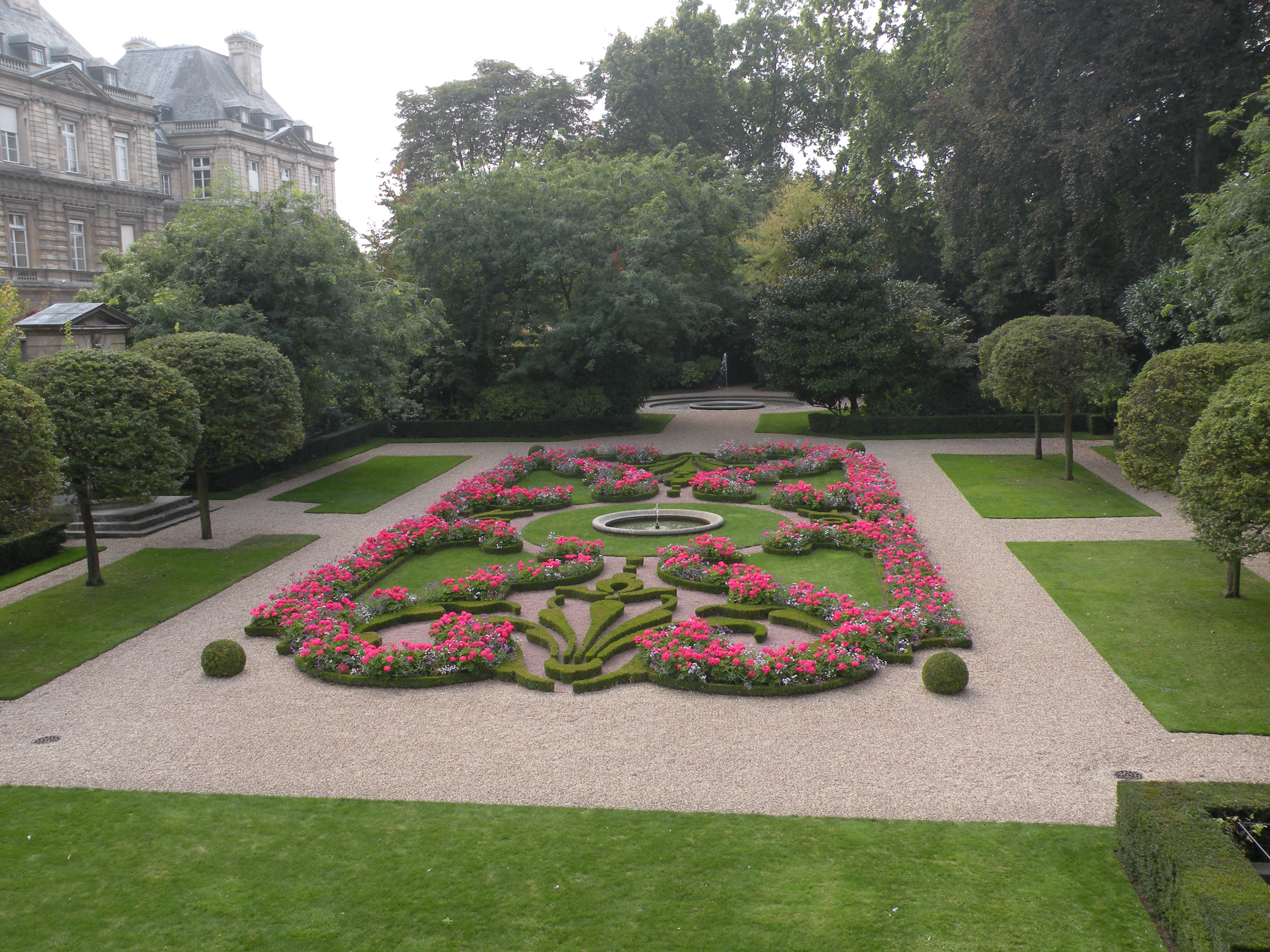
Garden

== Bibliography ==
- Ayers, Andrew (2004). The Architecture of Paris. Stuttgart; London: Edition Axel Menges. ISBN 9783930698967.
- Boffrand, Germain (1745). Livre d'architecture. Paris. Copy at INHA
- Chevallier, Bernard (2004). Napoléon, les lieux du pouvoir. Paris: Artlys. ISBN 9782854952162.
- Hustin, Arthur (1910). Le Luxembourg, son histoire domaniale, architecturale, décorative et anecdotique. Des premiers siècles à l'année 1611. Paris: Imprimérie du Sénat. OCLC 888816591, 563876634. Copy at HathiTrust.
- Kalnein, Wend von (1995). Architecture in France in the Eighteenth Century. New Haven: Yale University Press. ISBN 9780300060133.
- Ochterbeck, Cynthia Clayton, editor (2009). The Green Guide Paris. Greenville, South Carolina: Michelin Maps and Guides. ISBN 9781906261375.
