= Petit-Beurre =

French shortbread

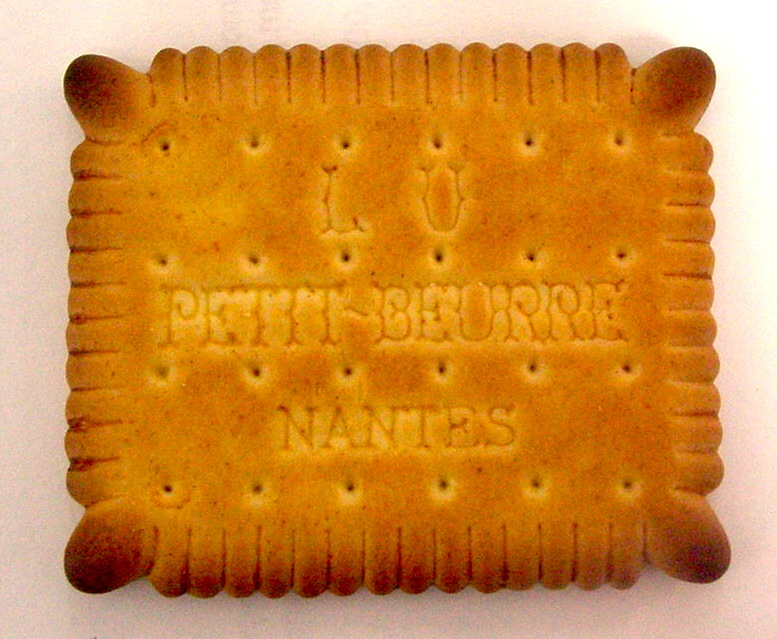
A Petit-Beurre

The Petit Beurre, also known as Véritable Petit Beurre (VPB), is a type of shortbread from Nantes, France. The biscuits of the Lefèvre-Utile company are the most commercially successful variety, although its name is not exclusive to LU. It was invented in 1886 by Louis Lefèvre-Utile in the city of Nantes and was inspired by some English products of the time.

The substantive Petit Beurre is a generic term from the past; it has a hyphen and when it is plural Petit-beurre is often misspelled. It is known in Anglosphere countries as the French Petit Beurre, as "Petibör" or "Pötibör" or “Etibör” (as called by TDK, Eti, and Ülker) in Turkey, "Πτι-Μπερ"/ "PteeBer" in Greece, "پُتی‌بور"/"Pötibör" or "پِتی‌بور"/"Petibör" in Iran, and "פתיבר/Pettiber" in Israel, where a dairy-free version is a popular snack (the removal of dairy products allowing it to comply with Kashrut restrictions).

== Le Petit Beurre LU ==
Le Petit Beurre LU was invented by Louis Lefèvre-Utile, son of Pauline Lefèvre-Utile, in 1886. A cookie cutter in the form of Petit Beurre was made on September 8, 1886. But Louis Lefèvre did not file the trademark "Petit Beurre LU" until April 9, 1888 to the Nantes Commercial Courts.

== Characteristics ==
They measure 65 mm long, 54 mm wide, and 6.5 mm thick for a unit weight of 8.33 g. The surface of the biscuit is smooth and has twenty-four indents (four lines with six columns) intermixed with the inscription "LU PETIT-BEURRE NANTES" in three lines. The characters of the writing are intended to be a reminder of the writing books that the grandmother of one of the creators of Le Petit Beurre would read. The biscuit is watered with milk before baking to get a "homemade" look. The thickness of eight biscuits is equal to the width, which allows a cubic packaging.

== Fabrication ==
At its plant in La Haie-Fouassière, about twenty kilometers south of Nantes, LU produces over 9,000 tons of VPB a year, about 1 billion biscuits packaged in 41 million packs of VPB.

== Decoration ==
Le Petit Beurre LU is decorated with four corners in the shape of ears, fourteen teeth in length, ten teeth in width or fifty-two teeth in total, and presents twenty-four indents in four lines of six. These numbers could be interpreted: the four seasons, the fifty-two weeks of the year, or the twenty-four hours in a day.

== Publicity ==
One of the most famous slogans of Petit Beurre is: "Four ears and forty-eight teeth."

== Ingredients and nutrition ==
According to the maker, le Petit Beurre LU contains:

- Wheat flour: 73.5%
- Powdered sugar
- Butter: 13.6%
- Evaporated milk: 1.3%
- Salt
- Baking powder
- Extract or Flavoring

Also according to the same source, the nutritional intake are the following:

	Serving 100 g	Serving: 1 biscuit
Energetic Value	440 cal – 1850 kJ	36 cal – 154 kJ
Protein	8 g	0,7 g
Carbohydrates	73 g	6,1 g
Lipids	12 g	1 g

== Other Petits Beurre ==
When designing the Petit Beurre, Louis Lefèvre-Utile was quickly copied by his competitors. He then set up a rather virulent advertising campaign in which he renamed his biscuit the "Véritable Petit Beurre" or "True Petit Beurre". After many years, he managed to impose the basic recipe, without chemical additives, reducing the number of competitors.

Another sweet butter biscuit produced in France is known as the "Petit beurre with Lorient sea salt.”

In 1891, at Hanover in Germany, the Bahlsen company began making a Butterkeks (butter biscuit very similar to the French Petit Beurre) called Leibniz-Keks in homage to the philosopher and mathematician Gottfried Wilhelm von Leibniz. Today many other companies throughout the world make similar biscuits.

== See also ==
- List of cookies
