= Marie Crous =

French mathematician

Marie Crous (fl. 1641) was a French mathematician. She is known for two publications: a 1636 study in which she contributed to the further development of arithmetic using decimal fractions, and a 1641 textbook of practical arithmetic rules. She proposed the introduction of the decimal system in France as early as 1636.

== Life and work ==
Little is known about Crous's life; the dates of her birth and death are also unclear. By her own statement, she was of modest origins. She was the tutor of Charlotte de Caumont La Force, a girl from a noble Huguenot family, and enjoyed the patronage of the salonnière Madame de Combalet, the Duchess d'Aiguillion, a niece of Cardinal Richelieu.

Crous has remained well known through two publications:

- Advis de Marie Crous aux filles exersantes l'arithmetique: sur les dixmes ou dixiesme du sieur Stevin. 1636 - a study on decimals building on the work of Simon Stevin
- Abbrégé recherché de Marie Crous. Pour tirer la solution de toutes propositions d'aritmetique, dependantes des reigles y contenuës. 1641 - a textbook of rules of arithmetic especially for use in trade and industry.

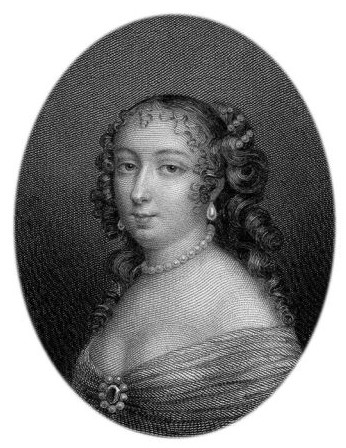
The Duchesse d'Aiguillon, who was the patron of Marie Crous and sponsored her research.

Crous's work goes beyond the common arithmetic books of her time. The Advis includes a presentation of decimal fractions, based on Simon Stevin's work De Thiende. She introduced a change from Stevin's work: the introduction of a period (now a comma in many countries) to separate the units from the decimal part, and the zero to indicate that a given position is empty. The Abbrégé is a survey of arithmetic rules, including for use in mental arithmetic.

Crous argues that both her books should be used in conjunction. She presented her work as study material for women and girls who wanted to study arithmetic "out of interest or necessity". The Advis is dedicated to her pupil Charlotte de Caumont La Force. The Abbrégé is dedicated to Madame de Combalet, her patroness. In the preface to the Advis, she proposed the introduction of a decimal metric system of weights and measures in France; this would not happen until the end of the eighteenth century.
