= Marie Madeleine de Vignerot =

Duchess of Aiguillon, French aristocrat, patron of the arts and mathematics

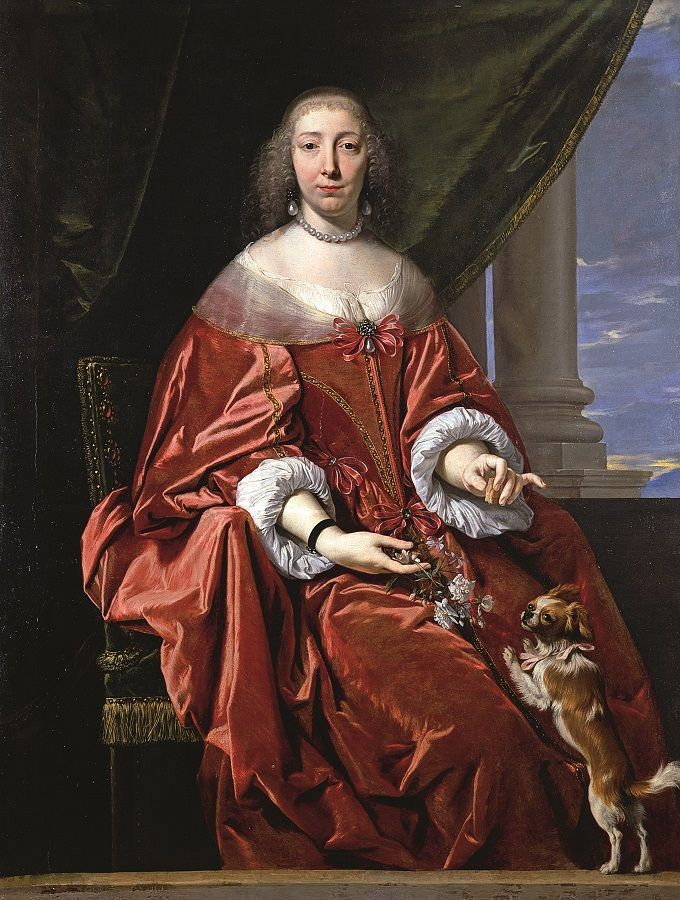
The Duchess of Aiguillon

Marie-Madeleine de Vignerot de Pontcourlay, suo jure Duchess of Aiguillon (French pronunciation: [maʁi madlɛn də viɲʁo də pɔ̃kuʁlɛ]; 1604 – 17 April 1675) was a French aristocrat, also remembered for her charitable work and her patronage of artists and mathematicians.

== Biography ==
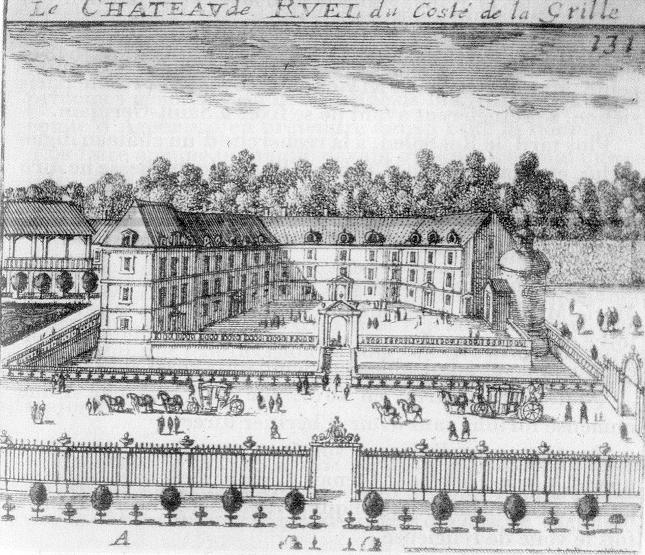
Château du Val de Ruel

Marie de Vignerot was the daughter of Cardinal Richelieu's sister, Françoise du Plessis (d. 1615), and her husband, René de Vignerot, Seigneur de Pontcourlay (d. 1625).

At her uncle the Cardinal Richelieu's behest, Marie traveled from her home in rural France to Paris and married a nephew of the constable de Luynes, Antoine de Beauvoir du Roure, sieur de Combalet, in 1620. He died only two years later in 1622. Marie did not marry a second time, although Richelieu wished to marry her to a prince, either to the comte de Soissons or to the only brother of the King. Marie herself expressed a wish to become a nun several times, this, however, was opposed by her uncle and she never joined a convent, even after his death.

In 1625, through her uncle's influence, Marie was made a lady-in-waiting (dame d'atour) to the queen-mother Marie de Medici.

In 1638 Marie de Vignerot was made Duchess of Aiguillon.

When Cardinal Richelieu died in 1642, Marie de Vignerot retained her honours and titles. The Cardinal's will gifted Marie with any ready gold and silver belonging to him, as well as the Petit Luxembourg, the Château de Rueil, and a portion of his art collection. He entrusted her with his legacy by leaving her most of his state and some of his private papers. The Cardinal also made her the administrator-in-trust responsible for managing everything he left to his primary heir, Armand-Jean, her 10 year old nephew.

Though she had no children of her own, she was involved in the upbringing of several of her nieces and nephews, and brought up her orphaned grandnieces and grandnephew as well.

The Duchess became a patron of science and the arts. She both provided funding and was actively involved in many notable charitable initiatives.

She died on 17 April 1675 and was buried at the convent of Carmel de l'Incarnation in Paris.

== Patron of Science and Arts ==
Marie de Vignerot attended the Chambre Bleue (Blue Room) salon of the Hôtel de Rambouillet. There she encountered ideas about literature, the arts, patronage, and intellectual empowerment. She also notably befriended Catherine de Rambouillet, Julie d'Angennes, Madeleine de Souvré--marquise de Sablé, Anne de Neufbourg du Vigean, and Cardinal de La Valette.

The Duchess became a patroness of playwright Pierre Corneille, who in 1636 dedicated his tragedy Le Cid to her. Corneille in turn introduced Marie to the later influential Pascal siblings--the eldest sister Gilberte, the poet Jacqueline and the mathematician Blaise. Marie in turn provided the Pascal siblings a successful opportunity to seek pardon from her uncle the Cardinal Richelieu as their father had been exiled from Paris. Marie also had the vision to provide patronage to Marie Crous, a mathematician who introduced the decimal system to France with her published research.

She commissioned the grand funerary sculpture by François Girardon for her uncle, the Cardinal Richelieu's tomb in the Sorbonne Chapel, though it would not be finished until after her own death.

== Charitable & Religious Work ==
The Duchess co-founded the Daughters of Charity (Filles de la Filles de la Charité) with the future Saint Vincent de Paull ; the Daughters of Charity ran a range of charitable centers for the poor and sick and opened many schools for girls in both urban and rural areas. She financially supported Vincent de Paul's Congrégation de la Mission or Lazarists, as they were later known, through the rest of her life. She worked with de Paul and helped him to establish the Bicêtre Hospital for foundlings. She also took part in re-organising the Hôtel-Dieu de Paris and establishing several others in the provinces. Additionally, she founded and funded the establishment of the Hôtel-Dieu de Québec for the colonists of New France.

== In Fiction ==
Marie de Vignerot (referred to as either Duchesse d'Aiguillon or as Madame Combalet) is depicted by Alexandre Dumas in his novels as both the niece and scandalous mistress of Cardinal Richelieu. In The Comte de Moret (also published as the Red Sphinx) she is depicted as a hypocritical prude who dresses as a nun in public while wearing sheer clothing in private.
