= Hippolyte Berteaux =

French painter

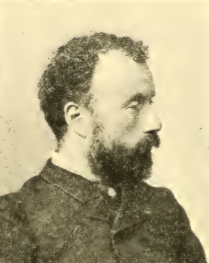
Hippolyte Berteaux (c. 1898)

Hippolyte-Dominique Berteaux (28 March 1843 – 17 October 1926) was a French painter who specialized in murals and portraits.

== Biography ==
He was born in Saint-Quentin, Aisne. He studied painting at the École Nationale Supérieure des Beaux-Arts, where he worked in the studios of Hippolyte Flandrin, Léon Cogniet and Paul Baudry. From 1872 to 1875, he was employed as "Painter to the Sultan" in Istanbul.

He then moved to Nantes, where he created portraits, genre scenes and landscapes; with the local dunes being a favorite subject. He also devoted himself to decorative painting. His most notable works of that type are the murals on the ceiling of the Théâtre Graslin, and the staircases at the Musée des Beaux-Arts and the Hôtel de Ville. Later, he would decorate a ceiling section at the Petit Luxembourg.

He exhibited at the Salon des Artistes Français, where he obtained a second-class medal in 1885. After that, he would exhibit "out of competition". Beginning in 1901, he sent his works to be shown at the Salon of the Société Nationale des Beaux-Arts.

In 1891, he was named a Knight in the Legion of Honor; becoming an Officer in 1923.

He died in 1926 in Paris and is interred at the Cimetière du Montparnasse. His works may be seen at the Musée des Beaux-Arts de Carcassonne, Musée d'Arts de Nantes, Musée d'Orsay, the Musée des Beaux-Arts de Quimper and the Musée des Beaux-Arts de Rennes.

== Selected paintings ==
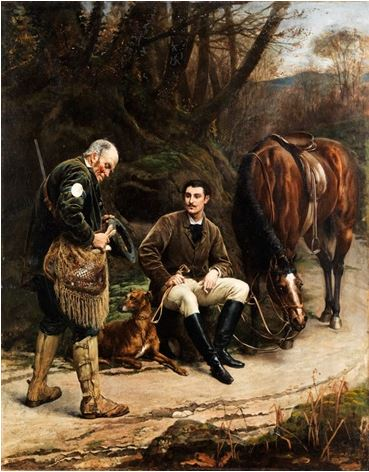
Young Horseman,
Old Hunter

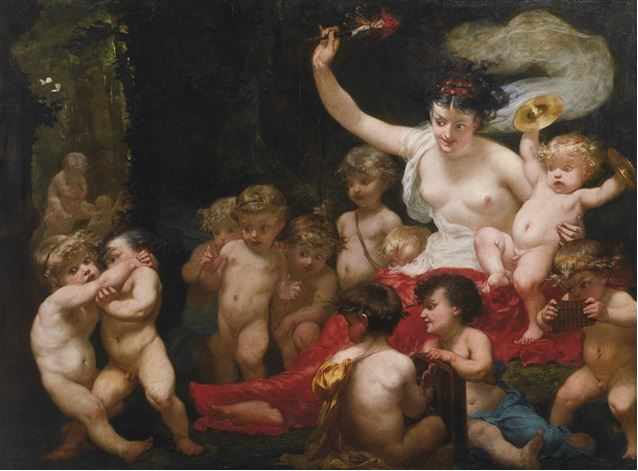
Madness and Childish Games

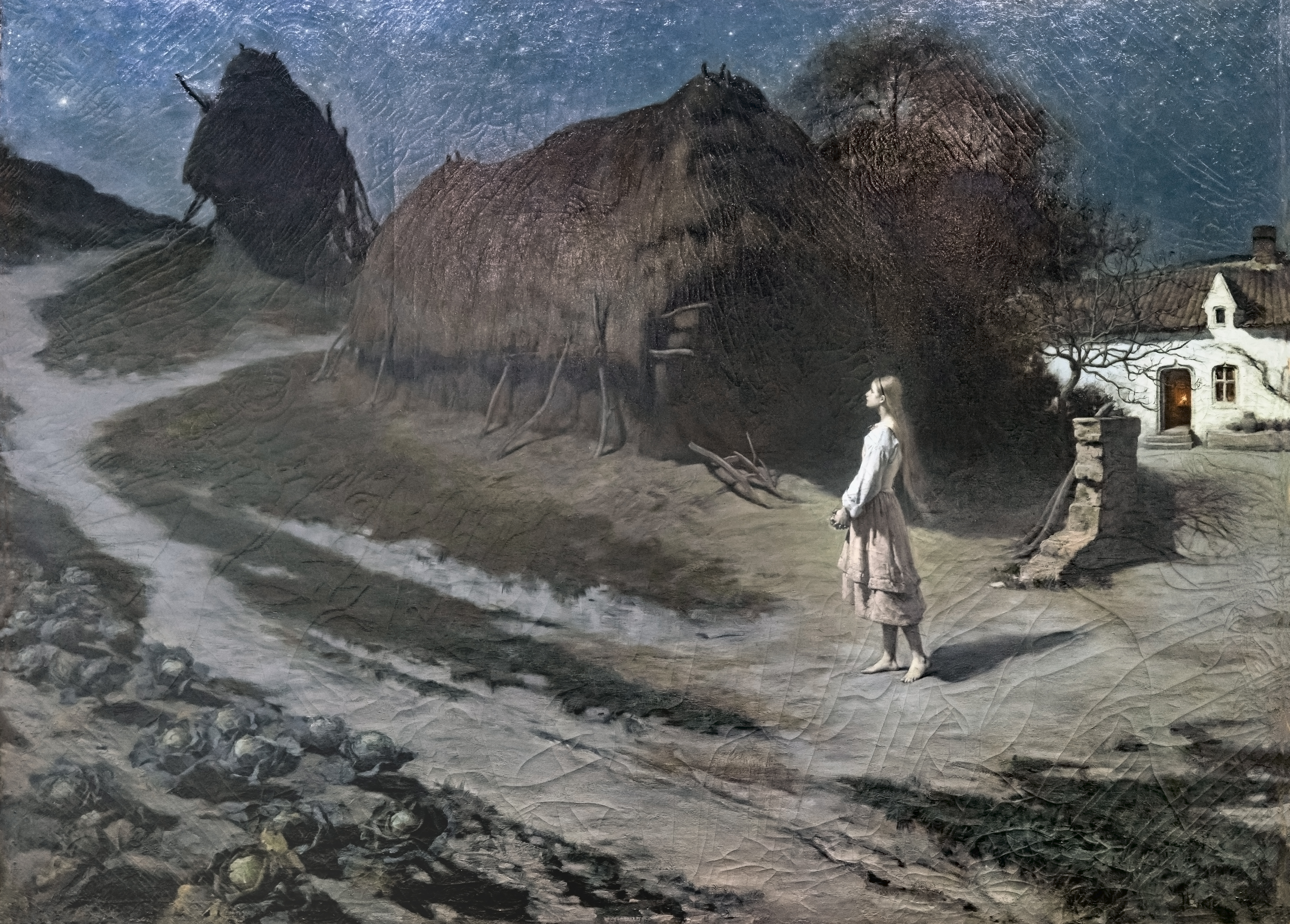
The Young Shepherdess

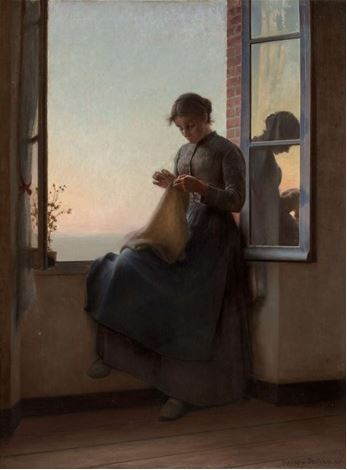
The End of the Day
