= Vienna Fingers =

American cookie brand

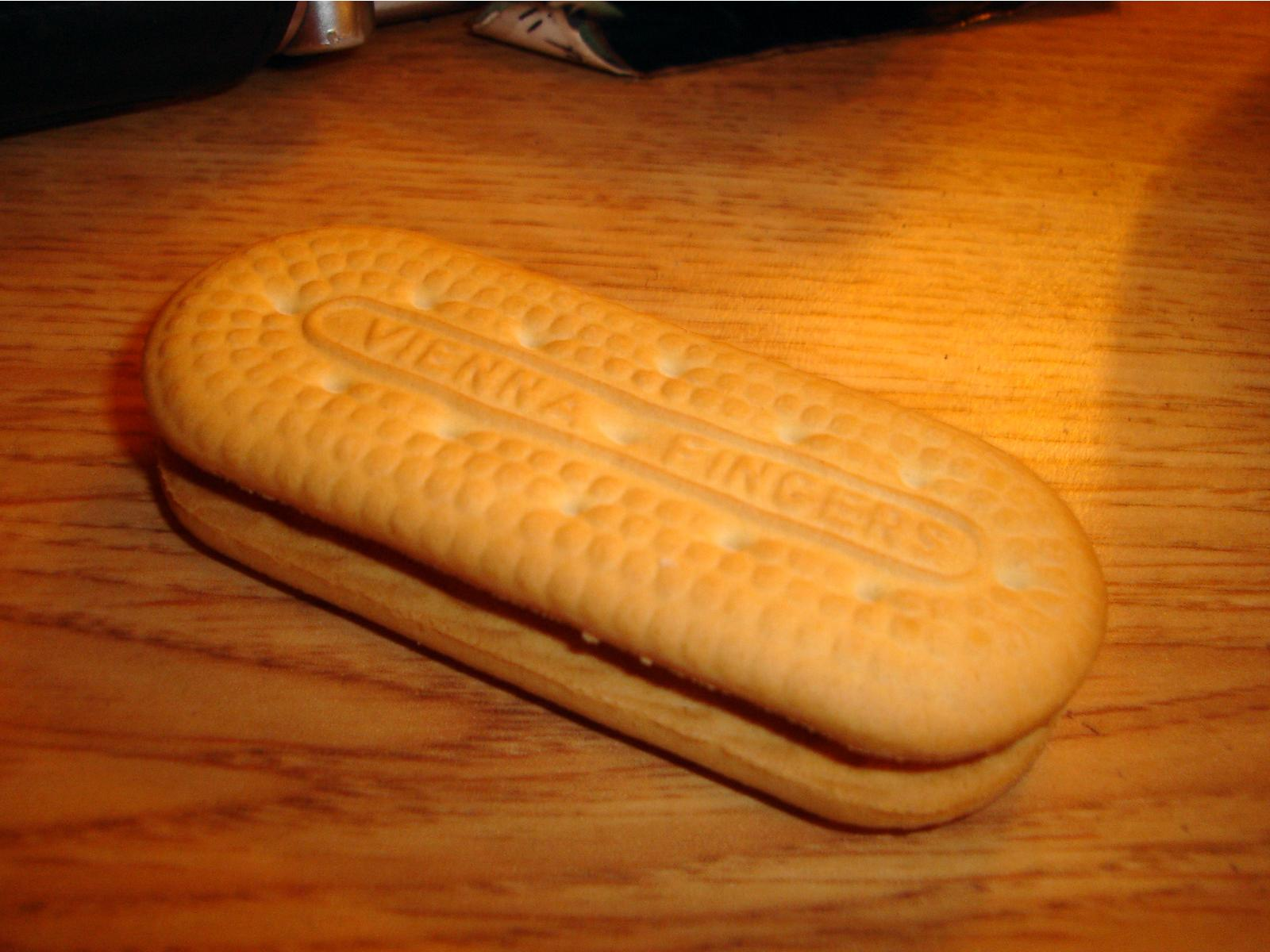
Close up of a Vienna Finger

Vienna Fingers is an American brand of cookie made by the Keebler Company, a division of Ferrero SpA. They consist of a sandwich of vanilla flavored outer crust filled with vanilla cream flavored filling. Akin to an Oreo, the surface is textured and embossed with the product name, but Vienna Fingers have a round-ended 'finger' shape. They come in a red and yellow accented rectangular package with the words "Vienna Fingers" in white lettering. Nabisco's Cameo is similar.

== History ==
Vienna Fingers were one of the products originally sold by Sunshine Biscuits. The cookies first were marketed by Sunshine Biscuits in 1915 and trademarked as "Vienna Fingers Sandwich" in November 1947. The popularity of the Vienna Fingers cookies was memorialized by American playwright and screenwriter Neil Simon in his 1965 play The Odd Couple, which was adapted into a 1968 comedy film. In the play, Oscar Madison attempts to distract a depressed Felix Ungar with snack food: "How about vanilla wafers? Or Vienna fingers? I got everything."

In January 1985, the product was renamed "Vienna Fingers". At the Food Marketing Institute's 1994 Supermarket convention, both low-fat Hydrox cookies and reduced-fat Vienna Fingers were introduced by Sunshine Biscuits.

In late August 1994, Sunshine Biscuits donated over 21,000 Vienna Fingers and Hydrox cookies to a contingent of American troops from Fort Eustis Army Base. The company's action was a follow-up to a similar Sunshine shipment sent to troops during the 1990–1991 Gulf War and a soldier's scrawled response note on an Oreo box, "Please deploy cookies." In the company's words, "the donation of these cookie favorites will give the troops a taste of home and make their time away from their families a little more pleasant." The Vienna Fingers and Hydrox cookies were brought with the troops to the refugee-filled border area between Rwanda and Zaire.

When Keebler purchased Sunshine Biscuits in 1996, it retained the product as part of its line. At the time of Keebler's acquisition, Vienna Fingers brought in $50 million in sales annually. Following the acquisition of the product line by Keebler, a lemon filling version of the cookie was introduced.
