= 2021 Nabisco strike =

American labor action

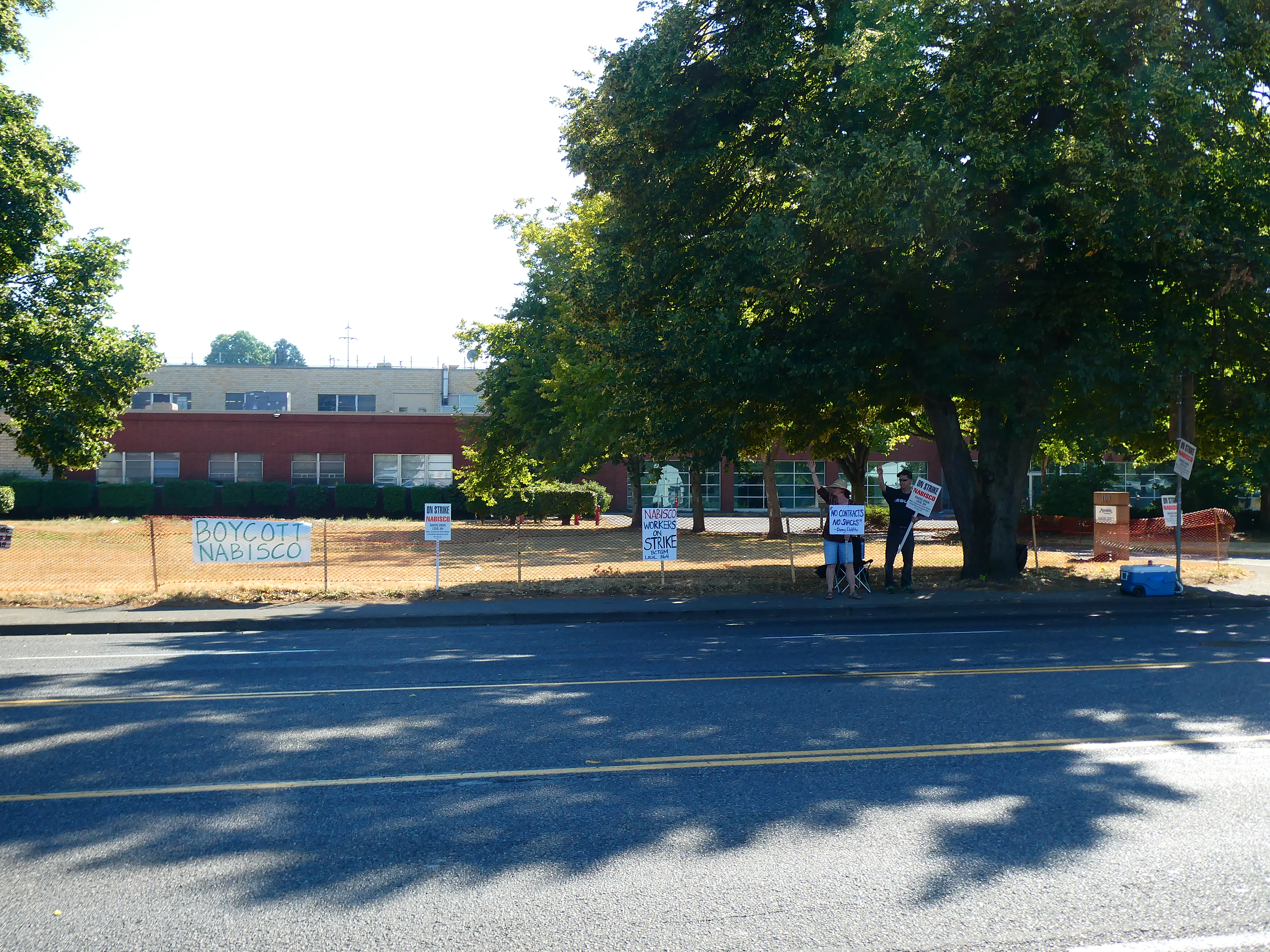
- Picketing outside the Portland facility, August 28
- Date: August 10 – September 18, 2021 (1 month, 1 week and 1 day)
- Location: United States: Aurora, Colorado; Norcross, Georgia; Addison, Illinois; Chicago, Illinois; Portland, Oregon; Richmond, Virginia
- Caused by: Disagreements over terms of new labor contracts
- Goals: Guarantees against outsourcing; Blocking changes to current scheduling and overtime systems; Blocking changes to the company's healthcare plan
- Methods: Boycott; Picketing; Strike action; Walkout
- Result: $5,000 bonus; Annual pay raises; Increased 401(k) contributions

Parties
Bakery, Confectionery, Tobacco Workers and Grain Millers' International Union: Local 1 (Addison and Chicago); Local 26 (Aurora); Local 42 (Norcross); Local 358 (Richmond); Local 364 (Portland)	Nabisco

The 2021 Nabisco strike was a labor strike involving workers for the American snack manufacturer Nabisco, a subsidiary of Mondelez International. The strike began at a Nabisco facility in Portland, Oregon on August 10 and over the next few days spread to several more Nabisco facilities throughout the United States.

The strike was caused due to disagreements between Nabisco and the Bakery, Confectionery, Tobacco Workers and Grain Millers' International Union concerning new labor contracts after the previous ones had expired in mid-2021. In particular, the company was seeking changes in scheduling and overtime pay as well as the introduction of a new healthcare plan. The labor union was opposed to these changes and additionally wanted safeguards against possible outsourcing to Nabisco plants in Mexico. As a result of an impasse between the union and company, members of the local union at the Nabisco plant in Portland performed a walkout on August 10, initiating the strike. Over the next several days, other local unions at Nabisco facilities throughout the United States also joined in striking against the company, and by August 23, it had affected every bakery and distribution facility in the country. The strike is Nabisco's first since a 56-day strike in 1969.

On September 15, the union and company announced that they had reached a tentative agreement that would end the strike, with voting amongst union members to commence in the following days. On September 18, union members voted to accept the agreement, thus ending the strike. Terms of the contract included pay raises, increased contributions to the workers' 401(k) accounts, and a $5,000 bonus.

== Background ==
=== Nabisco and the BCTGM ===
Nabisco is a subsidiary of the American confectionary company Mondelez International that is well known for its various brands of snack foods, such as Oreo, Chips Ahoy!, and Ritz Crackers, among others. Going into 2021, the company operated several production facilities in the United States whose workers were unionized with the Bakery, Confectionery, Tobacco Workers and Grain Millers' International Union (BCTGM), with locations in Atlanta, Georgia; Fair Lawn, New Jersey; Portland, Oregon; Richmond, Virginia; and Chicago, Illinois. However, by mid-2021, amidst the COVID-19 pandemic, the company closed their Atlanta and Fair Lawn facilities, which resulted in the loss of about 1,000 union jobs. (Note: Equal to the loss of approximately half of Nabisco's unionized workforce at that time.)

=== Contract negotiations ===
In May 2021, the labor contracts between Nabisco and the BCTGM expired without replacement contracts in place. Discussions between the union and company were at a standstill, with the company pushing for concessions in the next contract. In particular, in 2018, Nabisco stated that they would stop offering pension benefits, which was a major point of contention with the union. As a replacement, the company instituted a 401(k) program, though the union was seeking the reinstitution of the pension plan.

Some employees at the three plants also expressed concerns that their jobs could be outsourced to Nabisco plants in Mexico that had recently opened, though Nabisco has claimed that the plant closures in Atlanta and Fair Lawn did not result in those jobs being outsourced to the Mexican plants. Despite this, a local union at one of the American facilities filed a Trade Adjustment Assistance petition with the United States Department of Labor. In an interview with Vice in August, one employee stated, "There’s a constant threat of if you don’t agree to concessions, we'll leave". Speaking about this issue, a union representative stated, "There’s no animosity on our part towards the Mexican workers. Our animosity is towards the company. The Mexican workers are just getting exploited." As a result of the concerns, the union was seeking safeguards against potential outsourcing to the Mexican plants.

Other points of contention between the company and union included the company pushing for mandatory weekend work, changing 8-hour shifts to 12-hour shifts without overtime pay, and creating a healthcare plan that would include two-tiers, which would increase costs for new hires. Around the time the contracts had expired, several employees stated that it was not uncommon for workers to work 6 to 7 days per week for 12- to 16-hour shifts during the pandemic. These longer shifts were implemented by the company in order to keep up with an increased demand for snacks during the COVID-19 pandemic. According to a representative for BCTGM Local 364 (representing the workers in Portland), the existing pay system included time-and-a-half pay for overtime and any work on Saturday and double pay for any work on Sunday, but the new system proposed by Nabisco would see a flat pay rate, regardless of days, until the worker reached 40 hours for a week. One worker at the Portland facility estimated that these changes could result in some workers making approximately $10,000 less per year than with the existing system. (Note: Reported in some sources as between $10,000 and $40,000 annually.) Nabisco was pushing for these changes during a time when the company was reporting increased revenue, with a revenue increase of about 12 percent compared to the previous year. Additionally, Nabisco's parent company nearly doubled their profits in the most recent fiscal quarter of 2021. Speaking of this, one union representative stated, "This company made record profits throughout the pandemic and then they come to the table and they want concessions. It’s absolutely a slap in the face."

=== Prelude to strike action ===
By August 10, Local 364 had been negotiating with Mondelez for about three weeks. On that day, with a breakdown in negotiations, workers at the facility performed a walkout, initiating strike action against the company. The strike action came approximately a month after the 2021 Frito-Lay strike, which also involved members of the BCTGM. Both strikes occurred during a large growth in the snack industry caused by the pandemic. This also marked the first strike action at Nabisco in 52 years, with the last incident lasting 56 days in 1969, and occurred amidst a nationwide labor shortage.

== Course of the strike ==
The strike began at the Portland facility on August 10 with a walkout that involved about 200 workers. On that day, they began picketing outside of the plant. Other union workers at the Portland plant, such as electricians and machinists, agreed to not cross the picket line in solidarity with Local 364. On August 13, the company erected a fence around the property, causing the picket line to move closer to the nearby thoroughfare in what one union representative claimed was "definitely an intimidation thing". The following Saturday, August 14, a rally was held outside the plant that was attended by hundreds of supporters, including Oregon Secretary of State Shemia Fagan, Oregon State Representative Rachel Prusak, and Oregon AFL–CIO President Graham Trainor. Members of other local unions also attended in support of the strike. In addition, members of other bakery unions began organizing a boycott of Nabisco products in solidarity with the BCTGM strikers. In another show of inter-union support, members of Railroad Workers United refused to deliver baking supplies to the Portland facility when they saw the workers on strike. This came after a striking baker at the Portland facility stopped a Union Pacific supply train bound for the facility and explained to the union-member train engineer that they were on strike, after which the train reversed course. A spokesman for Union Pacific later stated that they were not servicing the facility due to the strike.

== Strike spreads to other locations ==
Shortly after the Portland strike began, local unions at other Nabisco facilities began preparing for additional strike action. On August 12, BCTGM Local 26 in Aurora began their own strike, with the local union further claiming that Nabisco had violated the Fair Labor Standards Act by trying to negotiate directly with employees at the facility. On August 16, about 400 members of Local 358 in Richmond also went on strike. That same day, Mondelez issued a press release where they stated that they were dedicated to continuing to bargain "in good faith" with the union. August 19 saw Local 1, representing workers at a production facility in Chicago, also join in striking against Nabisco, picketing the facility in the city's Marquette Park neighborhood. The strike action also affected a distribution facility in nearby Addison, Illinois. With the strike action at the Chicago plant, WBUR-FM reported that "all major U.S. bakeries" that produce Nabisco products were on strike. Also following the start of strike action in Chicago, it was reported that over 1,000 workers were now involved in the strike. On August 23, Local 42 at a distribution center in Norcross, Georgia (near Atlanta) also joined the strike. With the Norcross action, all Nabisco bakeries and distribution facilities in the United States were now involved in the strike. As the strike spread, many supermarkets began to stock up on Nabisco products, predicting a shortage as the strike continued.

== Politicians and celebrities voice their support ==
On August 18, actor Danny DeVito tweeted a statement in support of the striking BCTGM members and the boycott of Nabisco products. Following the tweet, DeVito's Twitter account was temporarily unverified, which was reported on by several sources. Twitter later stated that the incident was unrelated to the tweet and was due to issues regarding his account information. Additional support has been shown by actress Susan Sarandon, former United States Secretary of Labor Robert Reich, and U.S. Senator Bernie Sanders of Vermont. On August 24, members of the Black, Indigenous, and People of Color (BIPOC) Caucus of the Oregon Legislative Assembly sent a letter to Mondelez International that urged the company to negotiate for a new contract with the strikers. Oregon State Senator Lew Frederick, who is a member of the BIPOC Caucus, represents the area of the state that is home to the Nabisco plant. The caucus was joined by both of Oregon's Senators (Jeff Merkley and Ron Wyden) and U.S. Representative Earl Blumenauer, who also sent letters to Mondelez CEO Dirk Van de Put in support of the strikers. In addition, Speaker of the Oregon House of Representatives Tina Kotek stated her intent to join with strikers on the picket line as a show of support. Similarly, on September 1, U.S. Representative Jesús "Chuy" García expressed his intent to join with picketers in Chicago, while Portland commissioners Jo Ann Hardesty and Carmen Rubio did so on September 4.

== Continued strike action ==
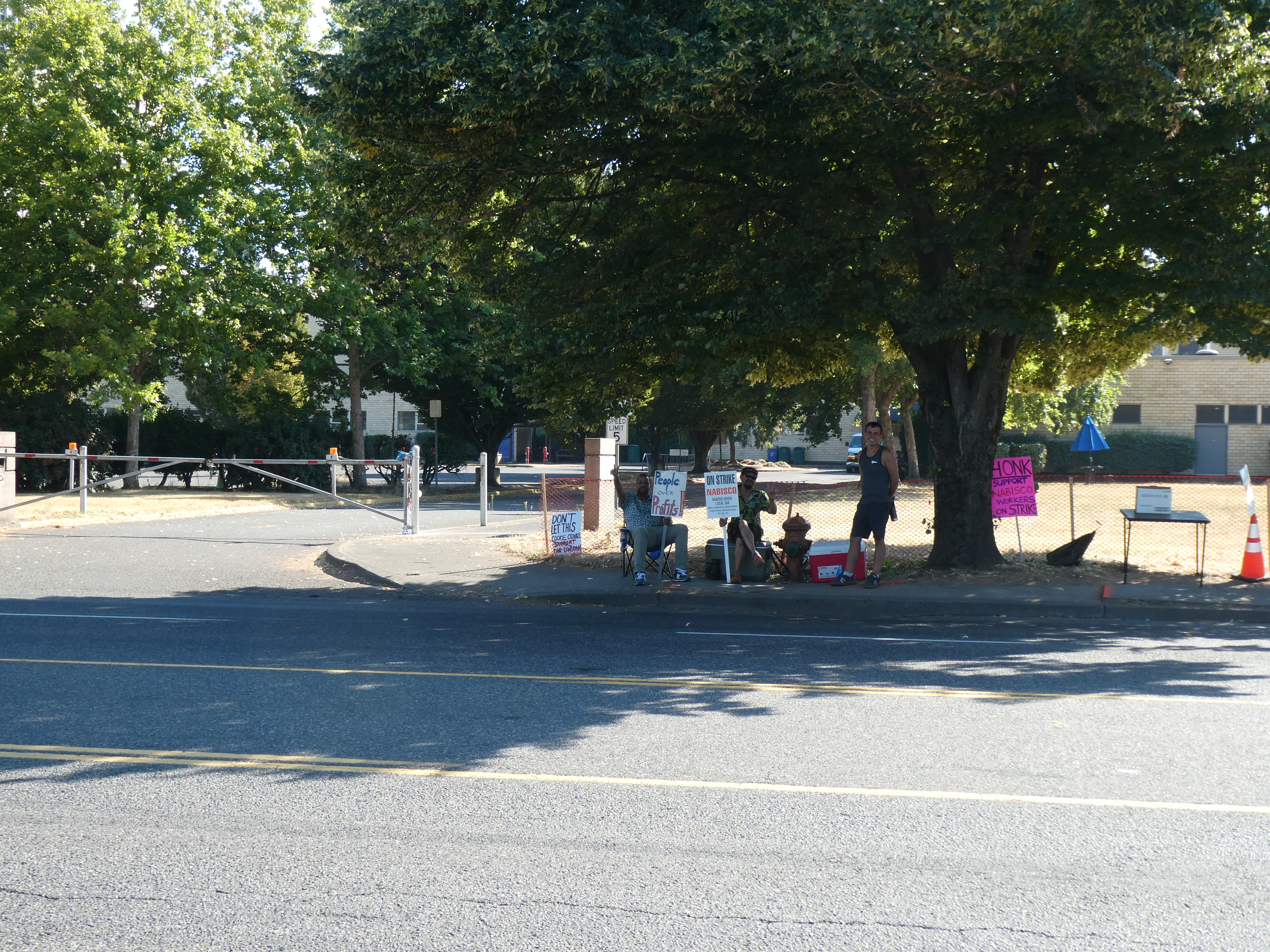
Picketing outside the Portland plant on August 28

On August 23, representatives for both the union and company met to discuss negotiations, during which time the company stated that they were standing by their initial offer. The following day, Cheddar News reported that Nabisco was bringing in replacement workers. A later article from Cheddar published on August 27 stated that, while Mondelez's stock price had dropped approximately 2.4 percent for the month, the production facilities were still operating with nonunion strikebreakers. The Portland-based alternative newspaper Willamette Week also reported on the use of strikebreakers at the Portland facility in an August 26 article, stating that workers were being bused in daily. When asked by the newspaper about the use of nonunion workers during the strike, Mondelez did not respond. However, several days into the strike, Mondelez stated that they would be initiating a contingency plan to keep their facilities operational during the course of the strike, seemingly alluding to the use of nonunion workers. A representative for Local 1 in Chicago said that Mondelez was bringing in "retirees and managers" to operate the facilities there, but that "[t]hey barely have enough people to run one line". Around the same time that replacement workers were allegedly being used at the Portland facility, Willamette Week reported that strikers had been joined by various leftist protesters, many of whom had been involved in protests during the 2020–2021 United States racial unrest. Among other things, these protesters blockaded parking lots where suspected replacement workers boarded vehicles that took them to the facility and set off car alarms at hotels where the replacement workers were reportedly staying. The blockade in particular led to a brief altercation with company-hired security guards and led to police being called on the protesters.

On August 31, Nabisco sent a cease and desist letter to the bakers union at the Portland facility warning legal action for continued interference in their operations, and several days later on September 2, officers from the Portland Police Bureau removed strikers from near the train tracks where they had been protesting. According to some strikers, this came after Nabisco hired a surveying company to confirm that the strip of land near the railroad tracks that the strikers had been protesting in was owned by the company. On September 2, Nabisco submitted a contract offer to the union that was rejected and later expired on September 7. Terms of the proposed contract would have included a $5,000 bonus for each worker, as well as increases in both annual wages and 401(k) matches. On September 8, Nabisco announced a collaboration with The Pokémon Company with the release of limited edition Pokémon-themed Oreos. The announcement was widely reported on in light of the boycott against Nabisco products, with articles published in Kotaku and AsiaOne questioning the ethicality of purchasing them. Over the course of the strike, the boycott gained attention over social media sites such as Reddit and Facebook, with some supporters of the strike posting pictures of fully-stocked shelves of Nabisco products at stores as proof of the boycott's effectiveness.

Also on September 2, AFL–CIO President Liz Shuler met with picketing strikers in Richmond to voice the AFL–CIO's continued support for the strike. The following day, at a consumer conference, Van de Put stated that production levels at Nabisco were "not to the same level" as before the strike and that another round of discussions between the company and union were scheduled for the following week. These would be the first direct discussions between the two groups since July. Through mid-September, protesters in Portland began to speak about an increased level of violence from the security guards, who were from the Michigan-based security firm Huffmaster. Reporters from local television station KATU reported increased incidents of confrontations between protesters and security guards hired by Nabisco, and on September 14, a member of the International Brotherhood of Teamsters who had been protesting with the striking workers filed a federal lawsuit against Huffmaster, claiming that one of the guards had committed assault and battery on him. That same day, members of the National Women's Soccer League team Portland Thorns FC joined the picket line in support of the striking workers.

== End of the strike ==
On September 15, BCTGM and Mondelez released statements saying that the two had come to a tentative agreement that could see an end to the strike. While the details of the agreement were not made public at that time, BCTGM President Anthony Shelton stated that the proposed contract would be presented for a vote by union members in the next few days. However, picketing and strike activities would continue until the agreement is ratified. The agreement was reached following an intense round of bargaining that had taken place over the previous two days. On September 18, the union announced that the contract had been ratified by its members, with the strikers to return to their jobs that week, thus ending the strike. The four-year contract was retroactive to March 1, 2021, and, according to the union, included increases to pay and 401(k) contributions as well as other policy changes. While neither the company nor union revealed specifics, the progressive media organization More Perfect Union stated that the contract included a 2.25 percent pay increase for 2021 and $0.60 hourly wage increases for each year after that. Additionally, workers would receive a $5,000 bonus and Nabisco would increase its 401(k) matching contributions from 25 percent to 50 percent, up to 6 percent of the worker's total pay. No change was made to the workers' healthcare plan. The contract was approved with over 75 percent of the vote. Despite this, some workers at the Portland facility expressed dissatisfaction with some of the terms of the agreement, including provisions that they stated would lead to broader alternative scheduling.

== See also ==
- Oreo boycott
- Strikes during the COVID-19 pandemic
