= Jacob Loose =

American philanthropist and businessman (1850–1923)

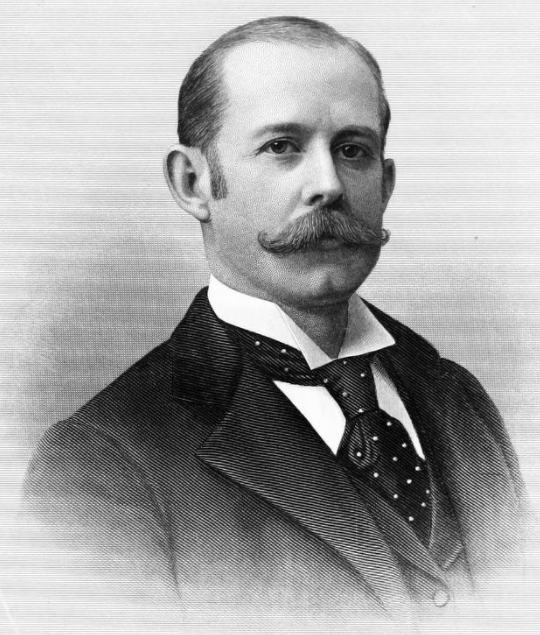
- 1896 portrait of Loose
- Born: Jacob Leander Loose; June 17, 1850; Greencastle, Indiana, US
- Died: September 18, 1923 (aged 73); Gloucester, Massachusetts, US
- Burial place: Elmwood Cemetery, Kansas City, Missouri, US
- Occupations: Philanthropist, businessman
- Spouse: Ella Clark (m. 1878)

Signature
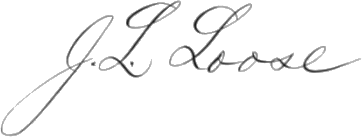

Jacob Leander Loose (June 17, 1850 – September 18, 1923) was an American philanthropist and businessman who founded Sunshine Biscuits. In 1908, Loose, along with his brother, created Hydrox, the first chocolate sandwich cookie.

== Biography ==
Jacob Loose was born in Greencastle, Indiana on June 17, 1850. He attended high school in Decatur, Illinois, but dropped out at the age of 16. At the age of 20, he moved to Kansas, where he opened a dry goods store with his brother in Chetopa.

In 1878, he married Ella Clark from Carthage, Missouri. They moved to Kansas City in 1882 and entered the cracker business.

== Community involvement ==
Loose started the Children's Mercy's endowment fund in 1913.

He partially retired due to an illness in 1919, and died at the couple's summer home in Gloucester, Massachusetts on September 18, 1923. His funeral in Kansas City was attended by 700 friends and employees. His body was interred in a mausoleum in Elmwood Cemetery.

His will established the Million Dollar Charity Fund.

=== Ella's continued involvement ===
Ella Loose supported many causes, but she especially enjoyed providing for children's needs; the couple had had two children, but both died in infancy. She held an annual "shoe party" at her favorite orphanage, Gillis Orphans' Home, where each child would get a new pair of shoes and a dollar. Ella purchased the land at 52nd and Wornall Road that had once been the Kansas City Country Club, and gifted it to the city in 1927 as a memorial to Jacob. This land became Loose Park. When she died, most of her estate went to the Million Dollar Charity Fund. It was Kansas City's first $1 million foundation. This fund, when combined with other trusts, helped launch the Greater Kansas City Community Foundation and Affiliated Trusts.
