= Oreo boycott =

2015–2016 boycott of food products

Oreo boycott (also known as the Nabisco boycott and Mondelez boycott) is a boycott of the Oreo cookie and other Nabisco-manufactured products, including Chips Ahoy! and Cheese Nips. The boycott was prompted by the Mondelez company's decision to close its American factories and move production to Mexico.

== Background ==
In 2014, Mondelez generated more than $34 billion in revenue and CEO Irene Rosenfeld received $21 million a year in compensation. The pressure to cut American jobs in Mondelez was linked to Bill Ackman, a hedge-fund billionaire who purchased a 7.5 percent stake in Mondelez, and is believed to have pushed for cost cutting.

In 2015, Mondelez International, the parent company of Nabisco, announced that it was laying off workers at factories in Chicago and Philadelphia. Production was moved to Salinas, Mexico. Mondelez decided not to make $120 million in upgrades to their Chicago facility and announced that half of the 1,200 workers at the factory would be laid off.

Before announcing the closure and transfer to Mexico, Mondelez negotiated with unions and the local and federal government. Mondelez asked the worker's unions to take pay cuts to make up the $46 million difference between production in the US and Mexico. According to Mondelez, the three unions representing the workers made demands that could not be satisfied.

The Chicago factory, opened in the 1950s, was previously the largest bakery in the United States and employed over 4,000 workers at its peak. The Chicago factory was considered critical to Mondelez's success because of the unique workforce and strategic Midwest location. Earlier in 2015, Mondelez closed a factory in Philadelphia which was 60 years old and led to the layoff of 350 employees.

== Boycott ==
The announcement of the boycott was made by elected officials in Philadelphia and union activists in Chicago. In a July 9 speech, Congressman Brendan Boyle announced the boycott with a poster of an Oreo cookie with a red circle and line through it, accompanied by the message, "Say no to Oreo." After highlighting the American layoffs, Boyle also sarcastically congratulated CEO Rosenfeld on her pay increase.

In Chicago, veteran activist Marilyn Katz drew attention to the boycott by writing that she was going to stop "dunking". Fellow activists announced that they would buy similar cookies from Trader Joe's or Hydrox rather than Oreo. Others, while supporting the boycott, highlighted the importance of international solidarity.

In August 2015, Presidential candidate Donald Trump announced his support for the boycott, expressing his disappointment because Mondelez was an "American company" and promising never to eat another Oreo. Competitor Hydrox moved to capitalize on the boycott by printing an American flag on their packaging.

In 2016, after production had started in Mexico, the AFL–CIO encouraged the boycott and published consumer guidance to help identify which Mondelez products were made in Mexico.

=== Protest ===
Protests accompanying the boycott specifically targeted Mondelez CEO Irene Rosenfeld. As workers received layoff notices, Rosenfeld was confronted with crowds outside public appearances, led by the Bakery, Confectionery, Tobacco Workers and Grain Millers' International Union. Protestors also appeared outside Rosenfeld's suburban Chicago home.

== See also ==
- 2021 Nabisco strike
