= RWU =

RWU may stand for:

- Railroad Workers United, North America
- Rawalpindi Women University, Pakistan
- Remote wake-up, in computing
- Roger Williams University, Rhode Island, US
