= Loose Park =

Public park in Kansas City, Missouri

- Interactive map of Loose Park
- Type: Urban park
- Location: Kansas City, Missouri, United States
- Coordinates: 39.0317°N 94.5947°W
- Established: 1925; 101 years ago
- Owner: City of Kansas City, Missouri
- Website: https://kcparks.org/park/loose-park/

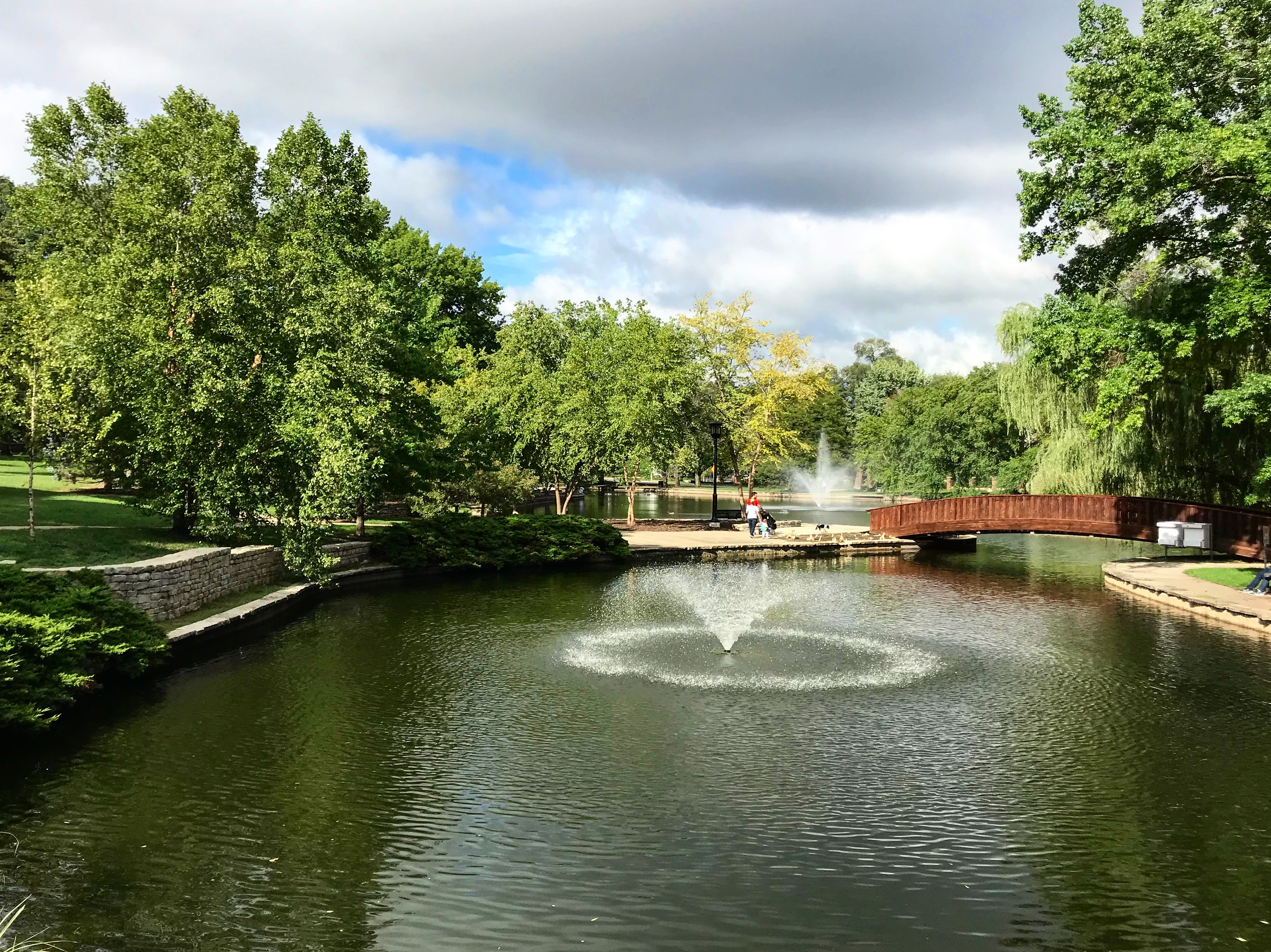
The duck pond and fountains

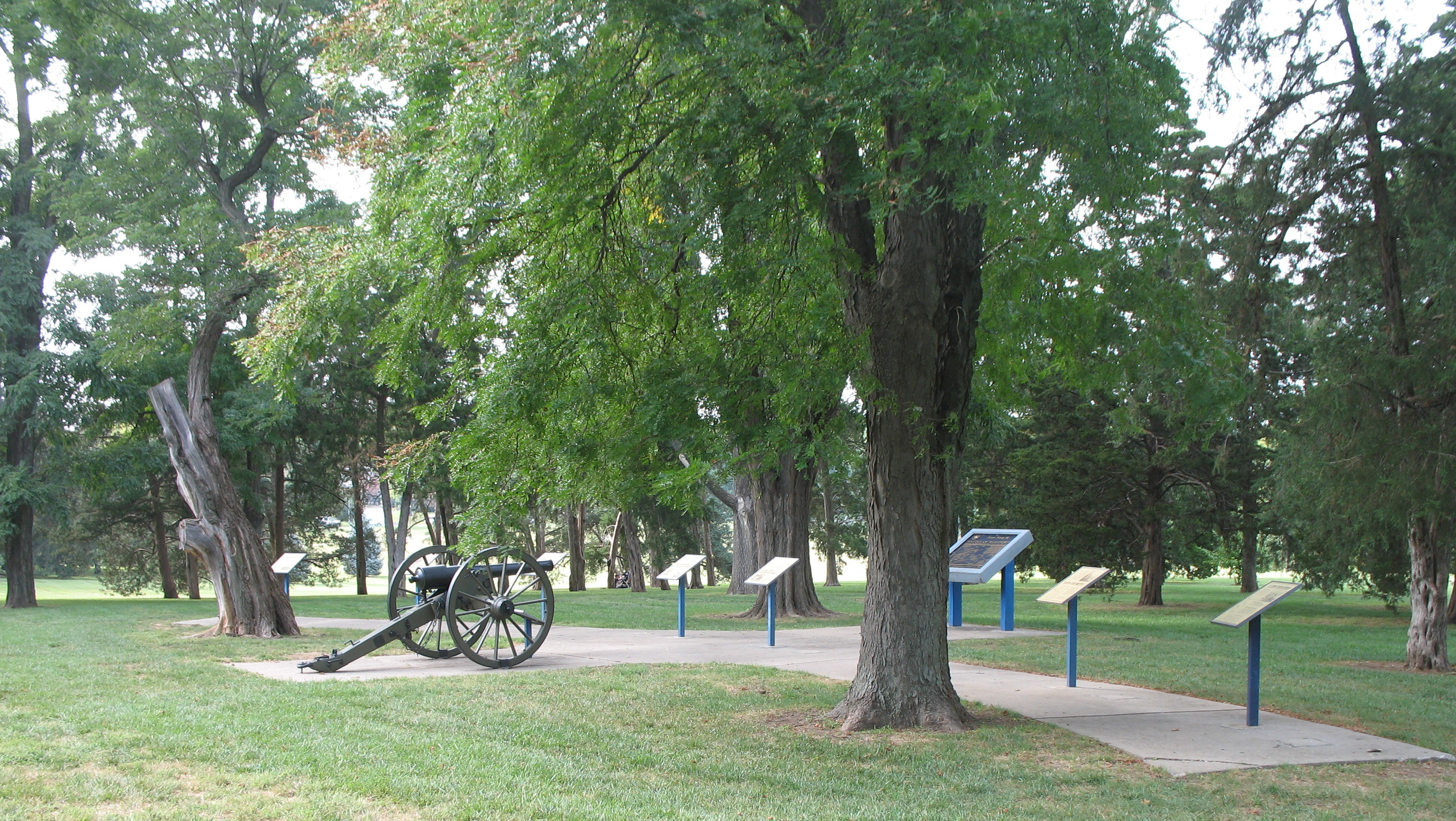
Cannon marking the spot where Sterling Price held command during the Battle of Westport

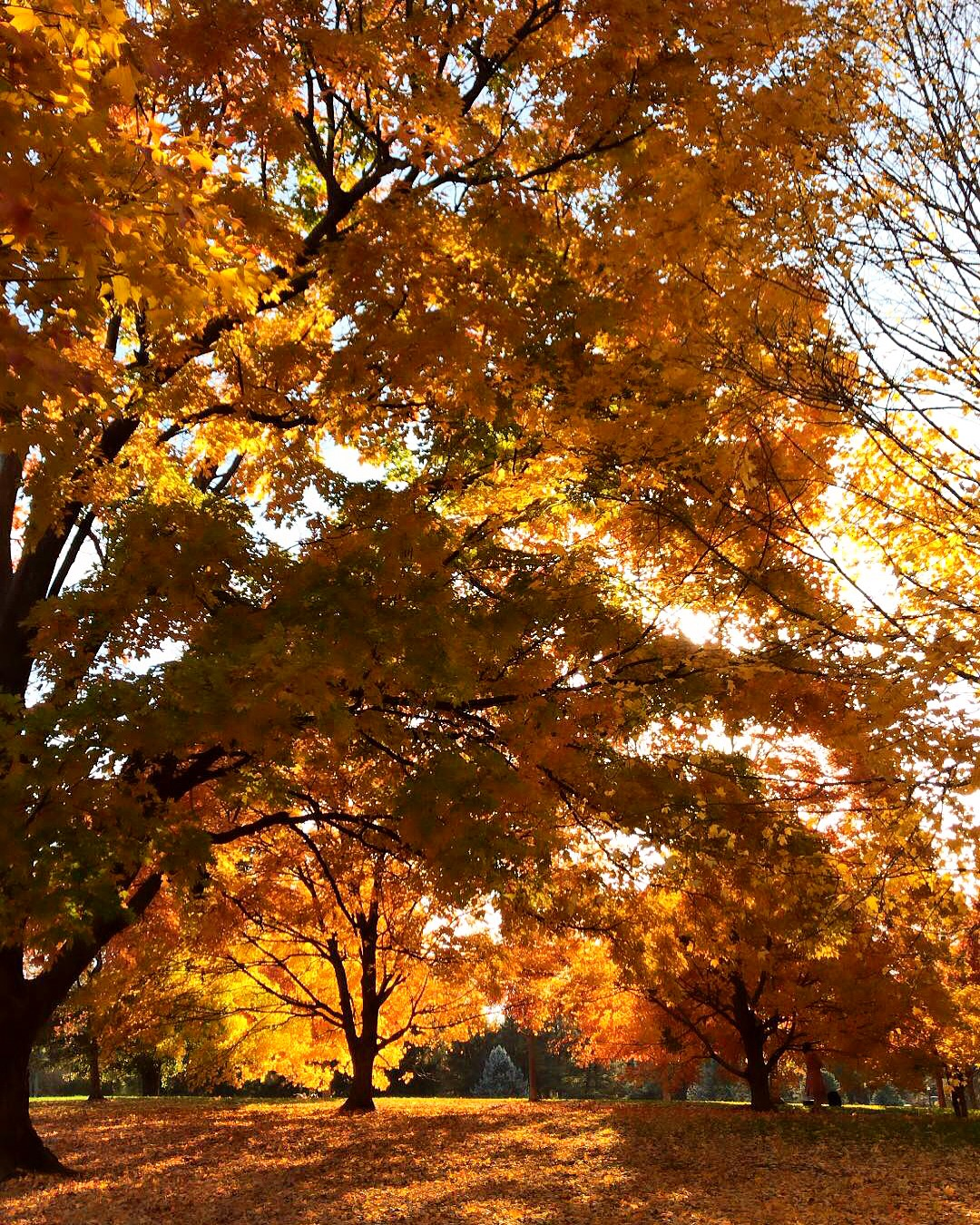
Fall foliage

Loose Park is the third largest park in Kansas City, Missouri, located at 51st Street and Wornall Road. It has a lake, a shelter house, Civil War markers, tennis courts, a water park, picnic areas, and a Rose Garden. The Rose Garden hosts all types of outdoor special events including theatrical performances and wedding ceremonies. The Japanese Tea Room and Garden is a small traditional Japanese garden conceived as a cultural exchange between the sister cities of Kurashiki, Japan and Kansas City, Missouri.

== History ==
The original pasture belonged to Kansas City pioneer Seth Ward. During the Battle of Westport in American Civil War Confederate General Sterling Price is said to have to commanded his forces from gun emplacements on what became the south end of the park.

In 1897, Ward leased the land to the Kansas City Country Club for its first golf course. In 1907 J.C. Nichols bought land around the course to form the Country Club District and Country Club Plaza. In 1925 when the golf club moved to Mission Hills, Kansas the land became a city park. In 1926, Ella Loose bought the property from the Hugh Ward estate (the son of Seth Ward) so that it could be made into a park to honor her husband, Jacob Loose. She gave the property to the city in 1927. Jacob Loose founded the Loose-Wiles Biscuit Company, which produced Sunshine Biscuits and other products.

In 1957, the Loose Park Garden Center was built at 5200 Pennsylvania Avenue for meetings and horticultural exhibitions of various kinds. The garden center has two large meeting rooms with small kitchens attached to the meeting rooms.

In 1977, international artists Christo and Jeanne-Claude selected Loose Park for their art installation concept called Wrapped Walk Ways, consisting of 135,000 sq ft (12,500 m^{2}) of orange-yellow colored shiny nylon fabric and a budget reportedly exceeding US$130,000 (equivalent to $690,692 in 2025). Mayor Charles Wheeler presented Christo with a key to the city for this brief project, which Christo described as "exquisite" and deserving of national front-page coverage.

In 1979 Neal Patterson, Cliff Illig and Paul Gorup founded the Cerner Corporation while on a picnic in the park.

In 2006, the Japanese Tea Room and Garden was dedicated as a small traditional Japanese garden. It was conceived as a cultural exchange between the Sister Cities of Kurashiki, Japan and Kansas City, Missouri.
