= Heinz Tomato Ketchup =

Brand of tomato ketchup

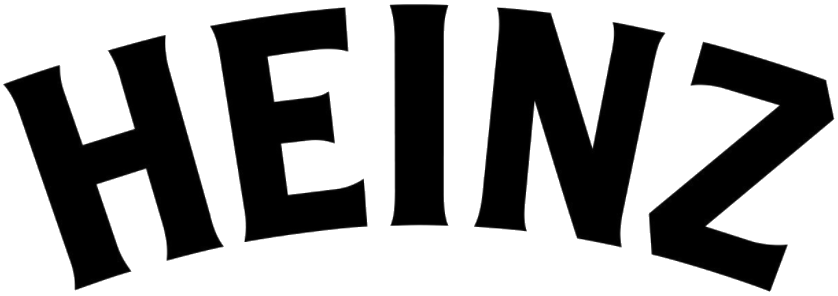

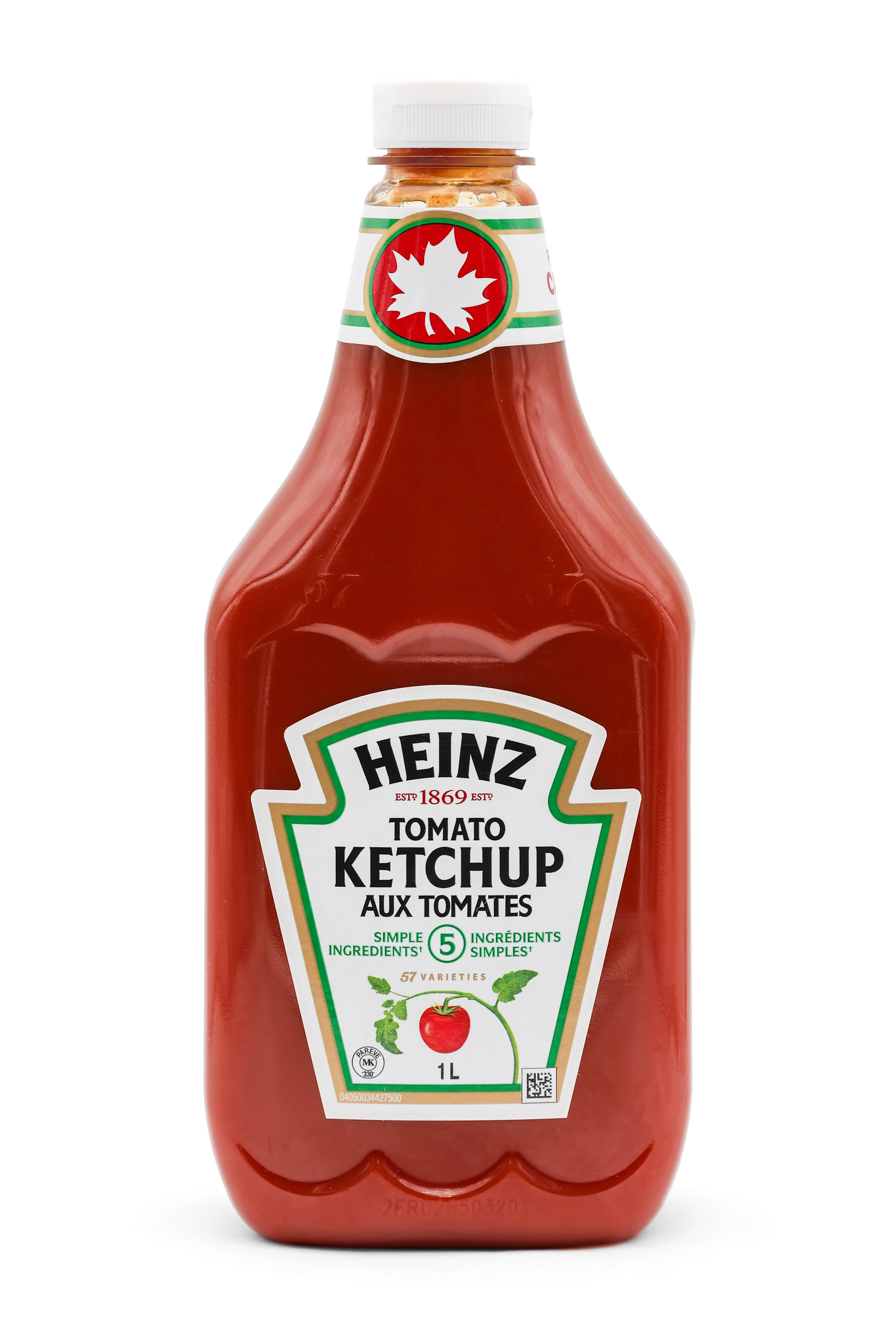
- Product type: Ketchup
- Current owner: Kraft Heinz
- Country: United States
- Introduced: 1876; 150 years ago
- Markets: Worldwide
- Previous owners: Heinz
- Tagline: It has to be Heinz
- Website: heinz.com/ketchup

Heinz Tomato Ketchup is a brand of ketchup manufactured by Heinz, a division of Kraft Heinz.

== History ==
It was first marketed as "catsup" in 1876. In 1907, manufacturing reached 12 million bottles and it was exported internationally including Australia, South America, Japan, New Zealand, South Africa and the UK. In January 2009, the label was changed by replacing the picture of a gherkin pickle (used from December 1890) with a picture of a tomato. In 2012, there were more than 650 million bottles sold worldwide.

== Manufacturing ==
Heinz manufactures all of its tomato ketchup for the American market at two plants: one in Fremont, Ohio, and the other in Muscatine, Iowa. They closed their Canadian plant in Leamington, Ontario in 2014. That plant is now owned by Highbury Canco and processes the tomatoes used in French's Tomato Ketchup for the Canadian market. Globally, Heinz manufactures ketchup in factories across the world, with their factory in the Netherlands the largest in Europe. Although there is one basic recipe for their ketchup, there are variations tailored to regional regulations, and usually depend on the country where it is manufactured.

=== Varieties ===
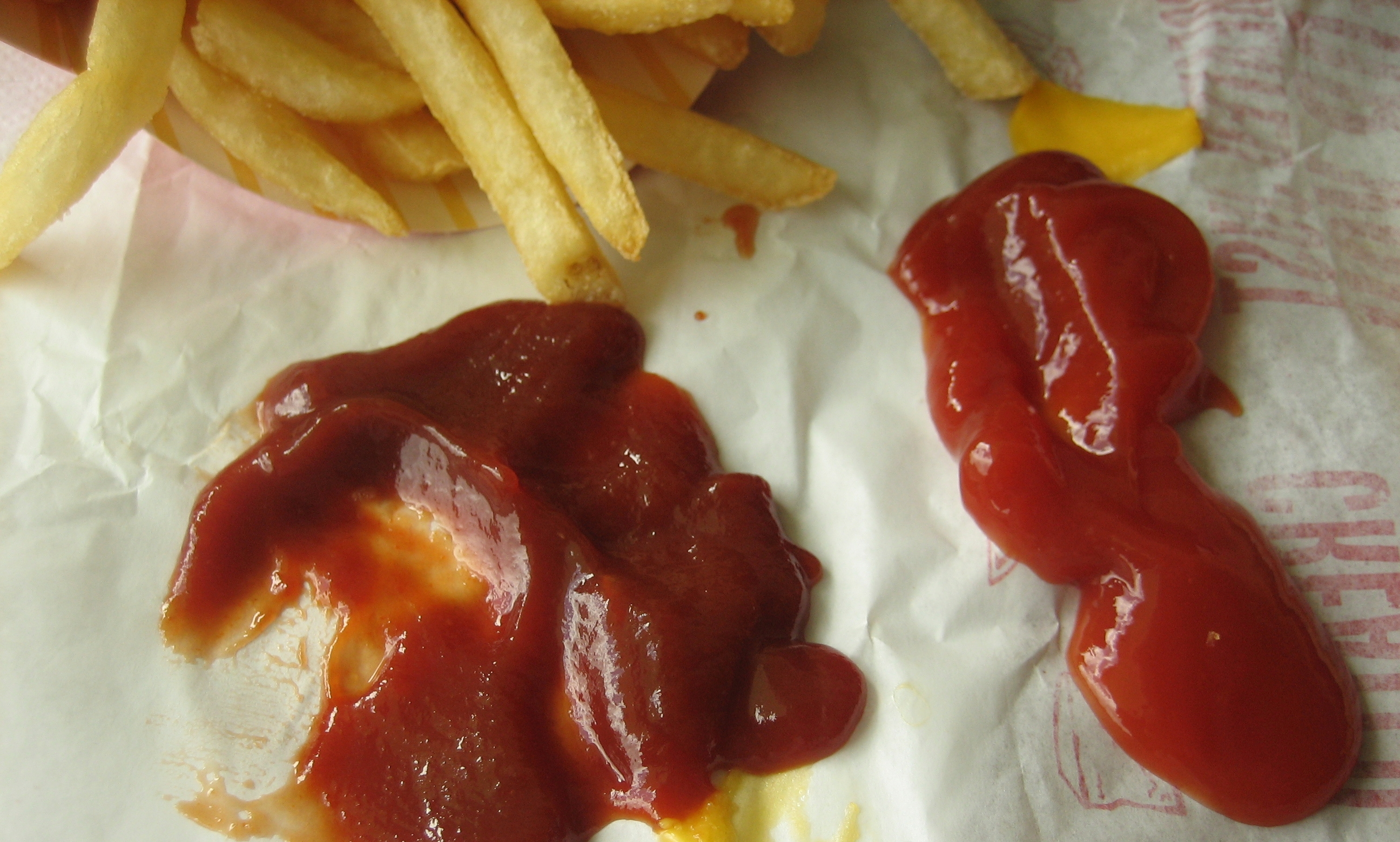
Limited Edition Heinz Tomato Ketchup blended with balsamic vinegar (left) and standard Heinz Tomato Ketchup (right)

In addition to manufacturing their regular tomato ketchup, they manufacture a variety made with sugar.

In 2000, they manufactured coloured ketchup in squeezable containers appreciated by young children. The colours were red, green, purple, pink, orange, teal, and blue. These varieties were discontinued in 2006.

In 2011 they also started manufacturing a variety with balsamic vinegar. This variety was discontinued in 2018.

On June 5, 2019 (which is National Ketchup Day), Heinz and Ed Sheeran released a limited-edition ketchup officially known as Ed Sheeran × Heinz ketchup, popularly known as "Edchup".

==== Saucy Sauce product line ====
In April 2018, Heinz announced the release of "Mayochup", a portmanteau of mayonnaise + ketchup that is a mixture of the two sauces, because more than 500,000 users voted "yes" in a Twitter poll asking Americans if they wanted to see it in stores. A number of Twitter users responded that such a mixture already existed as "fry sauce" and "fancy sauce". The sauce arrived on US retailers' shelves in September 2018. It attracted some media attention in May 2019 when the phrase was revealed to mean "shit-face" in the Cree language. Mixtures containing mayonnaise and ketchup predate the release.

In March 2019, after the success of their Mayochup campaign, Heinz announced the release of two new portmanteau products to celebrate the company's 150th anniversary: "Mayomust", from mayonnaise + mustard, and "Mayocue", from mayonnaise + barbecue sauce.

In April 2019, they released "Kranch", combining ketchup + ranch dressing. The new sauce received a mixed reception online, with Newsweek saying that it "might seem as if Kranch is a flight of fancy from a drunken frat boy" but that some consumers were nevertheless interested.

In January 2020, Heinz announced "Honeyracha" combining honey + sriracha, then in February announced "Mayoracha" combining mayonnaise + sriracha.

In March 2021, they released "Tarchup" combining tartar sauce + ketchup, "Wasabioli" combining wasabi + aioli, and "Hanch" combining hot sauce + ranch dressing. Later in March, two more sauces were announced with "Buffaranch" combining Buffalo sauce + ranch dressing and "Sweet Ketchili" combining ketchup + sweet chili sauce.

Mayoreo, a fake product based on this line of sauces, became an internet meme in June 2021.

In June 2024, Heinz released the "Every Sauce", a collector's item which contained a blend of 14 Heinz condiments. Only 100 bottles of the sauce were manufactured and given out through an online competition.

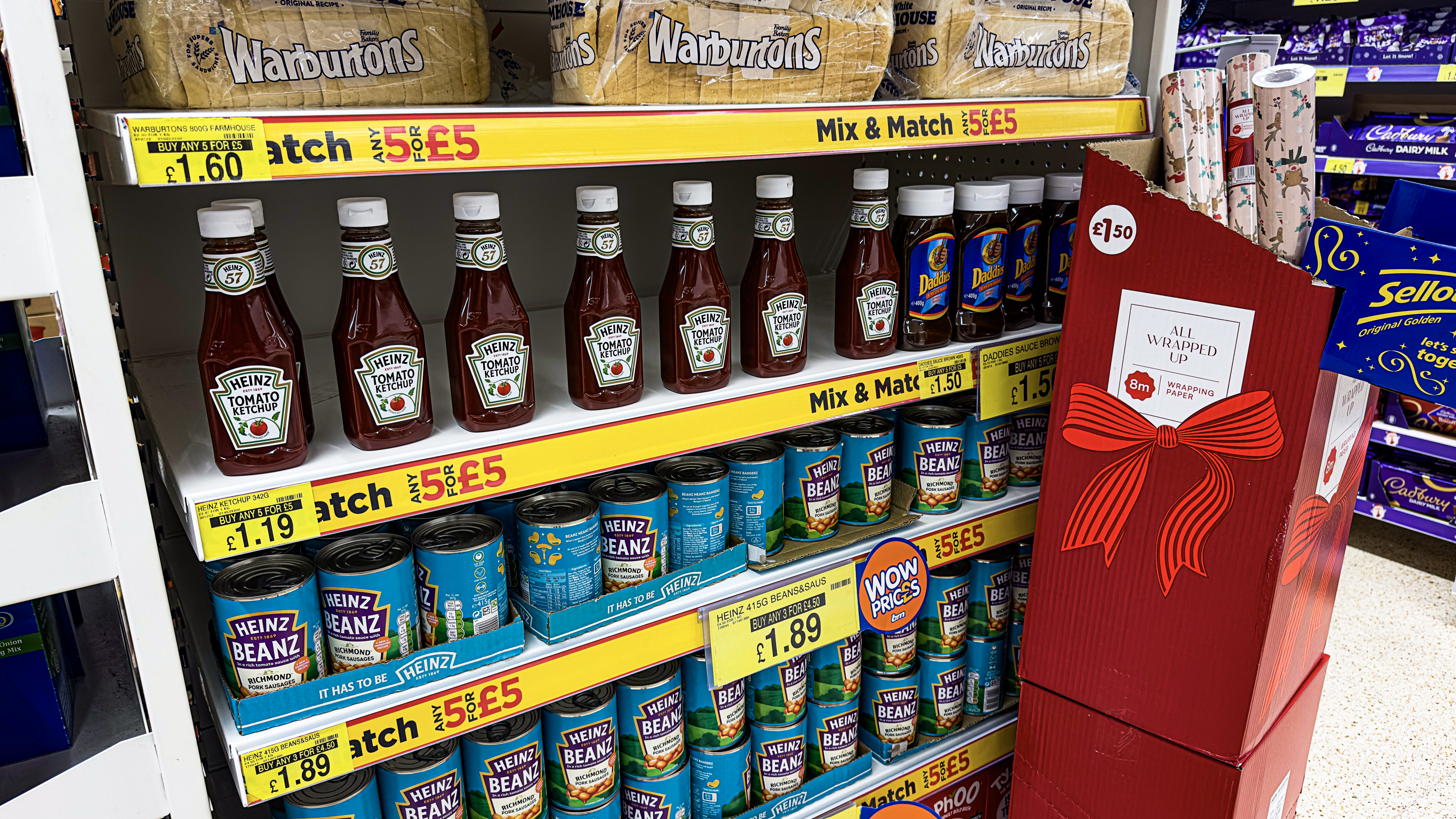
Heinz branded products display showing tomato ketchup and baked beans

=== Packaging ===
Heinz ketchup is packaged in glass and plastic bottles of various sizes. They introduced their octagonal glass bottle for the first time in 1889 and it was patented in 1890. While other glass bottle designs have existed, the octagonal glass bottle is still in use and is considered to be an iconic example of package design.

In restaurants, the glass bottle commonly used contains about 14 ounces (400 g) of ketchup. In 2002, the upside-down, squeezable plastic bottle (an opaque red bottle with a wide white cap on the bottom) was introduced for restaurants. It makes dispensing ketchup easier than from the glass bottle. The design also generates less waste as the ketchup settles down to the dispensing valve. Similarly designed squeezable bottles, in several different sizes, are available in grocery stores. It is also packaged as single serving packets made of foil and/or plastic. In 2010, Heinz introduced Dip & Squeeze, a single serving packet designed for either dipping or squeezing. A small bottle containing about 2.25 ounces (64 g) of ketchup is packaged for room service in hotels or situations where single serving packets associated with fast-food restaurants is undesirable.

Larger amounts, generally intended for the food service industry, are packaged in metal cans, rigid plastic containers, flexible plastic bags and a bag-in-box format. These larger containers can usually be fitted with pumps or placed into dispensers for self service in fast-food restaurants. A bag containing 3 US gallons (11 L) is the largest format intended for restaurants. An IBC tote containing 260 US gallons (980 L) is sold to food manufacturers.

== Counterfeiting scheme ==
In 2012, an alleged scheme to repackage regular Heinz ketchup (which contains high-fructose corn syrup) into bottles with counterfeit labels for "Simply Heinz" (which contains sugar) was discovered when the site was left unattended, after which the ketchup apparently began to ferment and the bottles exploded. At the time, according to a Heinz spokesman, they were working with the US Food and Drug Administration's Office of Criminal Investigation.

== See also ==
- Dip & Squeeze
- Heinz 57
