= Mayoreo =

Fake product image created in 2021

- Mayoreo Sauce, a fake product created in 2021
- Type: Fake product
- Inventor: Doctor Photograph
- Available: No
- Website: https://www.instagram.com/p/CQeMC0rAW20/

Mayoreo, or Mayoreo Sauce, is a fake food product image created by the Instagram account Doctor Photograph and originally posted on June 23, 2021. It was then shared on various social media platforms before being fact-checked by the website Snopes two days later. Since then, the story has been covered by a number of media outlets, including a local news station in Houston. Mayoreo is a portmanteau of mayonnaise and Oreo.

== History ==
The original Mayoreo image was posted by the Doctor Photograph account on Instagram on June 23, 2021. The image was subsequently widely shared on social media platforms such as Facebook, leading the fact-checking website Snopes to investigate it and declare it to be a fake product depicted using photo manipulation. As part of their investigation, they contacted Kraft Heinz, who stated they did not make such a product. Kraft Heinz stated that they were "intrigued" by the combination. Oreo stated that, while Mayoreo was fake, they were "always exploring new flavors and product innovations".

Since the image was released, the story has been covered by multiple media outlets, including a local Fox station in Houston. Food & Wine stated that the likely reason so many people were unsure whether to believe the product was real was due to Kraft Heinz marketing some unusual products prior to the image being released, especially those in their Saucy Sauce product line.

Doctor Photograph is known for creating fake product images and posting them to their social media accounts.
