= Domino (cookie) =

Finnish cookie brand

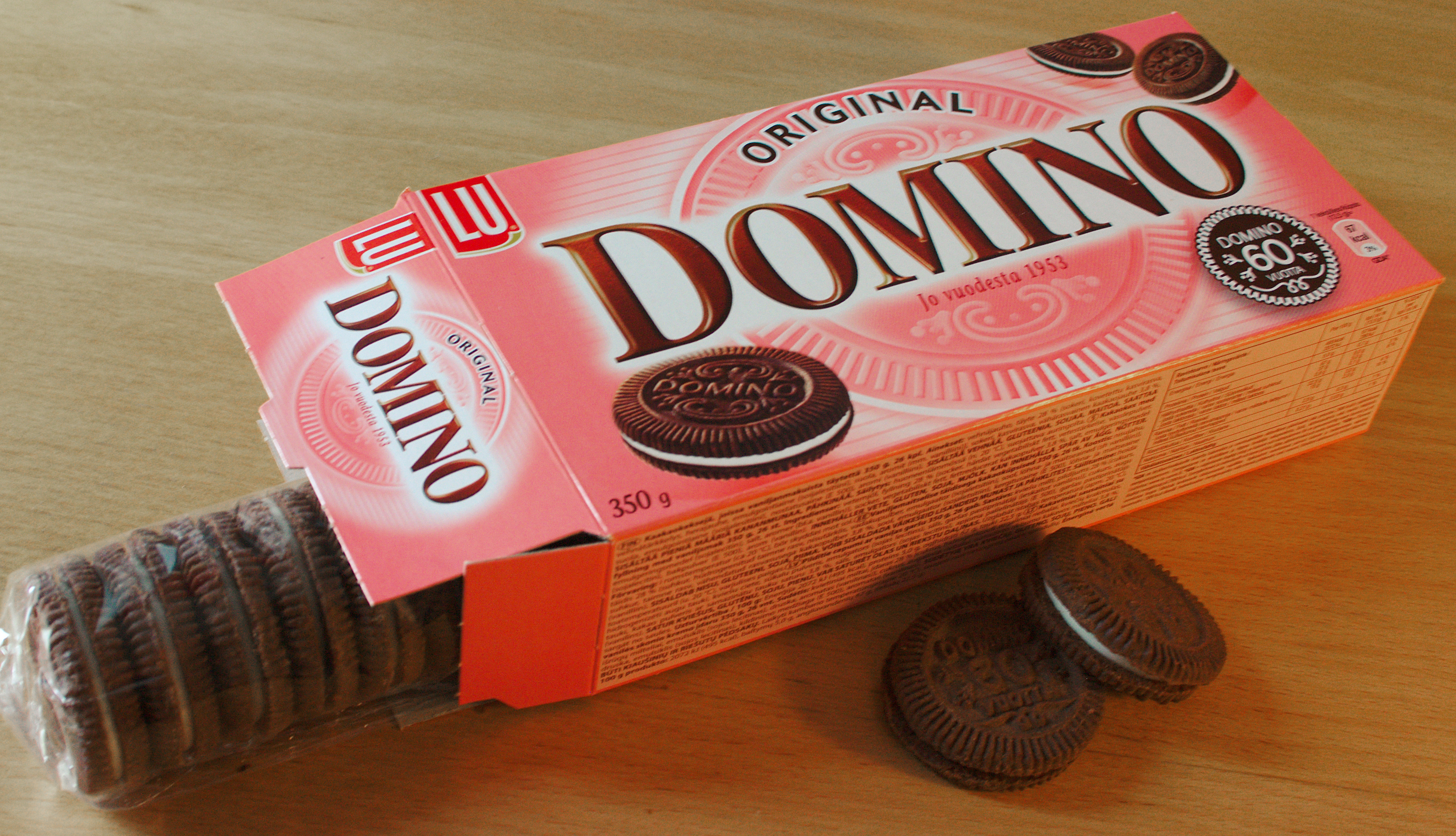
A packet of Domino cookies

Domino is a brand of cookies manufactured by the Finnish food company Fazer. Domino cookies consist of three layers, of which the upper and lower layer are made from cocoa-flavoured biscuit and the middle one is a soft vanilla-flavoured creme filling.

There are several versions of Domino cookies, such as Domino Mint, Domino Choco, Domino Double Chocolate, Mini Domino and Domino Marianne (with a peppermint flavour).

Fazer launched the Domino cookie brand in 1953. Similar cookies had existed previously in the American market, such as Hydrox launched in 1908 and Oreo launched in 1912. Between 1995 and 2016, the ownership of the Domino brand and Fazer's cookie production passed between multiple foreign owners and brands, such as United Biscuits, Danone's, Kraft Foods', and Mondelez International's LU brand. In 2016, Fazer reacquired its domestic cookie production and the associated brands.

Domino cookies are so similar to the previously invented Hydrox and Oreo cookies that some Finnish media have used them as interchangeable: The Finnish magazine Tekniikka & Talous published news about animal experiments with Oreo cookies with the headline "Domino cookies cause an addiction as bad as drugs do".

Domino has been awarded as Finland's most valued brand of cookies in the Taloustutkimus and Markkinointi & Mainonta magazines.

In 2006, Fazer launched Domino-flavoured ice cream.

== See also ==
- Oreo
- Newman-O's
- Hydrox
