= Dip & Squeeze =

Ketchup packaging

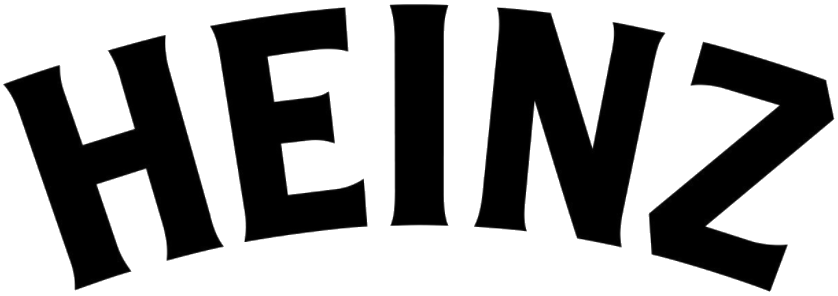

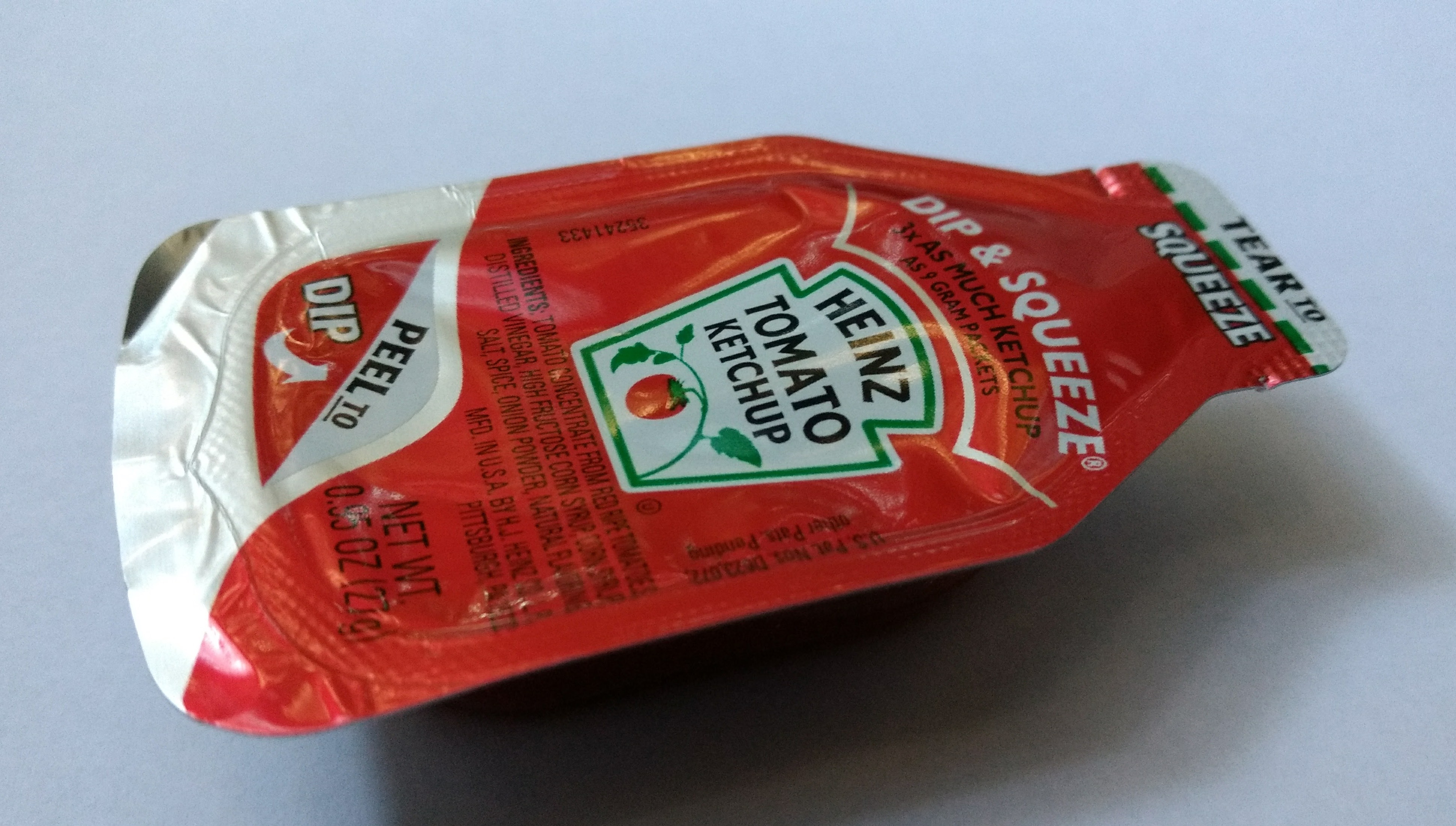
- Product type: Ketchup
- Current owner: Kraft Heinz
- Produced by: Heinz
- Introduced: 2011; 15 years ago

Dip & Squeeze is the brand name of a type of packaging for tomato ketchup used by Heinz Tomato Ketchup. The product was announced in 2010 and rolled out to consumers at U.S. fast food restaurants in March 2011. Later in 2011 it was sold directly to retail consumers at Target and Wal-Mart.

The packaging won the National Restaurant Association Food and Beverage Product Innovations Award in 2011. It won the 23rd DuPont Awards for Packaging Innovation silver award in 2011.

A laser-scored tip and plastic seal over a thermoformed tub allow a consumer to either pinch off the top and squeeze out the contents, or to rip off the seal and dip into the ketchup.

It was designed to be easier to use one-handed inside a car. Product developers watched consumers operate the traditional ketchup packet through one-way mirrors to evaluate new ketchup packaging designs. Heinz's vice president in charge of the packaging division himself bought a used minivan and tested the company's products delivered at fast food drive-up windows.

A Chick-Fil-A executive said that some consumers at the chain were hoarding the packets after they were introduced.

== Lawsuits ==
The packaging was the subject of a patent lawsuit brought by David Wawrzynski, a Detroit businessperson who claimed to have shown a similar prototype to Heinz executives in 2008. A 2012 judgment in favor of Heinz was vacated in 2014, and a jury finally found that Heinz did not owe Wawrzynski damages in April 2015.

Another suit was filed by a Chicago inventor, Scott White, in 2012.
