= Oreo =

Chocolate cookie with creme filling made by Nabisco

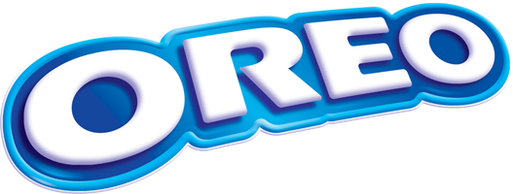

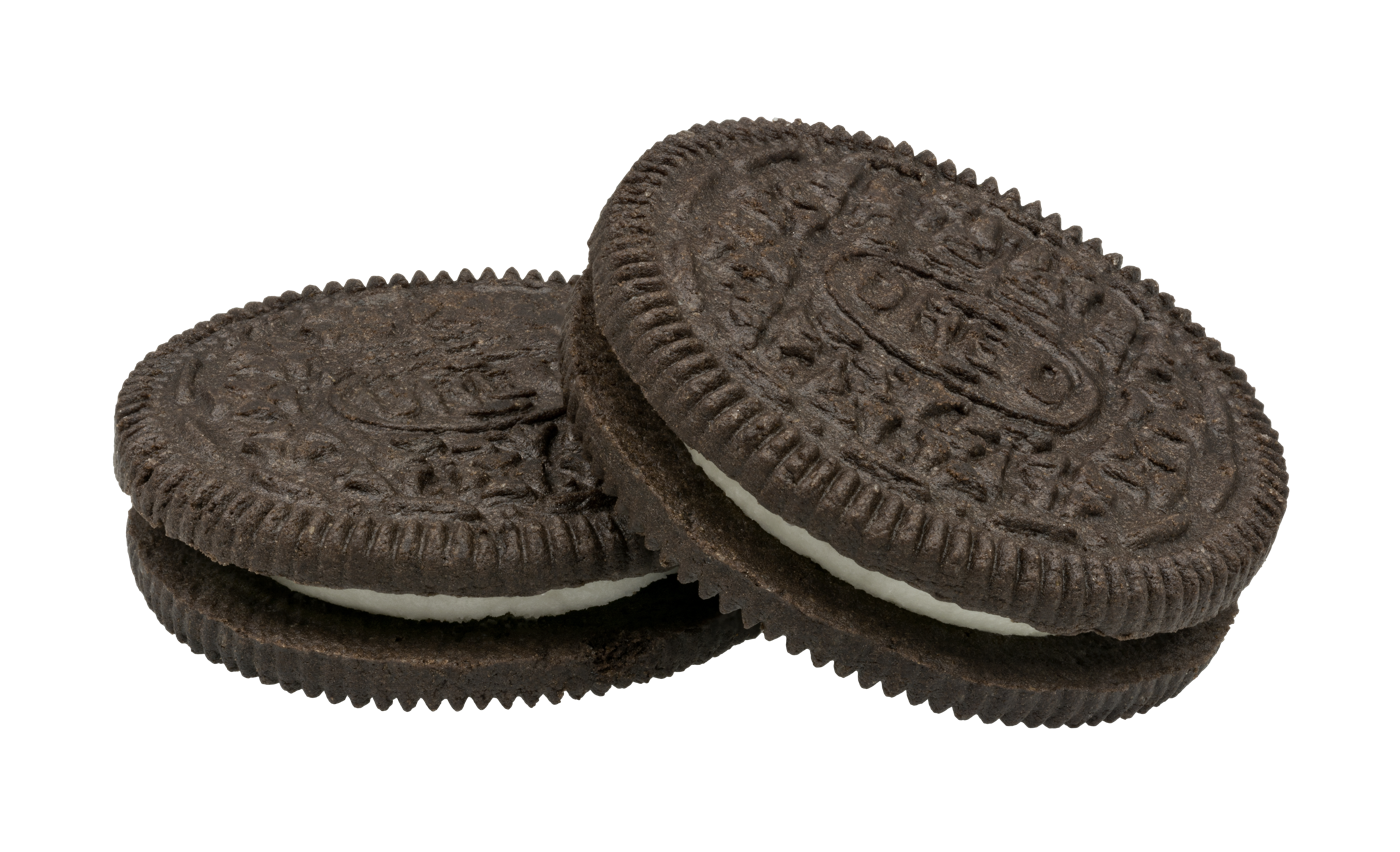
- Two Oreo cookies
- Product type: Sandwich cookie
- Current owner: Mondelez International (Note: Nabisco was a subsidiary of Kraft Foods until 2012 when the global snack division of Kraft Foods was rebranded as Mondelez International.)
- Produced by: Mondelez International; Nabisco; Cadbury; Continental Biscuits Limited
- Country: United States
- Introduced: March 6, 1912; 114 years ago
- Markets: Worldwide
- Tagline: "Wonderfilled" "Milk's favorite cookie" "Only Oreo" "Stay Playful"
- Website: www.oreo.com

Oreo (/ˈɔːrioʊ/; stylized in all caps) is an American brand of sandwich cookie consisting of two cocoa biscuits with a sweet fondant filling. Oreos were introduced in 1912 by Nabisco, and the brand has been owned by Mondelez International since its acquisition of Nabisco in 2012. Oreo cookies are available in more than 100 countries. Many varieties of Oreo cookies have been produced, and limited-edition runs have become popular in the 21st century.

Oreo cookies are an imitation of the Hydrox chocolate cream-centered cookie introduced in 1908, but they had outstripped Hydrox in popularity so largely that a majority of the general public believe Hydrox is instead an imitation of Oreo. Oreo has been the highest-selling cookie brand in the world since 2014.

== Etymology ==
The origin of the name "Oreo" is obscure, but there are many hypotheses, including derivations from the French word or, meaning "gold" (the original tin was gold-colored); the Greek word όρος (oros), meaning "mountain" (the cookie was originally conceived to be dome-shaped); or the Greek word ωραίο (oreo) meaning "nice" or "attractive". Others believe that the cookie was named Oreo simply because the name was short and easy to pronounce. Another theory, proposed by the food writer Stella Parks, is that the name derives from the Greek Oreodaphne, a genus of the laurel family, originating from the Greek words 'oreo' (ωραίο) meaning 'beautiful' and 'daphne' (δάφνη) referring to the laurel. She observes that the original design of the Oreo includes a laurel wreath, and the names of several of Nabisco's cookies at the time of the original Oreo had botanical derivations, including Avena, Lotus, and Helicon (from Heliconia).

== History ==
=== 20th century ===
Digital representation of the trademarked pattern embossed onto both faces of an Oreo cookie

The "Oreo Biscuit" was first developed and produced by the National Biscuit Company (today known as Nabisco) in early 1912 at its Chelsea, New York City factory in the present-day Chelsea Market complex, located on Ninth Avenue between 15th and 16th Streets. In 2002, this same block of Ninth Avenue was ceremonially named as "Oreo Way". The name Oreo was trademarked on March 14, 1912. It was launched as an imitation of the original Hydrox cookie manufactured by Sunshine company, which was introduced in 1908.

The original design on the face of the Oreo featured a wreath around the edge of the cookie and the name "OREO" in the center. In the United States, they were sold for $0.25 (equivalent to $8.34 in 2025) a pound (454 g) in novelty metal canisters with clear glass tops. The first Oreo was sold on March 6, 1912, to a grocer in Hoboken, New Jersey.

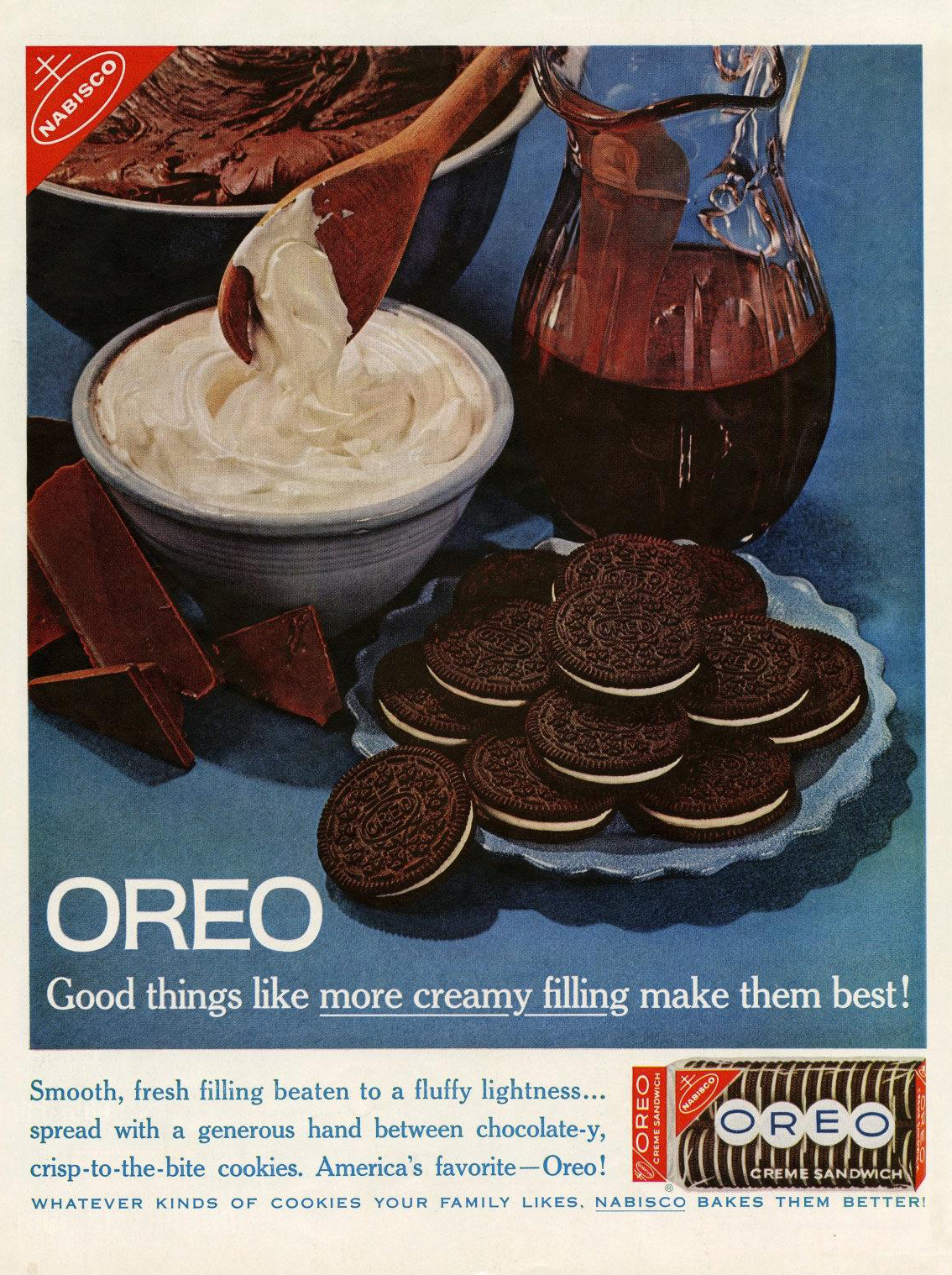
Oreo advertisement, 1961

The Oreo Biscuit was renamed in 1921 to "Oreo Sandwich"; in 1948, the name was changed to "Oreo Crème Sandwich"; and in 1974 it became the "Oreo Chocolate Sandwich Cookie", the name that has remained to this day. A new design for the face of the cookie was launched in 1924; the modern-day Oreo design was developed in 1952 by William A. Turnier, incorporating the Nabisco logo. In 1920, a second lemon crème-filled variety of the Oreo was introduced, as an alternative to the white crème-filled variety, but this was discontinued in 1924 and the original flavor was the only version available for the next several decades.

The modern Oreo cookie filling was developed by Nabisco's principal food scientist, Sam Porcello, who retired from Nabisco in 1993. Porcello held five patents directly related to his work on the Oreo; he also created a range of Oreo cookies that were covered in dark chocolate and white chocolate. In the early 1990s, health concerns prompted Nabisco to replace the lard in the crème filling with partially hydrogenated vegetable oil. This also made it possible for the bakery to become kosher-certified, a lengthy and expensive process for Nabisco. Similarly, Oreo cookies are popular with people that have certain dietary restrictions, such as vegans, as the crème filling does not use any animal products. However, there is still a risk of cross-contamination from other dairy-containing products made in the same production areas; in the FAQ section of the Oreo website, on the question of whether Oreo cookies are suitable for vegans, the response is "Many Oreo products are suitable for vegans but may include cross-contaminants of milk, so please check allergen advice."

=== 21st century ===
2012 Rainbow Oreo advertisement supporting Pride month

In January 2006, Nabisco and its parent (at the time) Kraft Foods eliminated the trans fat in the Oreo cookie and replaced it with non-hydrogenated vegetable oil as one of the main ingredients for Oreo cookies in general.

In June 2012, Oreo posted an advertisement displaying an Oreo cookie with rainbow-colored crème to celebrate LGBT Pride month; the cookie itself was fictional and was not being manufactured or made available for sale. The advertisement prompted some negative comments from conservatives, but Kraft stood by their promotion, stating that "Kraft Foods has a proud history of celebrating diversity and inclusiveness. We feel the Oreo ad is a fun reflection of our values." This was followed during 2012 by a series of adverts commemorating other holidays and events, including a blue, white, and red crème Oreo to honor Bastille Day, a stream of cookie crumbs marking the appearance of the Delta Aquariids meteor shower, and a cookie with a jagged bite taken out of it to promote Shark Week on Discovery Channel.

When the power went out during Super Bowl XLVII in 2013, the Oreo marketing team tweeted "you can still dunk in the dark" from its social media command center; this was retweeted almost 15,000 times and increased Oreo's count of Twitter, Facebook, and Instagram followers. One commentator remarked that this "solidified the viability and necessity of real-time marketing".

According to an April 2022 research report published in the journal Physics of Fluids, it was proven impossible to split the cream filling of an Oreo cookie down the middle. The filling always adheres to one side of the wafer, no matter how quickly the cookie is twisted.

== International distribution ==
Oreo cookies are distributed worldwide through a variety of sales and marketing channels. As their popularity continues to grow, so too does the amount of distribution that comes with it. According to the Kraft Foods company, the Oreo is the "World's Best Selling Cookie". In March 2012, Time magazine reported that Oreo cookies were available in more than 100 countries. In 2012 it was estimated that, since the Oreo cookie's inception in 1912, over 450 billion Oreos had been sold worldwide; just five years later, Mondelez reported that 40 billion -- nearly 10% of that 100-year quantity -- was now being produced worldwide annually.

Oreos were first introduced into Britain through the supermarket chain Sainsbury's. For several years, this was the only supermarket chain in the UK to stock the Oreo until May 2008, when Kraft decided to fully launch the Oreo across the whole of the UK. Its packaging was redesigned into the more familiar British tube design, accompanied by a £4.5M television advertising campaign based around the "twist, lick, dunk" catchphrase. In a 2020 national poll the Oreo was ranked the 16th most popular biscuit in the UK, with McVitie's chocolate digestive topping the list.

In the UK, Kraft partnered with McDonald's to introduce the Oreo McFlurry (which was already on sale in several other countries, including the US) into McDonald's locations across the country during its annual Great Tastes of America promotions; in October 2015, the Oreo McFlurry then became a permanent menu item at McDonald's in the UK. An Oreo-flavored "Krushem" drink was also on sale in KFC stores across Britain.

The ingredients of the British Oreo (as listed on the UK Oreo website) are slightly different from those of the US Oreo. Unlike the US version, the British Oreo originally contained whey powder, which was not suitable for people with lactose intolerance. Additionally, as the whey powder was sourced from cheese made with calf rennet, the British version was also unsuitable for vegetarians. On December 6, 2011, Kraft announced that production of Oreo was to start in the UK with their Cadbury Trebor Bassett factory in Sheffield, South Yorkshire, being selected to manufacture Oreo in Britain for the first time. Production began there in May 2013.

Oreo cookies were introduced onto the Indian market by Cadbury India in 2011. In Pakistan, Oreo is manufactured and sold by Continental Biscuits Limited under the LU brand. In Japan, Oreo and other Nabisco products were produced by Yamazaki Baking until Mondelez terminated their licensing deal in favor of moving production to China. A year later, Yamazaki introduced their version of Oreo, Noir, which is produced at the former Oreo factory in Ibaraki Prefecture.

== Production ==
By 2017, more than 40 billion Oreo cookies were being produced annually in 18 countries around the world. Oreo cookies for the Asian markets are manufactured in India, Indonesia, Bahrain, and China. Oreo cookies for the European market are made in Spain and at the Cadbury factory in the UK; they are made in Russia (Mondelēz Rus) for consumers in several CIS countries; and those sold in Australia are manufactured in Indonesia, China or Bahrain, depending on the flavor. The version produced in Canada (sold under the Christie's brand) included coconut oil but as of 2023, the ingredient list included vegetable oil and modified palm oil, similar to the American cookies. Manufacture of Oreo biscuits began in Pakistan in early 2014, in collaboration with Mondelez International of the United States and Continental Biscuits Limited (CBL) of Pakistan, at the CBL production plant in Sukkur.

=== Oreo boycott ===
In 2015, Mondelez announced its decision to close some of its American factories and move production to Mexico, prompting the Oreo boycott. In 2016, after production had started in Mexico, the AFL–CIO encouraged the boycott and published consumer guidance to help identify which Mondelez products were made in Mexico.

== Ingredients ==
The ingredients of Oreo cookies have remained largely unchanged from the original, although numerous alternative varieties and flavors have emerged over time. Oreo cookies were made with lard until the mid-1990s, when Nabisco swapped the animal fat with partially hydrogenated vegetable oil. In the mid-2000s, Nabisco eliminated the partially hydrogenated oil from the ingredients, due to growing health concerns. The classic Oreo cookie is made using 11 main ingredients:

1. Sugar
2. Unbleached enriched flour (wheat flour, niacin, iron, thiamine mono-nitrate (vitamin B_{1}), riboflavin (vitamin B_{2}), folic acid)
3. High oleic canola oil or palm oil
4. Cocoa (treated with alkali)
5. High-fructose corn syrup
6. Leavening agent (baking soda or monocalcium phosphate)
7. Corn starch
8. Salt
9. Soy lecithin
10. Vanillin
11. Chocolate

== Varieties ==
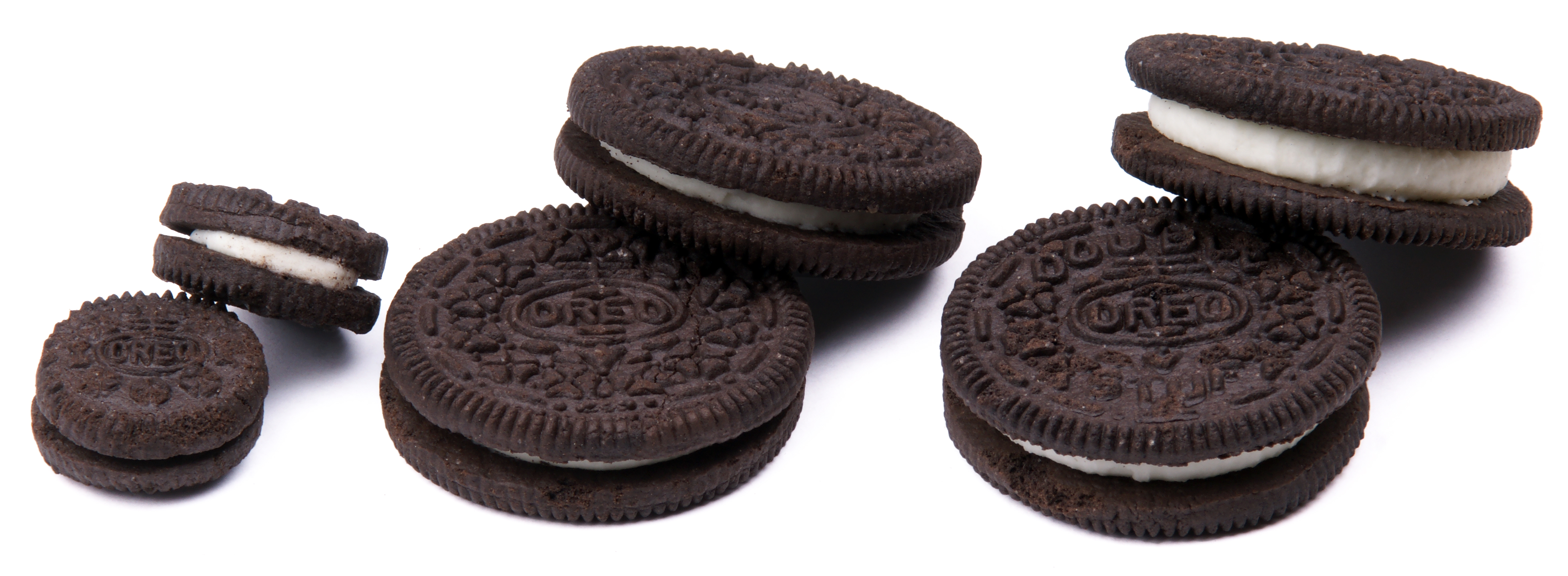
Left to right: Oreo Mini, regular Oreo, and Double Stuf Oreo

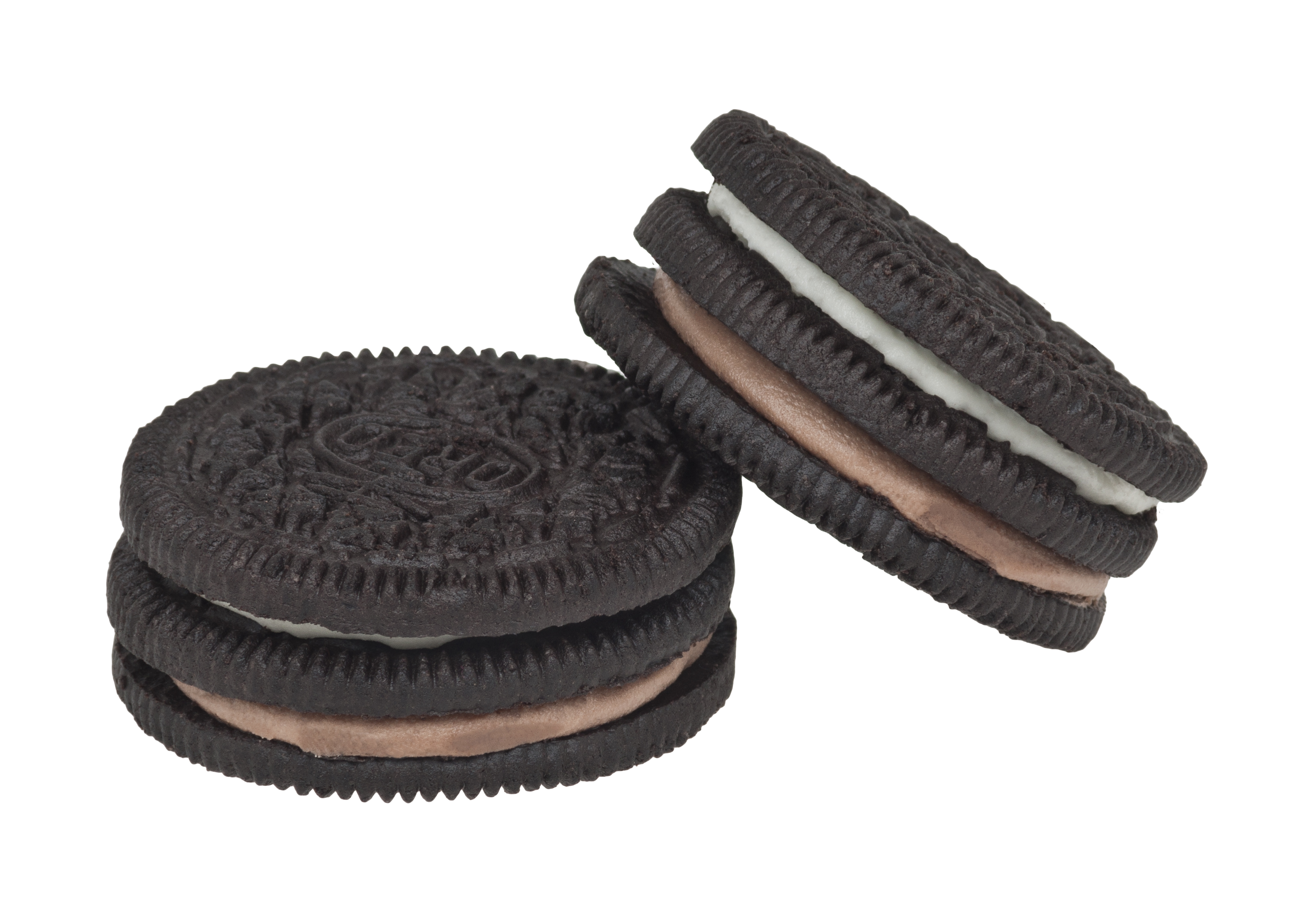
Oreo Double Triples

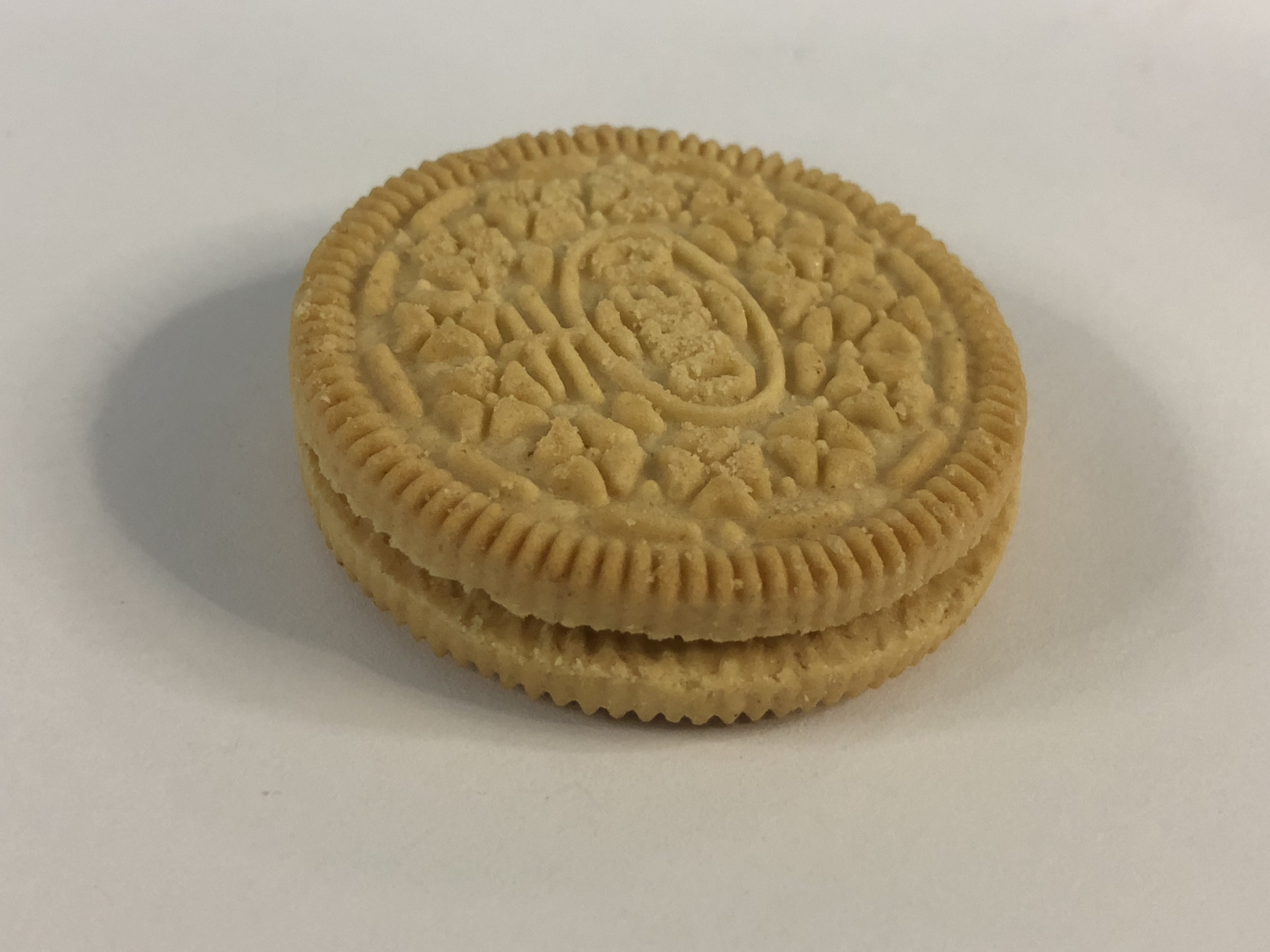
Golden Oreo

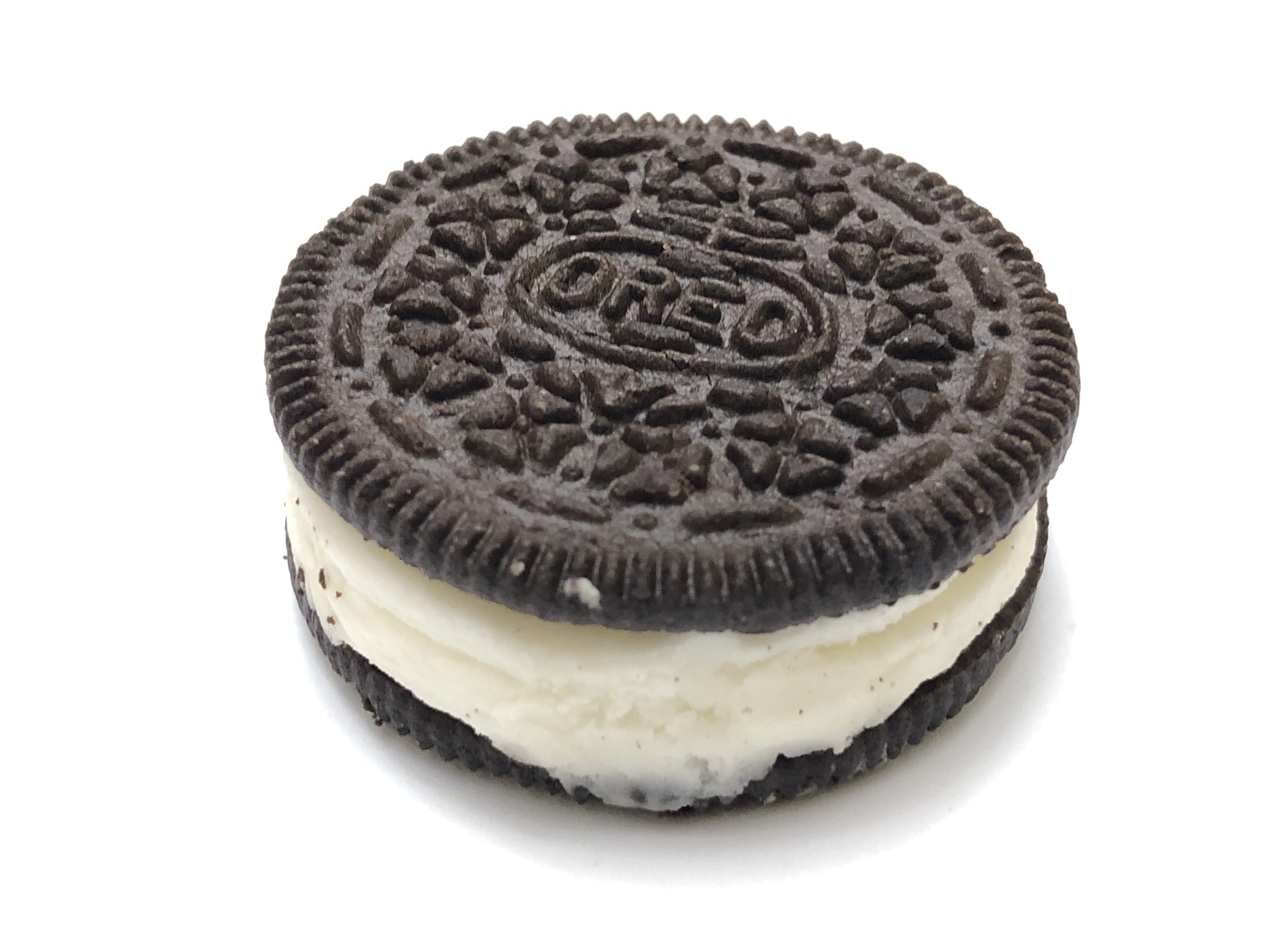
The Most Stuf Oreo

In addition to their traditional design of two chocolate wafers separated by a crème filling, Oreo cookies have been produced in a multitude of different varieties since they were first introduced. This list is only a guide to some of the more notable and popular types; not all are available in every country. The main varieties in the United States are:

- Double Stuf Oreo – Introduced in 1974, this variety has about double the normal amount of crème filling as the original. Available with various flavors of crème filling: original, chocolate, peanut butter, cool mint, and birthday cake. In the UK these are called Double Creme Oreos and are only available in original flavor. The Golden Double Stuf Oreo, featuring golden Oreo wafers with a double portion of original vanilla-flavored crème, was introduced in 2009.
- Football Oreo – Gridiron football-shaped Oreo cookies, introduced in 1976.
- Big Stuf Oreo – A short-lived variety of the Oreo cookie, introduced in 1987 but discontinued in 1991; these were several times the size of a normal Oreo. Sold individually, each Big Stuf contained 250 calories (1,000 kJ) and 13 grams of fat.
- Golden Oreo – Introduced in 2004, this has "golden" vanilla-flavored wafers on the outside of the cookie, as an alternative to the original chocolate-flavored wafers. Available with various flavors of crème filling including original, chocolate, lemon and birthday cake. The chocolate crème variety, being the reverse of the original cookie, was known as the Uh-Oh Oreo until 2007.
- Oreo Mini – Introduced in 1991, these are miniature bite-sized versions of the original Oreo cookie. After being discontinued in the late 1990s, they were re-released in 2000 along with the redesigned 2001 Dodge Caravan minivan as part of a promotional tie-in with Daimler AG. Their packaging in the 1990s consisted of a "miniaturized" version of the full-sized cardboard tray and box used in Oreo packaging at the time. Their revised packaging consists of an aluminum foil bag. Oreo Minis are available with various flavors of crème filling including original, chocolate, strawberry, and the new mint flavor which debuted in 2015. As well as the bagged version, they are also sold in Nabisco To-Go Cups, lidded plastic cups which fit into car cup-holders.
- Oreo Cakesters – Introduced in 2007, Oreo Cakesters are Oreo's version of a whoopie pie, soft chocolate snack cakes with vanilla, chocolate or peanut butter creme in the middle. They were discontinued in 2012. They returned in 2022 after a petition was started to have them brought back. The same year, Nabisco announced that Cakesters would be making a return in 2022, including Oreo and Nutter Butter varieties.
- Mega Stuf Oreo – Released in February 2013, the Mega Stuf variety is similar to Double Stuf, but with even more white crème filling. They come in both chocolate and golden wafer varieties.
- Oreo Thins – Introduced in July 2015, this is a thin version of the original Oreo cookie. Thins come in both chocolate and golden wafer varieties, with various crème flavors including chocolate, mint, lemon and tiramisu. Each cookie contains only 40 calories; they are 66% thinner than the original version.
- Chocolate Oreo – An Oreo cookie with chocolate crème filling.
- Mint Oreo – A variety of Oreo with two chocolate wafers separated by a mint-flavored crème filling.
- The Most Stuf – Introduced in January 2019, an initially limited edition Oreo with approximately four times the amount of crème filling of a standard Oreo. After two limited runs, it was quietly brought back as a permanent product in late 2020. While they were first offered in traditional Oreo packages and widely available when they were limited edition, the permanent version is only found in individual four-packs as well as 12 four-pack collections within convenience store settings.
- Gluten Free – Introduced in January 2021, available in both traditional and Double Stuf varieties

Special edition Double Stuf Oreo cookies are produced during springtime, and around Halloween and Christmas. These have colored frosting reflecting the current holiday: blue or yellow for springtime; orange for Halloween; and red or green for the Christmas holiday. One side of each seasonal cookie is stamped with an appropriate design; the spring cookies feature flowers, butterflies, etc., while the Halloween editions feature a jack o'lantern, ghost, cat, flock of bats, or broom-riding witch. The 2017 Halloween Oreo broke with this tradition, having orange-colored crème filling (albeit with classic vanilla flavor) but carrying no seasonal designs.

In some countries, Oreos come in a variety of flavors that are not familiar to the U.S. market. For example, Green Tea Oreos are only available in China and Japan, while Lemon Ice Oreos were only ever introduced in Japan or Blueberry Ice Cream available in China, Indonesia, Malaysia, Singapore, Thailand and Vietnam. Additionally, there are alfajor Oreo cookies available in Argentina, composed of three Oreo cookies with vanilla filling between each, and covered in chocolate.

=== Limited editions ===
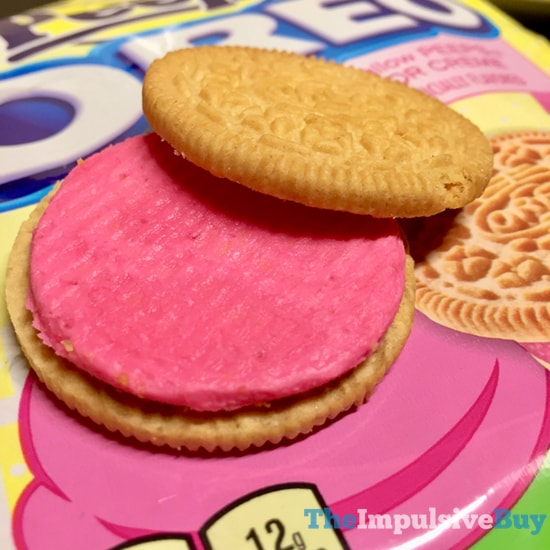
Peeps Oreo limited edition

Beginning in the early 2010s, Nabisco began releasing limited edition runs of cookies with more exotic flavors. These typically appear in stores for a short period only, before being discontinued, although some varieties have since resurfaced, for example: Reese's Oreos returned for a second limited run after they were first introduced for a limited period in 2014; and Birthday Cake Oreos, originally introduced in 2012, have since become permanently available. Some limited editions are only made available at certain retailers.

Limited-edition runs usually feature a crème filling that has been flavored to replicate the taste of a specific fruit or dessert, from familiar flavors such as lemon or mint, to the more specific and unusual flavors of blueberry pie or red velvet cake. They may also incorporate different varieties of cookie wafer, for example Cinnamon-Bun Oreos featured cinnamon-flavored wafers and "frosting-flavored crème". In recent years, some limited editions have paired Oreos with other recognizable confectionery brands, including Reese's, Swedish Fish, and Peeps.

Oreo's six-person team in charge of special flavors is extremely secretive; the company will not disclose even the group's name. The limited-edition flavors largely serve as advertising for Oreo's regular varieties.

List of limited edition Oreo flavors
Name	Release	Description
Birthday Cake	February 2012 – July 2012	Created to celebrate Oreo's 100th birthday. Made up of two chocolate Oreo cookie wafers with a birthday cake–flavored crème filling and sprinkles inside. On one of the two wafers, the traditional design was replaced with a birthday candle and the words "OREO 100". The birthday cake flavor has since been reintroduced, with a "double stuf" amount of crème filling, in both chocolate and golden Oreo varieties, except that the cookies no longer display the "OREO 100" print. Now permanently available.
Lemon Twist	2012–2013	A golden Oreo with a lemon-flavored crème filling.
Watermelon	Summer 2013	A golden Oreo with watermelon-flavored crème filling. Largely unsuccessful.
Strawberries n' Cream	2013	A golden Oreo with a crème filling consisting of two halves, one strawberry-flavored and one similar to traditional Oreo crème.
Fruit Punch	2014	A golden Oreo with fruit punch-flavored crème.
Cookie Dough	March 2014	A chocolate Oreo with cookie dough–flavored crème filling.
Root Beer Float	July 2014	A golden Oreo filled with root beer–flavored crème.
Pumpkin Spice	September 2014	A golden Oreo with pumpkin spice–flavored crème filling.
Red Velvet	February 2015	First released in February 2015, and since reintroduced. Two red Oreo cookie wafers with cream cheese-flavored crème filling. Designed to emulate the popular red velvet cake. Also available in Indonesia.
Key Lime Pie	July 2015	Two graham-flavored Oreo cookie wafers filled with key lime-flavored crème filling.
Cinnamon Bun	January 2016	Two cinnamon-flavored cookie wafers filled with frosting-flavored crème filling. Designed to emulate a cinnamon bun.
S'mores	Summer 2016	Two graham-flavored cookie wafers with a double layer of crème filling, one layer chocolate-flavored and one layer marshmallow-flavored. Inspired by the traditional campfire snack.
Fruity Crisp	June 2016	A golden Oreo with a fruity and colorful rice crisp crème filling, similar to Fruity Pebbles.
Blueberry Pie	June 2016; 2017	Two graham-flavored cookie wafers with a blueberry-flavored crème filling.
Swedish Fish	August 2016	A chocolate Oreo with a red crème filling, flavored to resemble the red-colored Swedish Fish candy. Originally released exclusively through Kroger stores in the United States.
Peeps	February 2017; February 2018	Originally released for Easter 2017. A golden Oreo filled with pink "marshmallow Peeps"–flavored crème. Second version, released in February 2018, made with Peeps-embossed chocolate Oreo cookie wafers and purple "marshmallow Peeps"–flavored crème filling.
Waffle and Syrup	May 2017	A golden Oreo with a ring of vanilla crème filling and a blob of maple syrup–flavored crème in the center. Exclusive to Albertsons stores in the United States.
Chocolate Hazelnut	January 2018	A golden Oreo with a "Nutella-like"-flavored crème filling. Released January 1, 2018.
Salted Caramel	2018	A golden Oreo with a salted caramel flavor crème filling.
Firework		Two classic Oreo cookie wafers with Pop Rocks candy within the crème. Released around the Fourth of July in the United States.
Peppermint Bark	October 2018	Two classic Oreo cookie wafers with "double stuf" amount of peppermint-flavored crème with red sugar crystals.
Easter Egg	January 2019	A chocolate Oreo in an oval shape to resemble an egg, with purple-colored crème filling and four Easter-related designs on the wafer: a bunny in a basket, a baby chick wearing bunny ears, and spots and stripes to resemble the painting of an Easter egg.
Chocolate Marshmallow	January 2020	Includes marshmallow pieces in the cookie wafers and chocolate marshmallow crème filling.
Caramel Coconut	January 2020	Caramel crème filling with coconut flavor and coconut pieces.
Supreme	March 2020	Double-stuf Oreos branded by Supreme.
Oreo Thing Prints	1996	Two classic Oreo cookie wafers with the top wafer displaying one of ten designs featuring the Nabisco Thing, the company mascot from 1995 to 2000.
Lady Gaga	January 2020	Salmon-colored cookie wafers with malachite-green filling; same flavor as a golden Oreo. Released to promote Lady Gaga's album Chromatica (2020).
Strawberry Frosted Donut	March 2021	A golden Oreo with two layers of crème filling, made up of one layer of glittery pink strawberry-flavored crème and one layer of donut-flavored crème.
Hot Chicken Wing		Exclusive to China.
Wasabi		Exclusive to China.
Crispy Tiramisù		
Carrot Cake		
Jelly Donut		
Mississippi Mud Pie		
Piña Colada		Oreo Thins.
Banana Split		
Peanut Butter and Jelly		
Mystery		Churro-flavored.
Team USA	2020	A chocolate Oreo with three layers ("Triple-Stuf") of filling, colored red, white, and blue. Released to promote the United States Olympic Team.
Mint		
Reese's	2014	
The Most Stuf	2019	Regular Oreos with four times the amount of crème filling.
Triple Double Chocolate Mint		A chocolate Oreo with chocolate and mint crème filling.
Android		Green crème filling. Promotional flavor with Google.
Coconut Delight		Regular Oreos with coconut crème filling. Exclusive to Indonesia.
Strawberry Milkshake		Strawberry crème filling. First introduced in Canada; later released in the United States.
Strawberry		Available in Chile, Indonesia, Malaysia, the Philippines, and Singapore.
Green Tea		Available in China and Japan.
Lemon Ice		Exclusive to Japan.
Orange Ice Cream	2011	Available in Indonesia, Malaysia, Singapore, and Thailand.
Oreo DQ Blizzard Creme	April 2010	Promoted the 25th anniversary of the Dairy Queen Blizzard.
Oreo Trio Chocolate		Exclusive to Mexico.
Oreo Pokémon	2021 (US); 2024 (Asia)	Promotion for the Pokémon franchise. One side of the wafer has one of sixteen Pokémon, including Pikachu and the rare Mew. Introduced in 2021 in the United States and 2024 in Asia.
Neapolitan	2022	Waffle cone flavored cookies with vanilla, strawberry and chocolate triple-layered crème filling; reminiscent of Neapolitan ice cream.
Oreo Batman	2022	Promotion for 2022 film The Batman. Has a Batman face on the wafer. Available in Europe, Canada, Mexico, and Australia.
Oreo Blackpink	2022–2023	Pink-colored cookie wafers with dark chocolate crème filling. A special package is available with an exclusive photo card. Promotion for the Korean girl group Blackpink. First available in Indonesia; later in the Philippines, Thailand, Malaysia, Singapore, Vietnam, and South Korea.
The Most Oreo Oreo	2023	Crème filling contains small bits of Oreo cookie wafer.
Oreo Cajeta Coronado	May 2024	Exclusive to Mexico.
Oreo Coca-Cola	September 9, 2024	Part of a campaign with Coca-Cola, which made its own Oreo-flavored Coca-Cola product to match.
Post Malone Oreo Cookies	January 2025	
Selena Gomez Oreo Cookies	2025	This collaborative campaign introduced Selena Gomez's Signature Chocolate and Cinnamon Creme OREO Cookies, which included an exclusive remix of her song I Can't Get Enough that could be listened to when scanning the OREO cookies with her signature on them.
BTS Brown Sugar Pancake	June 2026	The collaboration product with BTS featuring exclusive engravings on the cookies as well as Hotteok cream filling. Additionally, fans can send their own love letters for a chance to win the product on the website.

== Advertising campaigns ==
=== You Can Still Dunk in the Dark ===
When the lights went out during Super Bowl XLVII in 2013, Oreo immediately parodied the event on social media with a "You Can Still Dunk in the Dark" post. The post earned 15,000 retweets and 20,000 Facebook likes in an hour.

=== Oreo Daily Twist ===
Oreo Daily was a social media campaign celebrating Oreo's 100th birthday. Every day, from June 25 to October 2, Oreo posted ads of their cookies transformed into something new to celebrate national holidays, pop culture milestone, and key moments in American history. Using reinvented Oreo cookies, ads in the campaign honored the Mars rover landing, Elvis week, the invention of Pac-Man, and the release of The Dark Knight in theaters.

=== Dunk Challenge ===
In 2017, NBA player Shaquille O'Neal starred in an Oreo commercial to promote their #OreoDunkSweepstakes. In the ad, O'Neal can be seen performing an acrobatic slam dunk of an Oreo cookie into a glass of milk. Fans could show off their own dunking abilities for the chance to win prizes.

=== Global Oreo Vault ===
In October 2020, Nabisco announced on social media that it had created a small concrete bunker in Svalbard, Norway to preserve the Oreo recipe in the extremely unlikely event that the 2018 VP1 asteroid impacted the Earth on November 2 or 3, 2020. The image of the vault was based on the Svalbard Global Seed Vault, and its supposed coordinates were placed near the seed vault. The vault supposedly contained Oreos wrapped in Mylar, powdered milk and the recipe for Oreo cookies. The campaign was inspired by a tweet posted on October 3, 2020. The company uploaded a series of scripted parody videos about the vault to YouTube, and released social media content that built up to a mockumentary about the vault's creation. The stunt was created by the Oreo marketing team and advertising agencies 360i and The Community.

The campaign was nominated for and received several awards for advertisements and online content. It was nominated for a 2020 Clio Award, and 2021 Webby Award, and won a 2021 Muse Award, Shorty Award, and Cresta Award. The campaign also won Adweek's Reader's Choice bracket for marketing events of the year.

=== Reese's Collaboration ===
A Reese's Oreo Cup was created based on the friendship of Angel Reese and Paige Bueckers, who are partnered with Reese's and Oreo respectively.

== Use of the word "Oreo" as a slur ==
Oreo cookies, due to their almost-black cookies and white filling, have often been used in popular culture as a metaphor for relations between African Americans and White Americans.

=== Applied to a single person ===
The term "Oreo" has occasionally been used as a racial slur aimed at a person of mixed-race or African-American heritage who is accused of trying to act white. The insult may be levied as an accusation that the person perpetuates the "un-level playing field for blacks", and is based on the implication that the person is like the cookie, "black on the outside and white on the inside". For example, the protagonist of the 1974 novel, Oreo, was nicknamed Oreo because of a mixed Jewish-American and African-American heritage. Former American president Barack Obama, due to his biracial heritage, has been compared to an Oreo by political pundits and television personalities such as John McLaughlin and Rush Limbaugh.

In 2021, the chair of the Lamar County Democrats, Gary O'Connor, compared South Carolina Senator Tim Scott, the only African-American Republican in the United States Senate, to an Oreo after Scott gave the Republican response to Joe Biden's joint address to Congress. Amid fierce criticism, O'Connor apologized for his remarks and offered his resignation. However, the Lamar County Democrats chose not to accept his resignation and O'Connor wrote a public letter of apology for his remarks.

=== Applied to three people ===
In the 1976 movie A Star Is Born, Barbra Streisand's character Esther Hoffman is the white central member of The Oreos, a three-girl singing group, between black actresses Venetta Fields and Clydie King.

== See also ==
- Cookies and cream
- Hydrox
- Domino (cookie)
- Mayoreo, a fake product based on the Heinz Saucy Sauces product line
