= Railroad Workers United =

American labor organization

- Founded: November 2007
- Location: North America
- Key people: Ron Kaminkow
- Affiliations: Railroad union reformers
- Website: www.railroadworkersunited.org

Railroad Workers United (RWU) - which grew out of the group Railroad Operating Crafts United (ROCU) is a cross-union rail workers’ reform group that was started as a result of a push by workers from the United Transportation Union and the Brotherhood of Locomotive Engineers and Trainmen to merge unions. They are now a cross-craft organization that supports all non-management railroad workers. RWU has a steering committee - currently (2024) of 11 Members and 5 Alternates, all of whom are working railroaders from various crafts and rail unions. Members are elected at their bi-annual convention, usually held in the spring of even numbered years, generally in Chicago, a major railroad center.

The organization's membership is open to any railroad worker, working in the United States of America, Mexico, or Canada and who are not supervisory personnel or managers.

The official RWU slogan is "Solidarity - Unity - Democracy." The organization engages in a variety of Campaigns that are popular with rail workers, and has adopted numerous Resolutions on various questions of concern to railroaders.

There are different railroad workers unions in North America. Some unions are separated based on their craft of work. Railroad workers in North America are not required to be unionized. Thirteen unions are in the United States of America.

== Campaigns ==
RWU is credited with starting the 'No Single Employee Crews' campaign. Calls for two-person train crews were in response to the major railroad carriers who filed a lawsuit in U.S. district court, in which they claimed that their proposal to reduce train crew size was a negotiable issue, and that previous moratoriums on one-man operations should not stand in the way of their alleged right to negotiate crew size reduction nationally. The railroad carriers claimed that the conflict over the issue is a "minor dispute" under the Railway Labor Act, they sought to have it subject to arbitration.

During the third week of November 2019 over 3,000 of the Canadian workers were on strike in Canada. Strikers included train operators and yard workers at Canadian National Railway. They walked out after negotiators failed to reach an agreement by their preset deadline. Workers have been without a contract since July, and were protesting long shifts and allegedly dangerous working conditions.

Following Congress's intervention in the 2022 United States railroad labor dispute, RWU announced their support for the public ownership of United States railroads, citing the railroads' high profits during the coronavirus pandemic, which had been used for shareholder appeasement and stock buybacks as opposed to infrastructure or labor investments. They accuse the railroad of a multitude of anti-labor practices, as well as contributing to the 2021–2022 global supply chain crisis due to price gouging and the use of precision scheduled railroading. Arguments in favor of Nationalization include the period of increased efficiency during the nationalization of American railways in World War I, as well as union opposition to re-privatization following the war's end.
