= Sunshine Biscuits =

Defunct American snack company

Sunshine Biscuits, Inc.

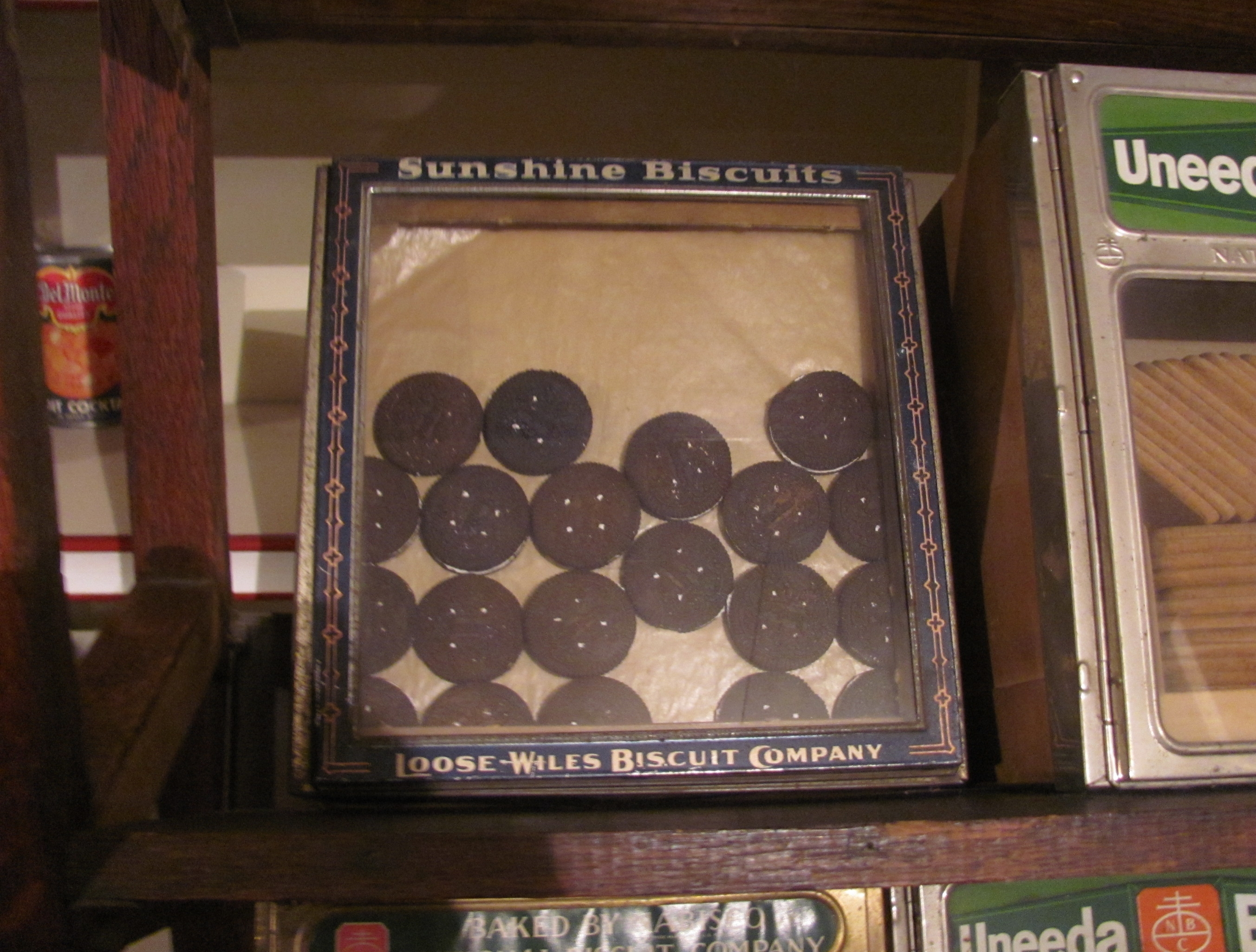
- Sunshine Biscuits at Strawbery Banke in Portsmouth, New Hampshire
- Type: Public
- Industry: Food processing
- Founded: Kansas City, Missouri (1902; 124 years ago, as Loose-Wiles Biscuit Company)
- Founders: Joseph Loose; Jacob Loose; John H. Wiles
- Defunct: 1996; 30 years ago
- Fate: Acquired
- Successor: Keebler/Kellogg's
- Headquarters: Elmhurst, Illinois, U.S.
- Area served: Nationwide
- Products: Snacks
- Parent: Keebler Company

Sunshine Biscuits, formerly known as The Loose-Wiles Biscuit Company, was an independent American baker of cookies, crackers, and cereals. The company, which became a brand on a few products such as Cheez-It, was purchased by the Keebler Company in 1996, which was purchased by the Kellogg Company in 2001. Around then, Sunshine Biscuits was headquartered in Elmhurst, Illinois, where Keebler was located until 2001.

At the time of its purchase by Keebler, Sunshine Biscuits was the third-largest cookie baker in the United States.

== History ==
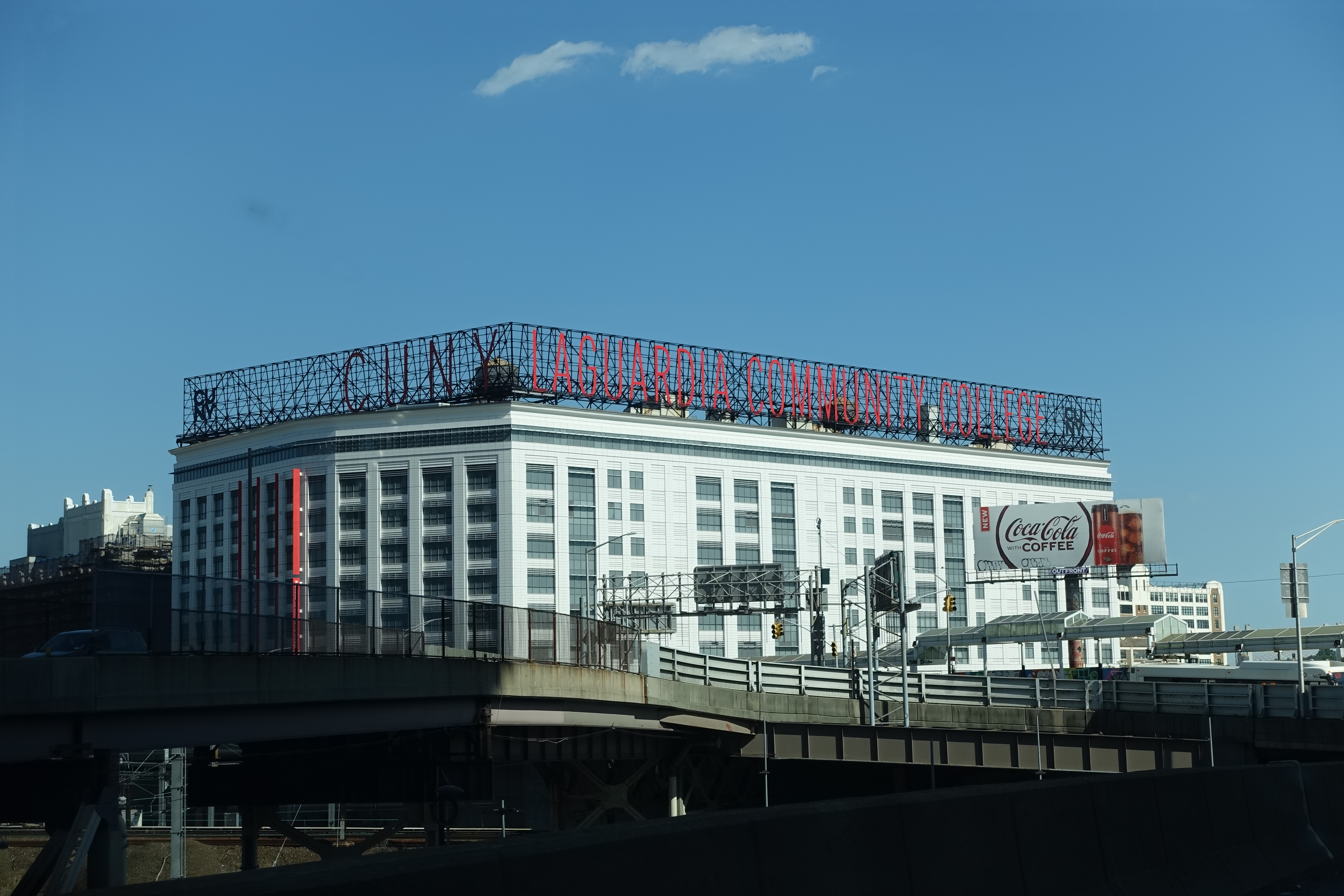
The former "Thousand Window" bakery became part of LaGuardia Community College.

Sunshine Biscuits
- Current owner: Kellogg Company (Keebler Company)
- Country: United States
- Introduced: 1902; 124 years ago
- Related brands: Keebler
- Markets: Nationwide

Until the late 19th century, the biscuit and cracker industry was made up of small independent local bakeries preparing products and selling them in bulk. The barrels and crates of biscuits were delivered by horse and wagon, set out in the grocery store and sold to the consumer by the measure.

In 1890, a group of 33 Midwest and Western bakers combined to form the American Biscuit & Manufacturing Company. This was to compete with United States Baking Company, another Midwest group, and the New York Biscuit Company, an East Coast conglomerate. Soon the American Biscuit and New York Biscuit groups were opening bakeries and lowering prices in each other's area in an attempt to eliminate the competition. Finally in February 1898, the competing groups combined 114 factories and formed the National Biscuit Company (Nabisco).

Joseph Loose was a member of Nabisco's Board of Directors, and in 1902, he, his brother Jacob Loose, and John H. Wiles liquidated their holdings in National Biscuit Company and formed the Loose-Wiles Biscuit Company in Kansas City, Missouri. They envisioned a factory filled with sunlight and so they adopted the name Sunshine. Soon they began expanding and opened new plants in Boston and then New York City. In 1912 Loose-Wiles opened its "Thousand Window" bakery in the Long Island City neighborhood of New York City, which remained the largest bakery building in the world until 1955. The plant was closed in 1965 and the production was moved to Sayreville, New Jersey.

Loose-Wiles never registered its Sunshine brand name and therefore spent much effort in the first forty years trying to dissuade other companies from using the word "sunshine" or any related word on their product or in their advertising. Since Loose-Wiles' claim was not based on a registered mark, they often had to investigate when and where the other company first used the word to determine which company had first claim so as not to lose their right to the name "Sunshine" for their own products. Finally in 1946, the Loose-Wiles Company officially changed its name to Sunshine Biscuit, Inc.

The early part of the company's history was dominated by developing new items and acquiring established brands from other smaller companies. Many of the products and their names are similar to those of their largest competitor, the National Biscuit Company. For example, Nabisco's first individually packaged cracker was named Uneeda. Loose-Wile's cracker was "Takhoma". Loose-Wiles made "Trumps Cookies". Nabisco produced "Aces". Sunshine Biscuit had "Animal Crackers" and "Toy Cookies". Nabisco produced "Barnum's Animals".

The American Tobacco Company purchased the company in 1966. It was then sold to G. F. Industries, a privately held California company, and merged with the Keebler Company in 1996.

== Products ==
Sunshine Biscuits made the Hydrox chocolate sandwich cream cookie, before it was discontinued in 1999. They were reintroduced in 2015, and are now made by Leaf Brands. Sunshine is best known as the brand name of Cheez-It snack crackers. However, six well-known Sunshine products were discontinued after the merger with Keebler: Chip-A-Roos, Chocolate Nugget cookies, Chocolate Fudge Cookies, Lemon Coolers, Golden Raisin Biscuits (through 1996, similar to Garibaldi biscuits), and Golden Fruit Biscuits. Sunshine originated Vienna Fingers cookies, which were eventually branded as Keebler.

Current products are Cheez-It snack crackers, Krispy saltine crackers, Krispy Soup & Oyster crackers, and Nut Sundae Cookie.

Former products include Hydrox chocolate sandwich cookies, sold to Leaf Brands in 2014; Lemon Coolers cookies, trademarked by Texan Foods LLC in 2016; Yum Yums coconut caramel cookies, trademarked by Texan Foods LLC in 2016; Hi Ho Crackers, trademarked by Texan Foods LLC in 2016; and Sunshine Nut Sundaes marshmallow cookies.

They made a snack cracker line called American Heritage, Cherry Coolers, Fig Bars (not Fig Newtons), and International Snacks, a line of sandwich cookies with two flavors of creme in every cookie. Shredded Wheat was produced at the Sayreville, New Jersey, facility and distributed only east of the Mississippi.

After Kellogg's took over Keebler, including crackers bearing the Sunshine name, the Sunshine brand was replaced by Kellogg's. Texan Foods LLC now has the trademark for Sunshine Biscuits.
