= Hydrox =

Brand of sandwich cookies

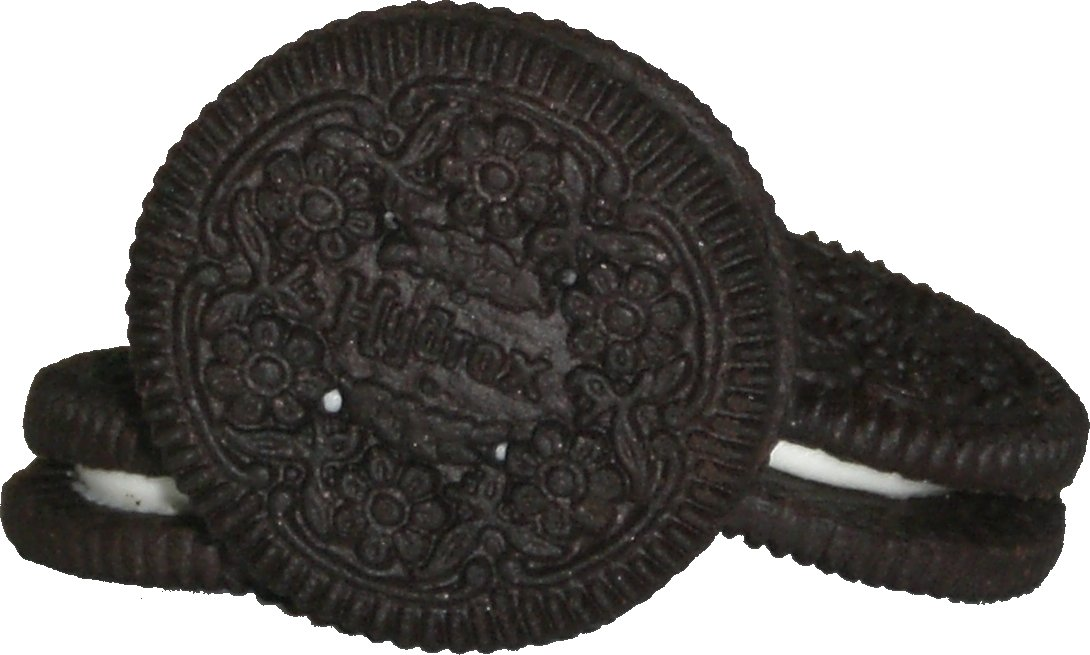
- Product type: Sandwich cookie
- Current owner: Leaf Brands (2014–present)
- Country: United States
- Introduced: 1908; 118 years ago 2015; 11 years ago (reintroduced)
- Discontinued: 1999; 27 years ago
- Related brands: Leaf Brands
- Previous owners: Sunshine Biscuits (1908–1996); Keebler (1996–2001); Kellogg Company (2001–2014)
- Website: leafbrands.com

Hydrox is a creme-filled chocolate sandwich cookie currently owned and manufactured by Leaf Brands. It debuted in the United States in 1908, and was manufactured by Sunshine Biscuits for over 90 years. Hydrox was largely discontinued in 1999, three years after Sunshine was acquired by Keebler, which was later acquired by Kellogg's; which in turn sold the cookie line and the rights to the Keebler name to Ferrero SpA. In September 2015, the product was reintroduced by Leaf Brands.

Oreo was created in 1912 as an imitation of Hydrox, but eventually surpassed it in popularity. This resulted in the belief of the opposite being the case: Hydrox cookies being perceived by many as an imitation of Oreo. Compared to Oreos, Hydrox cookies have a less sweet filling and a crunchier cookie shell that is less soggy when dipped in milk.

== History ==
In 1908, the cookie's creation was inspired by "purity and goodness", with a name derived from the hydrogen and oxygen elements within the water molecule.

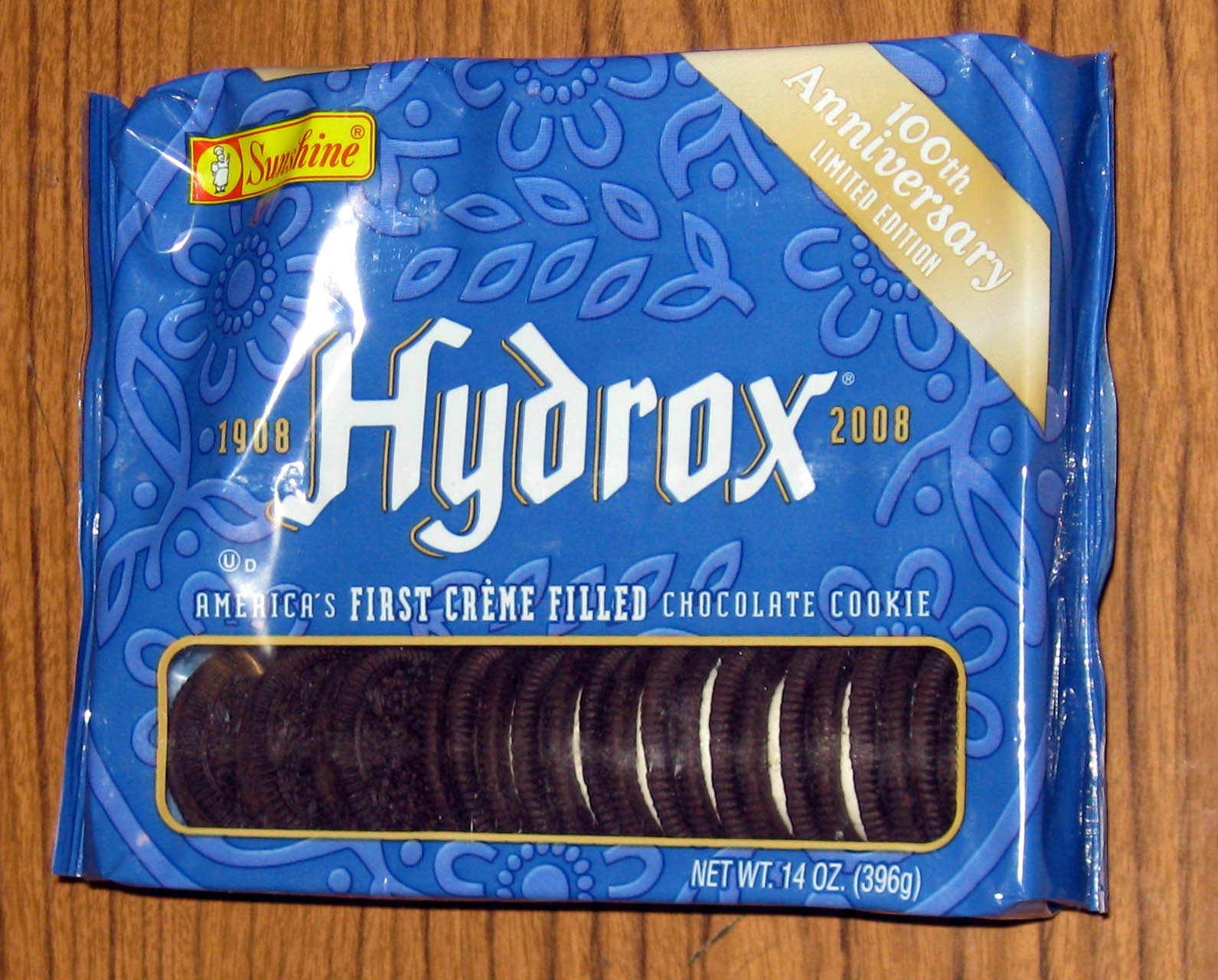
"Centennial" package of Hydrox cookies with the Sunshine label

Sunshine Biscuits was purchased by Keebler in 1996. In 1999, Keebler replaced Hydrox with a similar but reformulated product called "Droxies". Keebler was acquired by Kellogg's in 2001, and Kellogg's removed Droxies from the market in 2003. Kellogg's then marketed a similar chocolate sandwich cookie under the Famous Amos brand, along with sandwich cookies of other flavors; they discontinued the line.

On the cookie's 100th anniversary, Kellogg's resumed distribution of Hydrox under the Sunshine label in late August 2008. This was in direct response to 1,300 phone calls from fans as well as an online petition with 1,000 signatures, a Hydrox fan website with the essay "Nonconformists don't eat Oreos", and dozens of forum posts, asking that production resume. The cookies were available nationally for a limited time; less than one year later, Kellogg's removed Hydrox from their web site.

The Carvel ice cream franchise sold ice-cream goods manufactured with Hydrox cookie crumbs until 2012. Carvel, which mainly operated in areas with significant Jewish populations, used the cookie's all-kosher status as a selling point, because the original Oreo recipe used lard. The cookies were not specifically mentioned by name on the Carvel website, but they were identified as "hydrox" [sic] on the in-store posters. Carvel currently uses Oreo cookies in its ice cream goods.

In 2014, Leaf Brands registered the "Hydrox" trademark, which had been abandoned by former owner Kellogg's. Leaf began production of its version of Hydrox on September 4, 2015, at the company’s facility in Vernon, California. In 2017, the recipe was changed to remove artificial flavors that had been used for 50 years and the company obtained non-GMO certification.

Leaf Brands filed a complaint with the U.S. Federal Trade Commission in 2018 against Mondelēz International, maker of Oreo cookies, for hiding Hydrox cookies from customers on store shelves.

== See also ==
- Newman-O's
- Domino (cookie)
- Oreo
