= List of Mondelez International brands =

This is a list of brands developed, owned, or licensed by Mondelez International (formerly Kraft Foods Inc.), including its division Nabisco. The company's core businesses are snack foods and confectionery. Kraft-branded products are made for some international territories by Mondelez International under license from Kraft Heinz Company since 2012.

== Current brands ==
List of current brands:

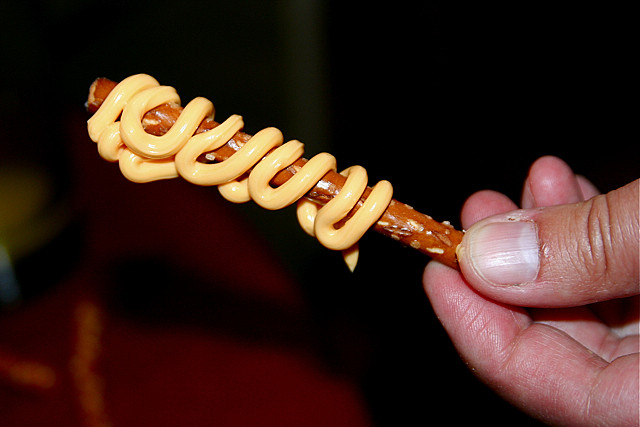
Easy Cheese on a pretzel

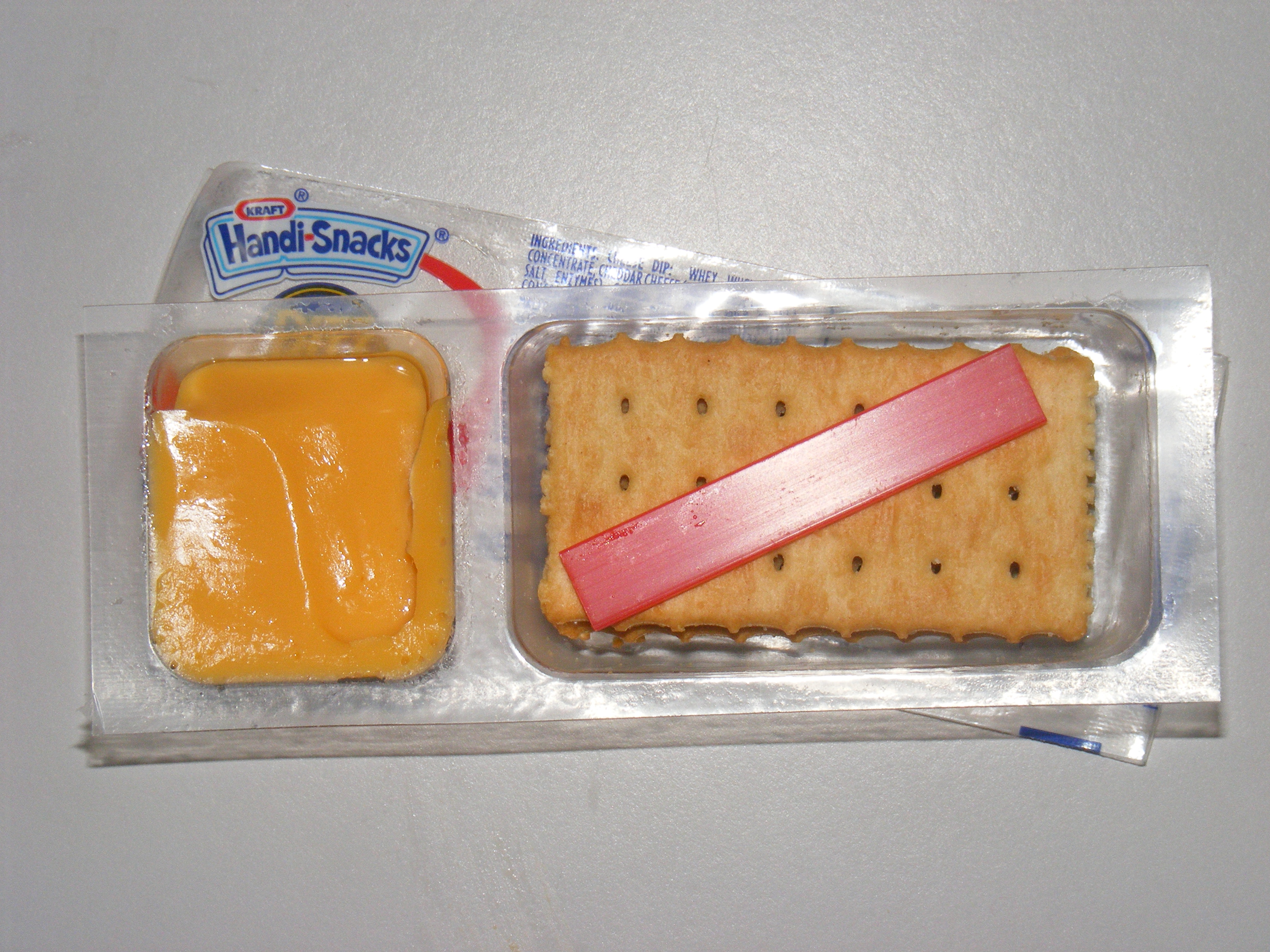
Ritz "Crackers'n Cheez" Handi-Snacks

- 5 Star
- 7DAYS
- Alpen Gold
- Barny
- Belvita
- Bournvita
- Cadbury
- Cadbury Dairy Milk
- Cheez Whiz (Philippines)
- Chips Ahoy!
- Clif
- Clight
- Clorets
- Club Social
- Côte d'Or
- Daim
- Dairylea (UK and Ireland)
- Easy Cheese
- Eden (Philippines)
- Enjoy Life Foods
- Field (Peru)
- Fontaneda
- Freia
- Grenade
- Halls
- Honey Maid
- Hu
- Jacob's (Malaysia)
- Kinh Do (Vietnam)
- Lacta (Brazil)
- Lacta (Greece)
- Lorna Doone
- LU
- Marabou
- Maynards Bassetts
- Mikado (under license from Ezaki Glico)
- Milka
- Nussbeisser
- Nutter Butter
- Opavia (Czechia)
- Oreo
- Perfect Snacks
- Philadelphia Cream Cheese (under license from Kraft Heinz Company outside North America)
- Prince
- Prince Polo
- Ricolino (Mexico)
- Ritz
- Royal
- Sorbeticos (Venezuela)
- Sour Patch Kids
- Stride
- Swedish Fish
- Tang (sold by Kraft Heinz Company in North America)
- Tate's Bake Shop
- Teddy Grahams
- Terrabusi (Argentina)
- Tiger
- Toblerone
- Trakinas (Brazil)
- Triscuit
- TUC
- Twisties (as Fonzies in some countries, under license from Frito-Lay)
- Wheat Thins

== Former brands ==
- Back to Nature - sold to B&G Foods in 2017
- Bubblicious, Dentyne, Trident, and Chiclets sold to Perfetti van Melle in 2023
- Philadelphia To Go Bagel & Cream Cheese – a former bagel and cream cheese convenience food product that was introduced by Kraft Foods in 2003.
- Planters

== Former brands table ==
Key:	Kraft Foods/Mondelez Brand	Defunct	Sold to others

Name	Area	Market	Year acquired	Year Disposed	Status	Notes
Altoids	Confectionery (mints)	United States		2005	Sold to Wm. Wrigley Jr. Company	
Bird's Custard	Dairy (Custard)	North America, United Kingdom, Ireland		2004	Sold to Premier Foods	
Bird's Eye	Frozen foods	North America		2004	Sold to Dean Foods	Now owned by Pinnacle Foods
Boboli	Baked Goods	North America		1995	Sold to Bestfoods	Canadian rights owned by George Weston Limited; U.S. rights owned by Grupo Bimbo
Breyers	Dairy (ice cream)	North America		1993	Sold to Unilever	Oreo ice cream remains Kraft brand made by Breyers
Breyers	Dairy (yogurt)	North America		1993	Sold to CoolBrands International	
Budget Gourmet	Frozen foods	North America		1994	Sold to H.J. Heinz	Part of Bellisio Foods under the Michelina's brand
California Pizza Kitchen (grocery)	Frozen foods (Pizza)		2000	2009	Sold to Nestle	
Caramel and marshmallow business	Confectionery	North America	2000		Reacquired by Kraft as part of Nabisco purchase in 2000	Sold to Texas Pacific Group in 1995
Celestial Seasonings	Tea	North America	1984	1988	Sold to original owners	Attempted sale to Lipton broke US anti-trust laws
Cheddarie	Dairy (cheese spread)	North America, United Kingdom, Ireland			Discontinued	
Cheese Pot	Dairy (cheese spread)	North America			Discontinued	
Chiffon	Margarine	North America		1995	Sold to Nabisco Brands, Inc.	Nabisco's butter substitution business was sold to ConAgra Foods in 1999
Cracker Barrel	Dairy (cheese)	Canada		2018	Sold to Parmalat Canada	
Cream of Wheat; Cream of Rice	Breakfast cereal	North America		2007	Sold to B&G Foods	
Del Monte	Canned food	Global		2005	Sold to CanGro	Including Aylmer, Coronation and other grocery products in Canada
DiGiorno	Frozen foods (Pizza)			2010	Sold to Nestle	
Entenmann's	Baked Goods	North America		1995	Sold to Bestfoods	Owned by Grupo Bimbo
Farley's & Sathers	Confectionery	North America		2002	Sold out as independent	
Free Choice	Mayonnaise, salad cream	United Kingdom, Ireland			Discontinued	
Freihofers	Baked Goods	North America		1995	Sold to Bestfoods	Owned by Grupo Bimbo
Fruit2O	Beverage	North America		2007	Sold to Sunny Delight	
Frusen Gladje	Dairy (ice cream)	North America		1993	Sold to Unilever	
Golden Crown	Margarine	United Kingdom			Discontinued	
Koogle	Peanut butter	North America			Discontinued	
Kraft Eating Right	frozen entrees	North America			Discontinued	
Kraft Foodservice	Foodservice	Global		1995	Sold to Clayton, Dubilier and Rice Inc.	
Kraft Ramek	Cream cheese	Italy, Middle East				
Kraft Sausage Rolls	Sausage rolls	United Kingdom			Discontinued	
Lender's	Baked Goods (bagels)	North America		1996	Sold to Pinnacle Foods	Financed by Blackstone Group
Life Savers	Confectionery (mints)	Canada		1987	Sold to Hershey's	Owned by Wm. Wrigley Jr. Company
Life Savers	Confectionery (mints)	United States		2005	Sold to Wm. Wrigley Jr. Company	
Light N' Lively	Dairy (ice cream)	North America		1993	Sold to Unilever	
Light N' Lively	Dairy (yogurt)	North America			Sold to CoolBrands International	
Milk-Bone	Dog treat	North America		2006	Sold to Del Monte Foods	Now owned by The J.M. Smucker Company
Minute Rice	Instant rice	North America		2006	Sold to Riviana Foods	
Oroweat	Baked Goods	North America		1995	Sold to Bestfoods	Owned by Grupo Bimbo
Parkay	Dairy (Butter)	North America		1995	Sold to Nabisco Brands, Inc.	Nabisco's butter business was sold to ConAgra Foods in 1999
Post Cereals	Breakfast cereal	Global		2008	Sold to Ralcorp Holdings	Brands included Shredded Wheat to Honey Bunches of Oats
Postum	hot cereal-based beverage	North America		2007	Discontinued	
Rondele	Dairy (cheese spread)	North America		1996	Sold to Waterbury Holdings	
Royal Lunch Milk Crackers	Crackers	North America		2008	Discontinued	
Sealtest	Dairy (ice cream)	North America		1993	Sold to Unilever	
Shredded Wheat	Breakfast cereal	Global		2008	Sold to Ralcorp Holdings	Part of Post Cereals sale
South Beach Living	Packaged Foods	Global		2009	Discontinued	
Specialty oils business	Edible oils	Global		1995	Sold to Associated British Foods	
Spreadery	Dairy (cheese spread)	North America			Discontinued	
Stella D'oro	Biscuit	North America		2006	Management buyout, financed by Brynwood Partners	Now owned by Lance Inc.
Stove Top Oven Classics	Frozen food	North America		2003	Discontinued	
Tombstone (pizza)	Frozen foods (Pizza)	North America		2010	Sold to Nestle	The Kraft frozen pizza division is now part of Nestle D.S.D. (direct store delivery).
Touch of Butter	Dairy (Butter)	North America		1995	Sold to Nabisco Brands, Inc.	Nabisco's butter business was sold to ConAgra Foods in 1999. It is now discontinued.
Trolli U.S.	Confectionery	North America	2000	2005	Sold to Wm. Wrigley Jr. Company	Now owned by Farley's & Sathers
Uneeda Biscuits	Snack food (Crackers)	North America			Discontinued	Defunct From Nabisco Brands
Vegemite	Spread	Australia		2017	Sold to Bega Cheese	Although marketed in other countries, it has failed to catch on outside home territory.
Velveeta	Dairy (Processed cheese)	North America	1927			Owned by Kraft Heinz
Veryfine	Beverage	North America		2007	Sold to Sunny Delight	
Vitalite	Margarine	United Kingdom, Ireland		1996	Sold to St. Ivel	It was then purchased by Dairy Crest
Vizzolini	Dry Pasta	North America				Owned by Kraft Heinz

== See also ==
- List of Cadbury brands
- List of Nabisco brands
