= Kinh Do Corporation =

Vietnamese food company

Mondelez Kinh Do Corporation
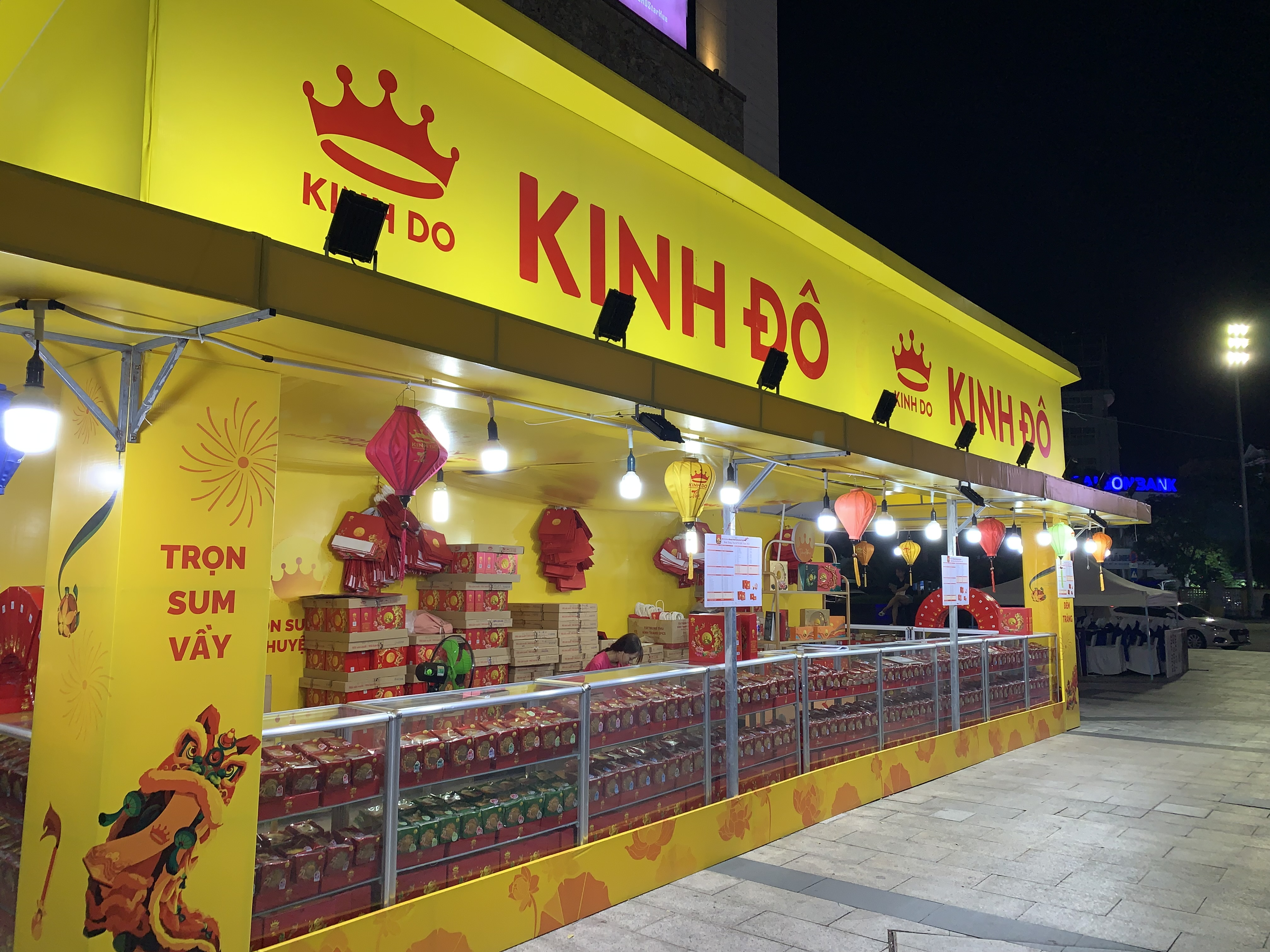
- A Kinh Đô mooncake booth in Huế
- Trade name: Mondelez Kinh Do
- Type: Joint Stock Company
- Industry: Food and drink
- Founded: 1993; 33 years ago
- Fate: Acquired by Mondelez International in 2016
- Headquarters: Ho Chi Minh City, Vietnam
- Products: Biscuits, fresh bread, sponge cakes, mooncakes, chocolates, and other confectionery
- Parent: Mondelez International
- Website: www.mondelezinternational.com/vietnam

Mondelez Kinh Do is part of Mondelēz International, Inc., located in Chicago, Illinois, United States. Its brands, both global and local, include Cosy biscuits, Kinh Do mooncakes, Solite cakes, Slide potato chips, AFC crackers, Oreo cookies, Ritz Crackers, LU biscuits, Toblerone chocolate, Cadbury Dairy Milk chocolate, Tang powdered beverage, Halls candy, Trident gum and many more. In Vietnam, it operates in three locations: Ho Chi Minh City, and plants in Bình Dương and Hưng Yên, with more than 3,000 employees.

== Company history ==
Mondelez Kinh Do Vietnam was established in 2015 after Mondelēz International, Inc. bought Kinh Do Corporation. Mondelēz Kinh Do is now a member of global snack company Mondelez International and the only US company in the confectionery market in Vietnam to supply all types of biscuits, fresh bread, sponge cakes, mooncakes, chocolates, and other confectionery.

=== History ===
Kinh Do Construction and Food Processing Company Limited was founded in 1993. The company began construction on a factory at 6/134 National Highway 13, Hiep Binh Phuoc Ward, Thủ Đức District, Ho Chi Minh City, in 1996. At the same time, the company also invested in a cookie production line with modern Danish technology and equipment worth US$5 million. In 1997–1998, the company continued investing in a production line for bread and sponge cake with a total investment value of over $1.2 million. A chocolate candy production line also began operation at that time with a total investment of about $800,000.

In 2000, the company increased investment capital to VND 51 billion, and expanded the factory to nearly 60,000 m^{2} (650,000 sq ft), of which the factory area was 40,000 m^{2} (430,000 sq ft). To diversify products, the company invested in a cracker production line from Europe worth over $2 million. The following year, a new hard candy production line and a modern fondant production line started operation with a total value of US$2 million, with a capacity of 40 tons/day to meet the needs of the market domestically and internationally. By June 2001, the company's total investment capital was up to $30 million. The company put into operation one more cracker production line with a value of $3 million and a capacity of 1.5 tons/hour. Kinh Do factory in Hưng Yên was also put into operation to serve the market in Hanoi and the northern provinces.

In 2001, the company promoted exports to the US, France, Canada, Germany, Taiwan, Singapore, Cambodia, Laos, Japan, Malaysia, Thailand.

In 2002, the company's products and production lines were certified to ISO 9002 and later to ISO 9002:2000. Raising charter capital to 150 billion VND, the company entered the mooncake market and changed its name to Kinh Do Corporation.

In 2015, Mondelēz International acquired Kinh Do's confectionery business and changed its name to Mondelez Kinh Do Vietnam Joint Stock Company. Mondelēz Kinh Do is currently a member of the global Mondelēz International group, headquartered in Chicago, Illinois, United States.
