= Lacta =

Lacta is the name of two chocolate-manufacturing companies. It may refer to:

- Lacta (Brazilian company)
- Lacta (Greek company)
