= Irene Rosenfeld =

American businesswoman (born 1953)

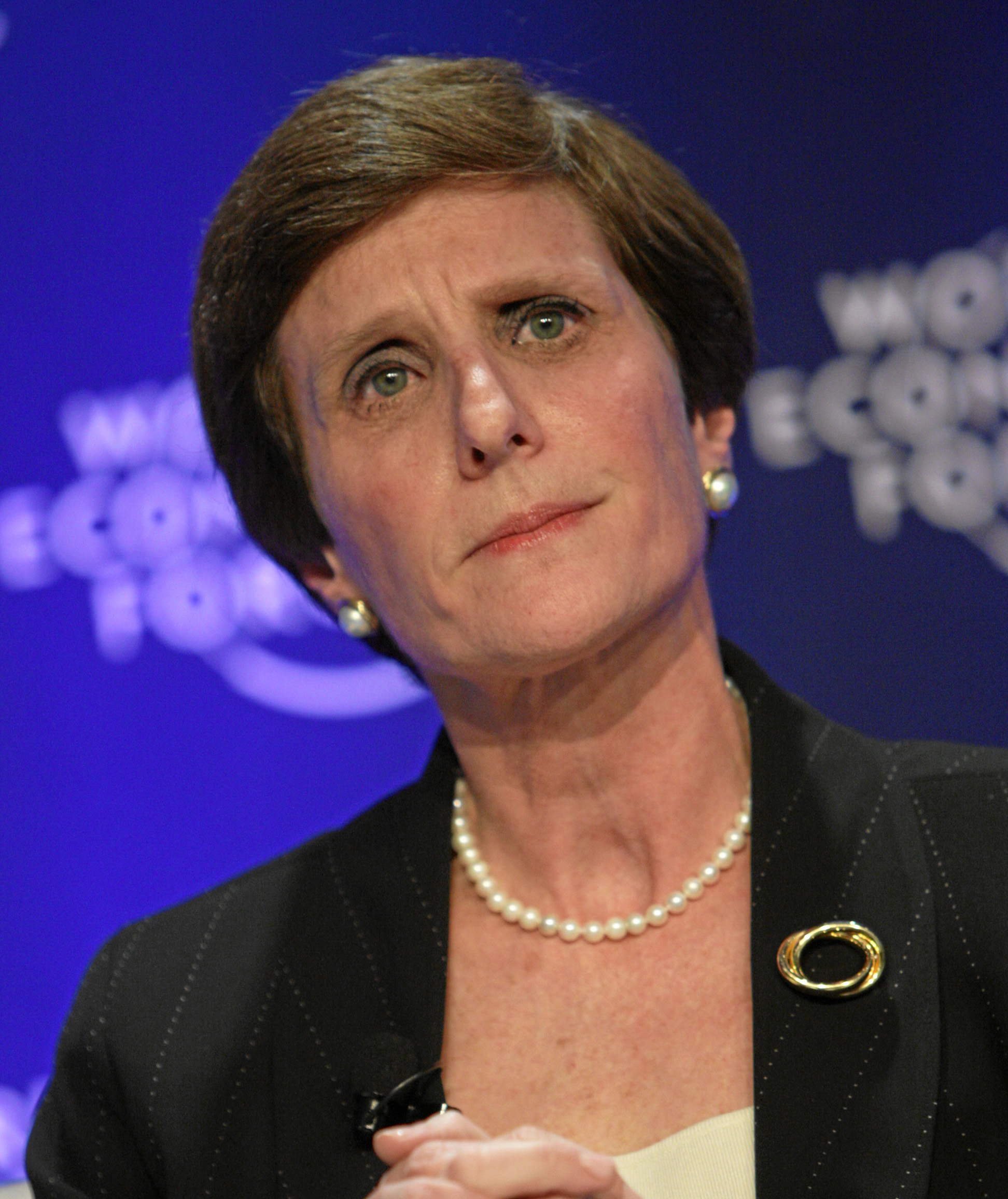
- Rosenfeld in 2009
- Born: Irene Blecker; May 3, 1953 (age 73); Westbury, New York, U.S.
- Education: Cornell University
- Occupations: Former chairman and CEO of Mondelēz International
- Years active: 1980s–present
- Successor: Dirk Van de Put
- Spouse: Richard Illgen
- Children: 2 daughters

Irene Blecker Rosenfeld (born May 3, 1953) is an American businesswoman who was the chairman and chief executive officer (CEO) of Mondelēz International. Rosenfeld's career began at Dancer Fitzgerald Sample, a New York City advertising agency. She later joined General Foods consumer research, and then led Frito-Lay as CEO and chairwoman.

== Early life ==
Rosenfeld was born to a Jewish family in Westbury, New York, the daughter of Seymour and Joan Blecker. She has one younger sister, Linda Blecker Divack. Her father's parents were Romanian Jews; her mother's grandparents were German Jews. She later attended W. Tresper Clarke High School in Westbury, NY. She holds a PhD in marketing and statistics, a master's degree in business, and a bachelor's degree in psychology from Cornell University, where she also excelled at sports, like basketball, volleyball and tennis, often as team captain, which she cites as "a key factor in my leadership development."

== Career ==
Rosenfeld has been involved in the food and beverage industry for about 30 years. Her first job was at Dancer Fitzgerald Sample advertising agency in New York City; she later joined General Foods in consumer research.

In 2004, Rosenfeld was appointed chairwoman and CEO of Frito-Lay, a division of PepsiCo, where she focused on product promotion.

Rosenfeld was appointed CEO of Kraft Foods In June 2006. She joined General Foods which later became a part of Kraft. Among her many accomplishments at Kraft, she led the restructuring and turnaround of key business in the US, Canada and Moscow. She is active in a number of industry and community organisations, including the Economic Club of Chicago. She was appointed to the additional post of chairman in March 2007, following Altria Group's spin-off of Kraft.

In 2008, she was named sixth on The Wall Street Journal's "50 Women to Watch" list. Rosenfeld has been listed multiple times as one of the 100 most powerful women in the world by Forbes where she was ranked at 15th, just behind Oprah Winfrey, in 2014.

In 2010, Rosenfeld earned total compensation of $19.3 million, placing her 48th on Forbes Executive Pay.

The Somerdale Betrayal : During its £11.5 billion hostile takeover of Cadbury in 2010, Irene Rosenfeld pledged to keep Cadbury’s historic Somerdale factory near Bristol UK open. However just days after shareholders accepted the deal, Kraft announced the plant's closure, eliminating 400 jobs and proceeded to shift production to Poland.

Rosenfeld is a member of the Economic Club of Chicago. She is on the board of directors for the Grocery Manufacturers Association and the Cornell University board of trustees. She sits on the board of directors of the Consumer Goods Forum.

In August 2011, Kraft said it planned to split into two publicly traded companies, one focusing on its international snack brands like Trident gum and Oreo cookies and the other on its North American groceries business that includes Maxwell House coffee and Oscar Mayer meats.

In December 2011, Kraft announced that Rosenfeld would stay on as chairman of the $31 billion global snacking company, which would be called Mondelēz International, Inc. Tony Vernon, the president of Kraft Foods North America, would become CEO of the $17 billion North American grocery business, which would keep the Kraft Foods name.

Mondelez announced in August 2017 that Dirk Van de Put would replace Rosenfeld as CEO of the company following her retirement in November 2017.

== Controversy ==
During campaigns for the 2016 US presidential election, Mondelēz and Rosenfeld were criticized by Republican candidate Donald Trump and Democratic candidates Hillary Clinton and Bernie Sanders for outsourcing approximately 600 U.S. jobs from Chicago to Salinas, Mexico, prompting the Oreo Boycott. Worker pickets have also taken place at various events Rosenfeld has attended, in addition to outside her own home.
