= Koogle (disambiguation) =

Koogle is a flavored peanut butter brand.

Koogle may also refer to:

- Jacob Koogle, Medal of Honor recipient during the American Civil War
- Timothy Koogle, first CEO of Yahoo!
