= Dairylea (cheese) =

Processed cheese brand in Ireland and the UK

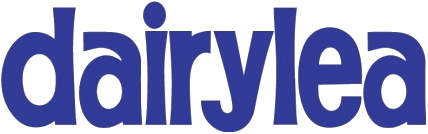
- Product type: Cheese
- Current owner: Mondelēz International
- Country: United Kingdom
- Introduced: 1950; 76 years ago
- Markets: UK and Ireland
- Website: dairylea.co.uk

Dairylea is a brand of processed cheese products produced by Mondelēz International and sold in Ireland, the United Kingdom and Australia.

== Background ==
Dairylea is usually in the form of a thick, spreadable soft cheese-flavoured paste. It used the slogans "Kids will eat it until the cows come home" and "Kids will do anything for the taste of Dairylea" in a series of adverts on UK television showing children trading toys and other items of value, or doing dares for Dairylea Triangles.

== Manufacture ==
For many years, Dairylea has been made at Mondelez International's Namur production site south of Rhisnes, La Bruyère, north of Namur, the centre of Wallonia (the south of Belgium). The plant also makes Philadelphia cream cheese, and is near the A15 motorway, accessed via the N4. The company also had a processed cheese factory in Anderlecht in Brussels.

== Products ==
Dairylea spread is packaged in a plastic tub. Dairylea triangles are packaged in a cardboard 'wheel' and opening it reveals the foil-wrapped soft cheese product portions. Dairylea also comes in both its original form and a 'Dairylea Light' product marketed as 7% fat. Kraft implies that the product is credited with getting children more interested in cheese.

== History ==
Dairylea triangles were first introduced in 1950. In the early 21st century, Dairylea Lunchables were advertised as being "full of good stuff", though the product contained high amounts of salt and saturated fats. Despite a 2007 reformulation that reduced salt content by 9% and saturated fat content by 34%, the claim "full of good stuff" was banned by the UK's Advertising Standards Authority. Kraft meanwhile stated that the salt content in Lunchables had been reduced by a third between 2005 and 2007.

== Sponsorship ==
In the late 1990s, Dairylea Dunkers sponsored the 1999–2000 British Basketball League season, in the British Basketball League.

== See also ==
- List of spreads
