= Terrabusi =

Argentine food brand

Terrabusi Hnos.
- Type: Private (1911–94)
- Industry: Food
- Founded: 1911; 115 years ago in Buenos Aires
- Founder: Ambrosio, Felipe and Julio Terrabusi
- Fate: Acquired and merged to Nabisco in 1994, becoming a brand of it
- Headquarters: General Pacheco, Argentina
- Products: Cookies, crackers, alfajors
- Owner: Nabisco (1994–2000); Kraft Foods Inc. (2000–12); Mondelez (2012–pres.)

Terrabusi is an Argentine food brand currently owned by US conglomerate Mondelez International. The former manufacturing company had been founded by the Terrabusi brothers in 1911, and soon gained a reputation as a cookies and crackers manufacturer, commercialising its products under several brands. In 1994, Terrabusi was purchased by U.S.-based company Nabisco, which would be acquired by Philip Morris Companies, Inc. (parent of Kraft Foods Inc. since 1988) in 2000. As a result, both food companies joined.

In 2007, Kraft Foods Inc. spun off from Altria (ex Philip Morris), taking Nabisco (and other brands including Terrabusi) with it. Five years later, Kraft Foods split its business into two food companies, Kraft Foods (a new company but keeping the 'Kraft' name, focused on the local market) and Mondelez International (worldwide market). In Argentina, Mondelez set up its headquarters at the former Terrabusi factory in General Pacheco.

== History ==
Italian brothers Ambrosio, Felipe and Julio Terrabusi arrived in Argentina at the end of the 19th century. They founded a company, "Terrabusi Hermanos", in 1911 to produce biscuits. The company set a plant on Sadi Carnot street, employing 25 people. Terrabusi produced 5 tons of biscuits per month. In 1919, the company moved to a 25,000 m2 factory on San José street also in Buenos Aires, By those years, the company launched "Express", a successful line of crackers.

The company launched some products that became not only a success but landmarks of Terrabusi, such as "Tita", "Manon", "Rhodesia", and "Melba". The success of some of its products helped the company increase its sales to the point that Terrabusi relegated rival company rival Bagley as the main food manufacturer in Argentina. By 1958, the company popularised the slogan "Dígale sí a Terrabusi" ("Say 'yes' to Terrabusi") that remained for decades.

In 1963, with the leadership of Carlos Terrabusi and Gilberto Montagna Terrabusi, the company moved its business to the "Establecimiento Modelo Terrabusi" (Terrabusi model plant) in the city of General Pacheco. Terrabusi then launched "Don Felipe", a pasta brand named after one of the three founders of the firm.

In 1981, American conglomerate Nabisco started doing business in Argentina after merging with Standard International. Nabisco acquired Terrabusi in 1994 for US$361 million. After the purchase, Carlos Terrabusi and Montagna retired to go on agricultural sector and horse breeding. In 1996, other three food companies, Mayco, Capri, and Vizzolini, were added to Nabisco Royal Argentina Inc.

In 2001, Kraft Foods Inc. bought Nabisco for US$14,000 million, taking over all the Terrabusi line of products. Nabisco would then acquire other local food companies (mainly cookies manufacturers) such as Canale (popular brand of biscuits and owner of Cerealitas cracker brand, managed by Grupo Macri that had losses for AR$14,014,113 in 1998) Mayco, Capri, Royal, and Tasti. As of August 2021, Mondelez International controls Terrabusi operations in Argentina.

The Terrabusi's pasta line was acquired by local Molinos Río de la Plata (owned by the Pérez Companc family) to Mondelez in 2014. Molinos paid AR$130,7 million not only for the use of the Terrabusi brand but for a manufacturing plant in Tres Arroyos. The agreement also included other pasta brands such as Vizzolini, Don Felipe, and Canale, for which Molinos paid other 15 million.

== Products and brands ==
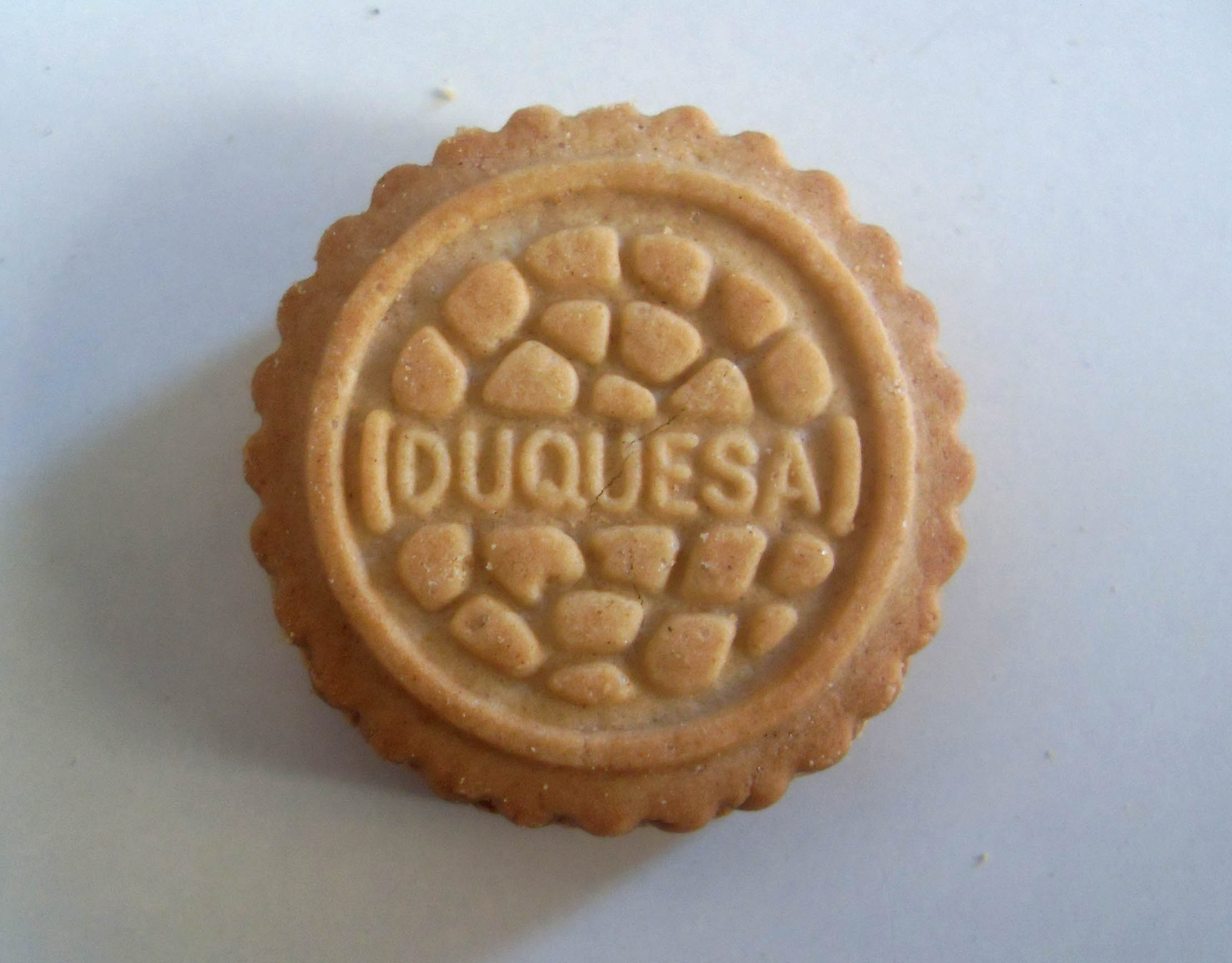
"Duquesa", Terrabusi's sandwich cookie

Products by Terrabusi include:

- Duquesa (sandwich cookie)
- Express (cracker)
- Lincoln (biscuit)
- Manon (biscuit)
- Melba (sandwich cookie)
- Rhodesia (filled biscuit)
- Tita (filled biscuit)
- Terrabusi alfajor

Some Terrabusi products were discontinued after the purchase, such as "Aventura", and the traditional Canale biscuits, created by Amadeo Canale in the later 1890s. The company (and its flagship product) were sold in 1995 to Groupo Socma, owned by the Macri family. As of May 2021, Terrabusi alfajor ranked among the 10 top-selling alfajores of Argentina.

== Myths and facts ==
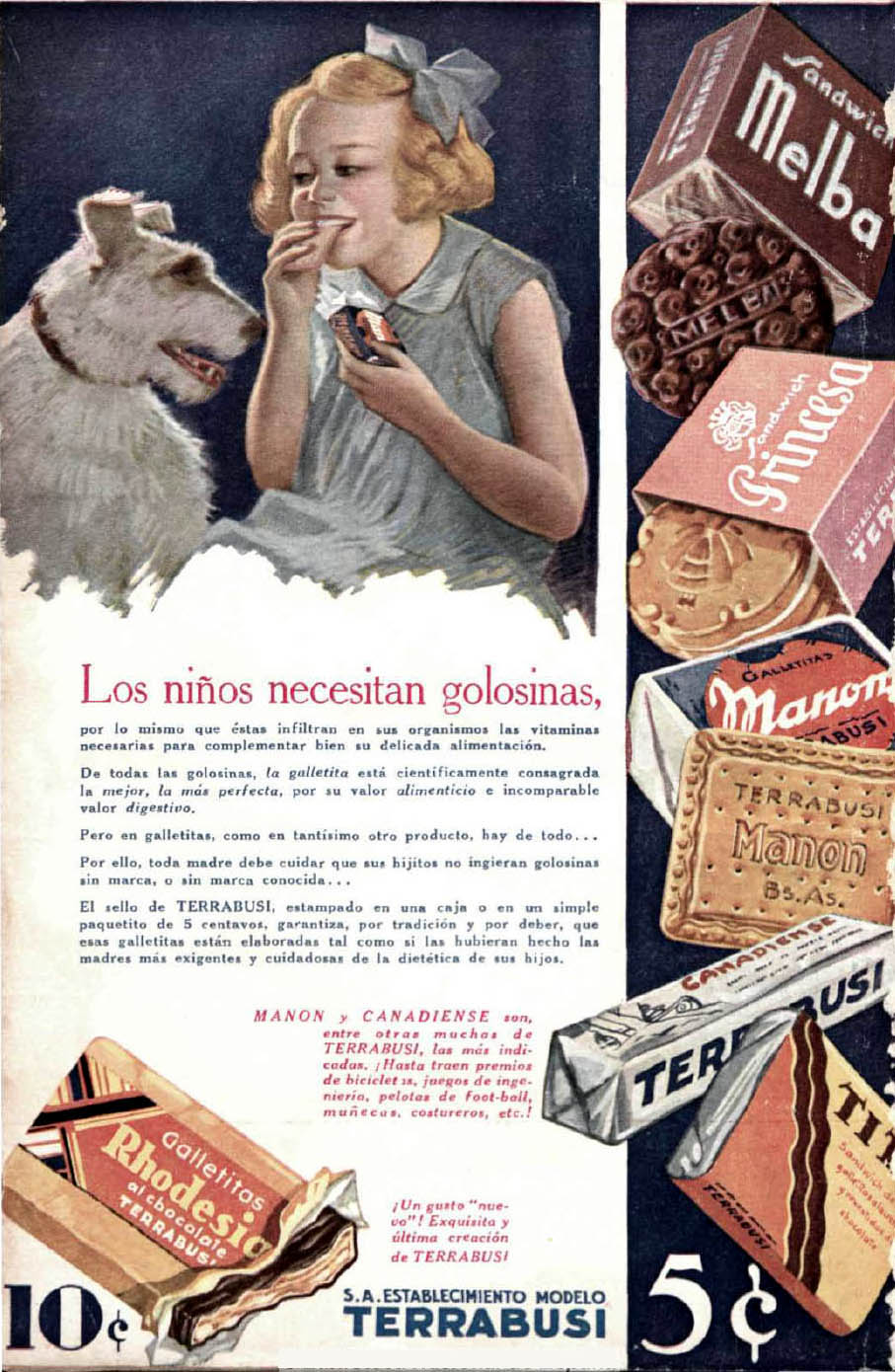
Terrabusi ad of 1936 displaying its line of products

There are some stories based in popular beliefs about the company and its people. All of them refers to Julio Terrabusi's wife and her second husband and how their relationship had influenced the origins of some of Terrabusi's most popular brands (such as Tita or Rhodesia). One of the most spread stories said that after the passing of Julio Terrabusi, in 1943 his wife Lidia married Edelmiro Rhodesia, who was later incorporated to the company. Soon after, Terrabusi launched "Melba", a chocolate-flavored cookie named after Lidia and Edelmiro's daughter.

Another stories set up the launch of "Tita" (a lemon-filled sandwich biscuit that would become one of the most successful products of the firm) in 1949, with "Rhodesia" (a similar confection and also a success) being released soon after and named after Edelmiro Rhodesia.

Nevertheless, none of those stories could be proved, with no records of the existence of Edelmiro Rhodesia. Moreover, the dates of creation of those confections are wrong and also seems to be the stories about them. As a matter of fact, an advertisement published in Caras y Caretas in 1936 cited Tita, Rhodesia, Manon, and other brands as products by the firm so they had been created by the Terrabusi brothers, shattering all the stories regarding other inventors and their circumstances.
