= Trakinas =

Sandwich cookie

- Product type: Sandwich cookie
- Current owner: Mondelez International
- Country: Brazil
- Introduced: 1988; 38 years ago
- Markets: Argentine, Brazil, China, Mexico (Mascaritas), Indonesia (1996-2005), Canada, Malaysia, Thailand, United Arab Emirates
- Previous owners: Nabisco (1988–2000); Kraft Foods Inc. (2000–12)

Trakinas is a Brazilian sandwich cookie brand originally created by the Nabisco company in 1988. The product is known for being mainly focused on children and consists of two (usually chocolate) biscuits with a sweet crème filling, with the difference that each cookie is modeled in the shape of a face with two holes for the eyes and one for the mouth.

When Nabisco was sold to Philip Morris in 2000, Trakinas were manufactured by its subsidiary Kraft Foods Inc. Since 2012, the cookies has been manufactured by Mondelez International, one of the two companies established when Kraft Foods spun off.

The brand was considered the 2nd most spontaneously remembered biscuit brand by consumers and the 4th strongest in the category, according to data released by the Kantar research center in 2018.

== Flavors ==
The brand is best known for being sold in chocolate and strawberry flavors. However, other flavors have also been sold over the years such as white chocolate, lemon, banana, berries and chocolate with hazelnut. On some occasions the cookies has already been sold with two flavors for the filling each flavor being a half of the cookie, being called Trakinas Meio a Meio.

In 2022, a special tutti-fruti flavor based on the Bubbaloo gum was launched.

== Other products ==
Trakinas brand Easter eggs have been sold for several years in Brazil. In 2012 the brand began to be sold as a ready-to-drink beverage under the name Trakinas Shake, in chocolate and strawberry flavors. Trakinas Shake was discontinued in 2014.
