= Eden (cheese) =

Philippine brand of processed cheese

- Logo in use since 2020.
- Product type: Processed cheese
- Current owner: Mondelez International
- Produced by: Mondelez Philippines
- Country: Philippines
- Introduced: 1981; 45 years ago
- Markets: Philippines
- Previous owners: Kraft Foods Philippines

Eden is a processed filled cheese food (labeled as "processed filled cheese spread") brand owned by Mondelez International. It was first launched in the Philippines by Kraft Foods Philippines (predecessor of Mondelez) in 1981.

== Varieties ==
- Eden Original
- Eden Singles
- Eden Cheddar
- Eden Melt Sarap (quick-melt cheese food)
- Eden Queso de Bola Flavor (available during Christmas season)

=== Other Eden products ===
- Eden Mayo
- Eden Cream Cheese
- Eden Sandwich Spread
