= Barny Cakes =

UK cake brand

Barny
- Alternative names: Ourson, Barni, Brumik, Dörmi, Lubisie, Teddy Grahams
- Course: Snack/Pudding
- Created by: Mondelēz International
- Invented: 1999; 26 years ago
- Main ingredients: Sponge
- Variations: Chocolate filling Milk flavoured filling Strawberry filling Apple filling
- Food energy (per 30g serving): 119 kcal (500 kJ)
Nutritional value
(per 30g serving)
- Protein: 1.8g g
- Fat: 4.8g g
- Carbohydrate: 18g g

Barny is a brand of cakes, mainly distributed in the United Kingdom. Mondelēz claimed it was its biggest biscuit category launch since Belvita in 2010. The product is distributed in over 40 countries.

It is also marketed in Czech Republic as "Brumík", in Poland as "Lubisie", in Romania as "Barni", in France as "Ourson" and in Hungary as "Dörmi".

== Fillings ==
Barny cakes have a range of four different fillings:

- Chocolate
- Milk
- Strawberry
- Apple
