= Tony Vernon =

United States businessman

W. Anthony Vernon is an American business executive who was the first chief executive officer of Kraft Foods after it was spun off from the Mondelēz International in 2012. Prior to his time at Kraft, he had a 23-year career at Johnson & Johnson and spent three years with Ripplewood Holdings. When he took on this position his salary increased to $1m per annum. Vernon’s overall compensation was $9.19 million for 2013.

== Education ==
Vernon holds a bachelor's degree from Lawrence University in history and a Master of Business Administration from the Kellogg Graduate School of Management at Northwestern University.

== Career ==
During his 23-year career at Johnson & Johnson, Vernon ran independent business units and led consumer brands such as Tylenol, Motrin, Pepcid AC, Imodium and Splenda. He then was healthcare industry partner of Ripplewood Holdings for three years before joining Kraft in 2009. In June 2009, Kraft Foods Inc. announced that Vernon would become President of Kraft Foods North America that August, replacing Rick Searer. In December 2011, when the company announced that it would reorganize in 2012, Vernon was announced as the CEO of the grocery business that became the current incarnation of Kraft. After Mondelēz International spun off Kraft on October 1, 2012, Vernon became CEO. At the time of the split, Kraft Foods (which included brands such as Oscar Mayer, Planters, Velveeta, Kool-Aid, Miracle Whip, Capri Sun, A1, Cool Whip and Jell-O) was the fourth-largest food and beverage company in North America, trailing PepsiCo, Nestle and Coca-Cola. His salary jumped by 49% during his first year as CEO to $6.83 million. In December 2014, the company announced that Vernon intended to retire as CEO effective from December 28, and that the company planned to replace him with Chairman John Cahill.

== Personal data ==
Vernon is married with three adult sons.
