= Honey Maid =

Graham cracker brand

- Product type: Graham cracker
- Current owner: Mondelez International
- Introduced: 1925

Honey Maid is a brand of graham crackers. First introduced by Nabisco in 1925, the brand is currently owned by Mondelez International.

== History ==
The Pacific Coast Biscuit Company of Seattle (later named National Biscuit Company and shortened to Nabisco) first introduced Honey Maid in 1925. The recipe used honey as an ingredient which was not the typical recipe at the time. They were first introduced as Sugar Honey Maid Grahams and renamed Honey Maid Graham Crackers in 1965. Nabisco also made a cookbook based on the crackers in order to promote the brand.

Honey Maid was acquired along with Nabisco in 2000 by Philip Morris Companies who merged it into Kraft Foods. It was later spun off with Kraft Foods into Mondelez International. By 2012, Honey Maid had a 49.4 percent share of the graham cracker market. Current flavors include original (honey), cinnamon, and chocolate.
