= Sonho de Valsa =

Brazilian bonbon

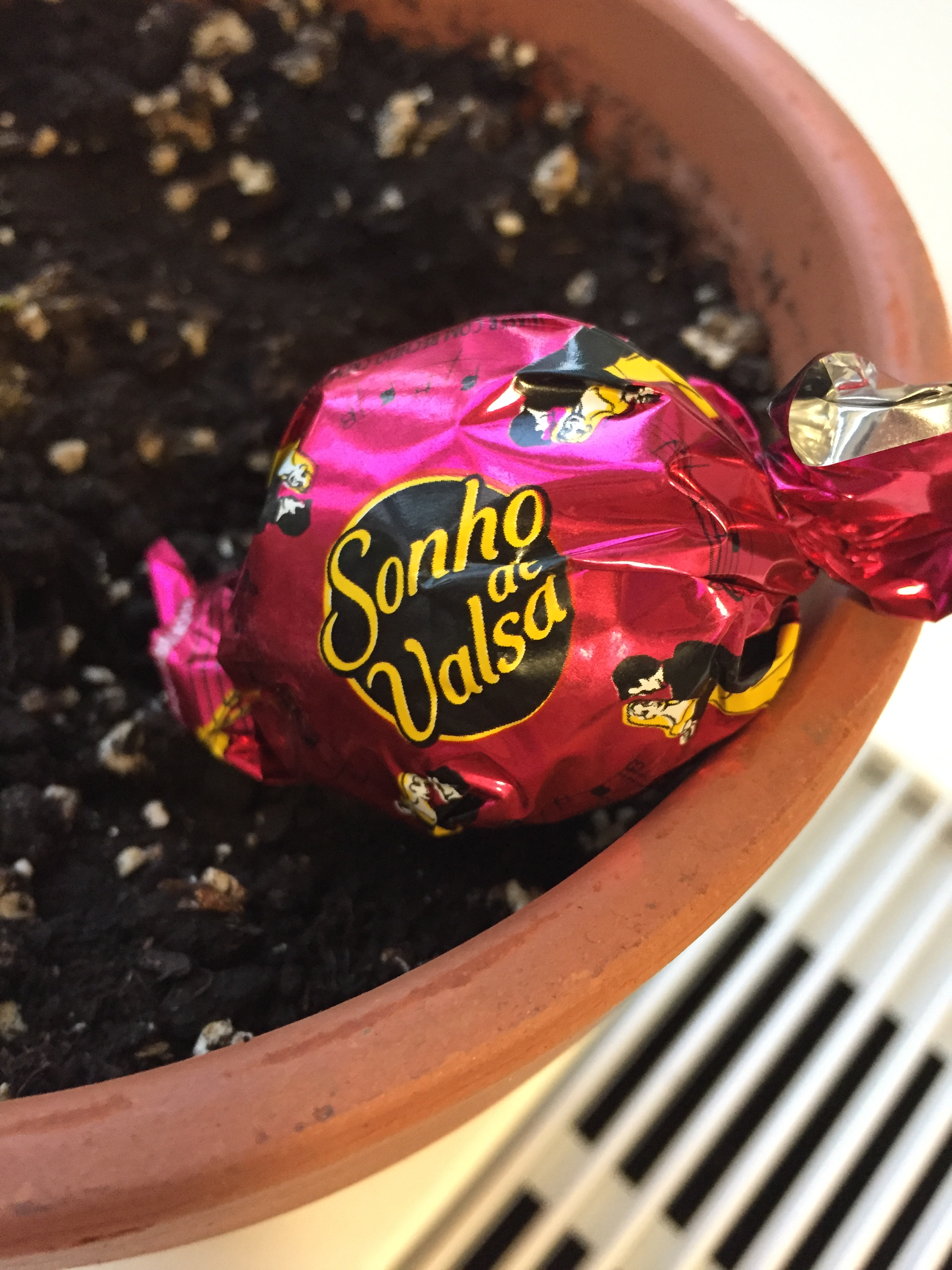
Chocolate bonbon Sonho de Valsa

Sonho de Valsa (transl. Waltz Dream) is a popular Brazilian bonbon made with chocolate and cashew nut filling. The chocolate was created in 1938 by the Brazilian Lacta company, which was later bought by Kraft Foods Brazil. Under Kraft, the bonbons have been exported to countries such as the United States, Paraguay, and Venezuela.

The candy consists of a wafer cone, covered with two layers of chocolate and stuffed with cashew cream.

== History ==
Sonho de Valsa was created by Lacta in 1938 when it was sold in bakeries selling bonbons. The target audience at the time was women. Sonho de Valsa has a romantic name, similar to other Brazilian candies such as Serenata de Amor (Love Serenade). The chocolate soon became an icon of love, and the act of gifting your beloved with a Sonho de Valsa is considered a gesture of affection between couples.

The foods division of Kraft Foods bought Lacta in 1996 and began to invest in other formats for commercial markets. Today, Sonho de Valsa is the best known candy consumed in Brazil, with over 21 billion units sold to date.

== Packaging ==
The packaging is a classic and has changed little in decades. Until 2019, the wrapper was of a paper rose, with the illustration of a couple dancing and, on the sides, an excerpt from Ein Walzertraum. However, until the start of production of cellophane in Brazil, Sonho de Valsa was wrapped in paper and covered with transparent red cellophane. A black seal with the product name and a drawing of a guitar completed the first package of the candy.

In 2001, some details have been changed in the package of Dream Waltz: the shape of the letters, instruments and clothes the couple wore underwent minor modifications.

In the 1990s, Dream Waltz went from being just a candy to becoming a brand of products. Realizing the great appeal of the product among consumers, have created various flavors and different formats. It is currently marketed in various packaging, among them the package with five chocolates (105g) package of one pound, collectible tins, packaging and heart-shaped chocolates in mini packs.

This approach was more sanitary as it makes it less likely small creatures (like ants) would be able to get into the packaging, as well as preventing tampering by humans.

=== Evolution ===
The new packaging maintains the quality of the chocolate longer and that, undoubtedly, will open more space for owners of small businesses start to marketing the product.

— Carlos Cortez, Kraft Foods Brasil

In April 2011, the packaging of the chocolate had its biggest change so far. Kraft, after two years of development, launched a package with a seal, in addition to being laterally wound. The objective of the new packaging was to keep the chocolate crispy for longer, especially in warmer climates and in humidity, and uses a technology similar to the packaging of Easter eggs. It was part of a plan to export the chocolate to foreign countries, especially those bordering Brazil. The colors and designs of the package, however, remained unchanged.

== Flavors ==
Besides the traditional Waltz Dream Milk, are also marketed the White Dream Waltz, the Waltz Dream Dream Waltz truffle and white truffle and black.

== See also ==
- Brigadeiro
