= Veryfine =

American juice beverage brand

- Product type: Beverage
- Current owner: Sunny Delight Beverages
- Country: United States
- Website: www.veryfine.com

Veryfine is a juice beverage brand currently owned by Sunny Delight Beverages. The company was started as Standard Vinegar Co. in Somerville, Massachusetts, in 1865. Arthur Rowse bought the company in 1900, changed the name to New England Vinegar Works in 1907, and moved the company to Littleton, Massachusetts, in 1930 to be closer to Massachusetts' apple orchards. In 1919, he added the Veryfine brand name for pasteurized apple juice. His descendants owned and operated Veryfine until selling it to Kraft Foods in 2004.

On October 2, 2007, Kraft announced the sale of Veryfine's Fruit2O water and juice brands to privately held Cincinnati-based Sunny Delight Beverages Co. The sale was completed sometime around the fourth quarter of 2007. Terms of the deal were not disclosed. Sunny Delight closed the Littleton facility at the end of 2015, ending 85 years of presence in that town. The Veryfine brand continues to be manufactured at other Sunny Delight facilities.
