= Dirk Van de Put =

Belgian businessman (born 1960)

- Born: 14 May 1960 (age 66); Mechelen, Antwerp Province, Belgium
- Citizenship: Belgium; United States
- Education: Veterinary medicine
- Alma mater: Ghent University; University of Antwerp
- Occupation: Businessman
- Title: Chairman and CEO, Mondelez International
- Term: November 2017–
- Predecessor: Irene Rosenfeld

Dirk Van de Put (born 14 May 1960) is a Belgian businessman, and the chairman and chief executive officer (CEO) of Mondelez International since November 2017.

== Early life ==
Van de Put is a native of Mechelen, Antwerp Province, Belgium, and has a veterinary medicine degree from Ghent University, and a master's degree in business from the University of Antwerp. He is fluent in Dutch, English, French, Spanish, and Portuguese.

== Career ==
Van de Put worked for Coca-Cola, Mars Inc, Novartis and Groupe Danone, before becoming CEO of the Canadian frozen foods manufacturer McCain Foods in 2010. He is a non-executive director of Mattel.

In November 2017, he succeeded Irene Rosenfeld as CEO of Mondelez International. He also became chairman in April 2018. He was hired by Mondelez with a reputation for driving growth in traditional packaged food brands. While Mondelez grew 1.5% in 2016 and 0.9% in 2017, Van de Put is promising organic revenue growth of 3% per year and is working to achieve this by increasing advertising spend and giving more responsibility to local marketing managers. In the third quarter of 2019, growth reached 4.2%, and operating profit for 2019 was increased by 20%.

== Personal life ==
Van de Put has Belgian and US citizenship. He is married and has two sons.

== Controversies ==
=== Child labour ===
In November 2023, International Rights Advocates filed a class-complaint against Mondelez International and Van de Put, alleging that as CEO:

rather than honor the pledge that they made [to phase out by 2005 their use of the Worst Forms of Child Labor as defined by ILO Convention No. 182.], defendants and all of the other major chocolate companies, have done little to address the ongoing and pervasive use of child workers performing the worst forms of child labor on their sourcing plantations and have focused on misleading the public by falsely claiming their “rehabilitation” programs offer meaningful assistance to children found working on their plantations.

=== Statements on activities in Russia during the Russo-Ukrainian War ===
As CEO of Mondelez International, Van de Put has defended the continued operation of the company in Russia during the Russo-Ukrainian War. In an interview with the Financial Times, Van de Put stated that were Mondelez to leave Russia, the assets of the company would be left to "friends of Putin," which would generate more cash to fund Russia's war efforts than the amount of taxes the company currently pays to Russia. Van de Put further asserted that "[t]here has been no shareholder pressure whatsoever" for Mondelez to end operations in Russia, and that shareholders do not "morally care" whether the company remains in Russia.

In an in-depth discussion as part of the BBC's Big Boss Interview series, Van de Put said: "I think over time you try to be neutral in the whole conflict. We're not trying to take any side."
