= Cadburys Tempo =

Chocolate bar produced by Cadbury South Africa

Cadbury Tempo

Tempo was a chocolate bar produced by Cadbury South Africa, described as a "Shortcake biscuit and caramel covered in Cadbury's dairy milk chocolate".

== About ==
The chocolate bar was unique to South Africa. Cadbury's South Africa also produces other bars only available in South Africa, such as "P.S", "Astro's", and "Question". The shortcake biscuit is surrounded by smooth, creamy caramel then smothered in Cadbury milk chocolate. Tempo was developed by Barry Fern and marketed by Lois Wagner in 1986 and was the most successful new product introduction into the snack market that decade. The Tempo was superseded by a bar called 5 Star in 2017.
