= 5 Star (chocolate bar) =

Brand of chocolate bar

- Product type: Chocolate bar
- Current owner: Cadbury; Lacta (Brazil market)
- Country: India (first introduction); United Kingdom (owner origin)
- Introduced: 1969; 57 years ago
- Markets: Brazil, India, Indonesia, Malaysia, Philippines, South Africa

5 Star is a chocolate bar produced by Cadbury and sold in India, Indonesia, Malaysia, Brazil, South Africa, the Philippines and Egypt. It is described as a "caramel and nougat" mix covered with "smooth milk chocolate" and is sold in a golden wrapper decorated with stars.

== History ==
5 Star was launched in India in 1969. In 2016 it was launched in Malaysia and the Philippines in 15g 'mini-bars', 45g standard bars and 150g sharepacks (of 10 mini-bars). It was launched in Brazil the same year but under Cadbury's sister brand Lacta.

5 Star has also been widely distributed in South Africa since 2017 as a replacement for the defunct Tempo bar.

== Varieties ==
In India, 5 Star is available in several flavours, including Oreo, Chomp, Fruit & Nut and Crunchy.
