= Tate's Bake Shop =

American cookie brand

Tate's Bake Shop, Inc.
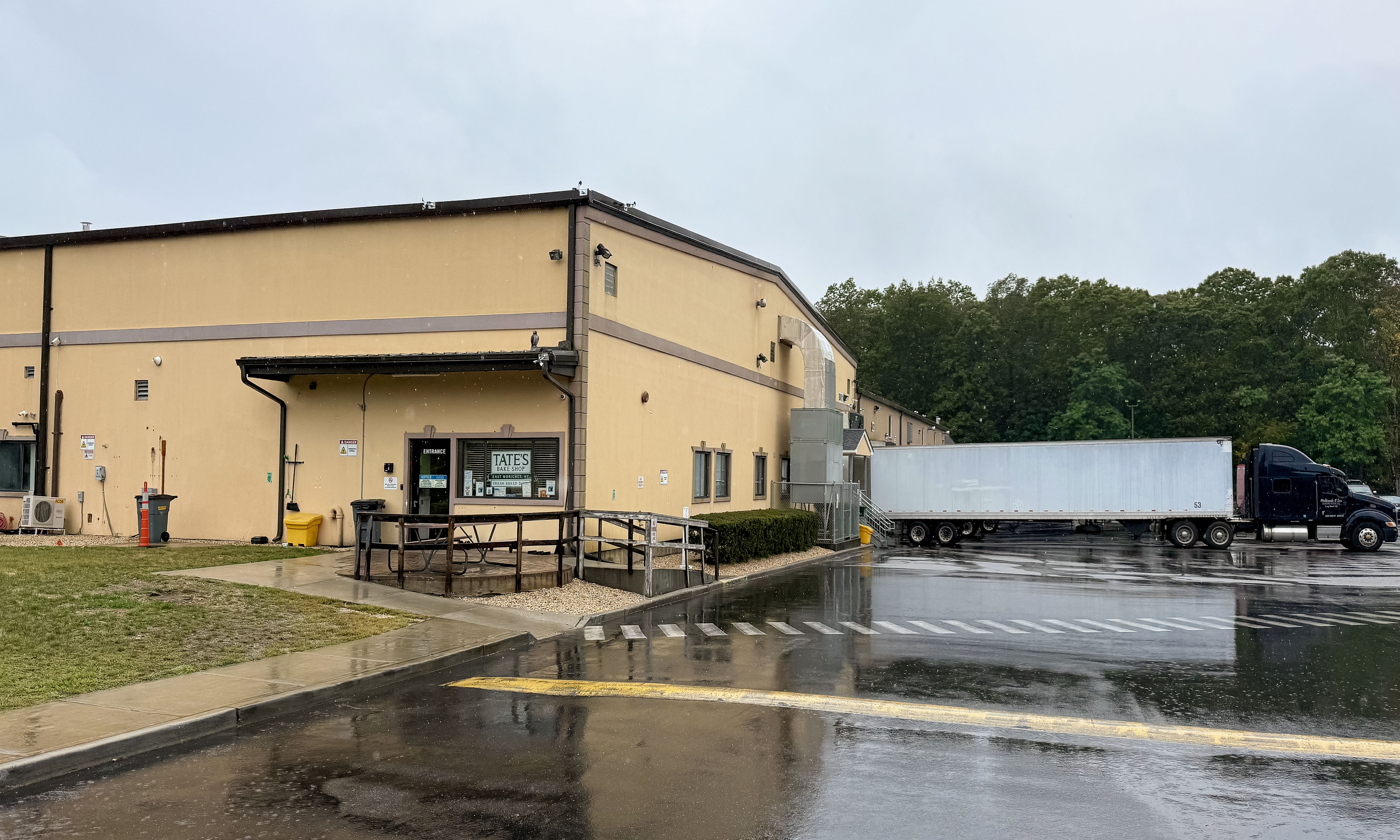
- 40,000-sq-ft factory in East Moriches, New York, which produces the brand’s cookies for national distribution
- Type: Subsidiary
- Industry: Confectionaries
- Founded: 2000; 26 years ago
- Founder: Kathleen King
- Headquarters: Westhampton Beach, New York, United States
- Key people: Laraine Miller (CEO)
- Number of employees: 320 (2018)
- Parent: Mondelez International (2018–present)

Tate's Bake Shop, Inc. is a baked goods manufacturer, known for its chocolate chip cookies. It was founded by Kathleen King in Southampton, New York, in 2000 and has been owned by Mondelez International since 2018.

Tate's Bake Shop maintains a retail store in Southampton and a wholesaler facility in East Moriches.

== History ==
Founder Kathleen King started baking when she was 11, selling her cookies at her family’s farmstand, North Sea Farms. In 1980, she started Kathleen’s Cookie, which later became Kathleen’s Bake Shop, located in Southampton. Two years later, she bought the building and began selling to businesses in New York City. By 1990, King had published a cookbook and had 40 employees.

After taking on business partners in 1998, the relationship soured and by February 2000, she had been ousted from her own company. King regained ownership of the manufacturing facility in court but lost ownership of Kathleen's Cookie, which was moved to Virginia. She re-established her company as Tate's Bake Shop, based on her father's nickname, in August 2000. The company began shipping to stores on Long Island and New York City that year.

Tate's expanded into gluten-free baking in 2013, opening a 3,000 square-foot kitchen facility to meet customer demand. By this point, the company was making one million cookies per week and posting over $12 million in annual revenue. Tate's cookies were also available in all 50 states. In 2014, King sold a majority stake in the business to private-equity firm Riverside Co. Tate's Bake Shop moved its corporate headquarters to Westhampton Beach, New York, in 2015, expanding the facilities by nearly 50% in 2018.

The company was sold to Oreo and Chips Ahoy maker Mondelez International in 2018 for some $500 million, and continues to operate as an independent business. King officially retired from the company. By the next year, Mondelez had expanded Tate’s factory and warehouses, hiring 100 additional workers and increasing production to 2 million cookies per day. In December 2023, Mondelez moved the company into a newly constructed warehouse and distribution development in Shirley. Its 40,000-square-foot factory in East Moriches remained in use.

In 2021, News12 reported that Tate’s Bake Shop faced accusations of threatening workers with deportation in response to unionization efforts.
