= Halls (cough drop) =

Cough drops brand

Halls Cough Drops

- A pack of Extra Strong Halls
- Current owner: Mondelēz International
- Country: England
- Introduced: 1930s
- Markets: Throat lozenges/cough drops
- Previous owners: Hall Brothers (1930–1964); Warner–Lambert (1964–2000); Pfizer (2000–2002); Cadbury (2002–2010); Kraft (2010–2012)
- Website: gethalls.com

Halls is a British brand of a mentholated cough drop (Note: Categorised as a cough suppressant/oral anaesthetic by the manufacturer and have long been advertised as featuring "vapour action".) owned by Mondelēz International since 2015. In 2016, it was one of the biggest selling brands of over-the-counter medications sold in Great Britain, with sales of £32.5 million.

Halls cough drops contain menthol, which acts as local anesthetic and creates a "cooling sensation". It also acts as a cough suppressant.

A pack of Mint and Eucalyptus flavoured Halls, as sold in Brazil

In warmer parts of the world, Halls is advertised as a mentholated hard candy and not a medicine for coughs.

== Company history ==
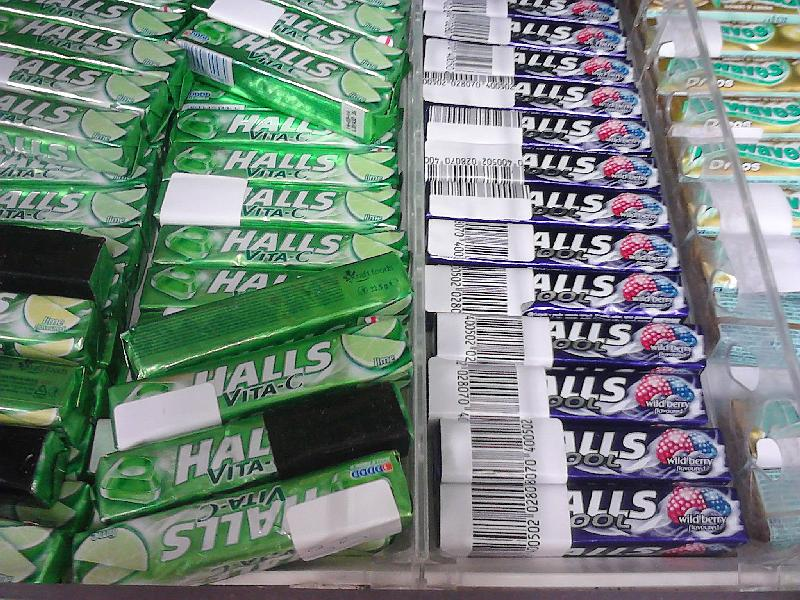
Packages of Halls in a store

The Hall Brothers company was founded in 1893 by the brothers Edwin Franklin Hall, Thomas Harold Hall, and Norman Smith Hall. In 1902, Edwin left the partnership but Thomas and Norman remained. Initially in the business of jam manufacturing, the brothers eventually branched into boiled sweets and candies. The company first introduced Mentho-Lyptus, a sweet containing menthol and eucalyptus, in 1927 as a remedy for sore throats and cough suppressant. The cough drops were introduced to the United States in the 1950s.

The Manchester-based company was acquired by Warner-Lambert in 1964. Production was moved to Dumers Lane, Radcliffe in 1970. Pfizer acquired Warner-Lambert for over $90 billion in 2000. In 2002, Pfizer announces to acquire Pharmacia, But because Pharmacia owns Luden's and Pfizer owned Halls, The FTC ruled that Pfizer can't legally own both Halls and Luden's as it will create a Duopoly in the cough drop market. As a result Pfizer sold Halls, along with Dentyne, Clorets, Certs, and Bubblicious to Cadbury Schweppes for $4.2 billion. Cadbury closed the Radcliffe factory at the end of 2004, as part of an effort to cut 10% of its global workforce, affecting 450 employees. By 2008, Halls accounted for one-third of Cadbury's candy revenues.

Kraft Foods bought Cadbury for $19 billion in 2010. When Kraft split into two entities in 2012, Halls remained under Mondelez. In 2022, Mondelez announced its plan to divest the company's gum assets, along with Halls and other non-core brands, in order to focus more on its cookie business. The gum brands were sold to Perfetti Van Melle in 2023, while Halls remains up for sale.
