= Lacta (Greek company) =

Milk chocolate confectionery company

- Greek Lacta packaging and logo
- Product type: Confectionery
- Current owner: Mondelez International
- Country: Greece
- Markets: Greece, Cyprus, Albania

Lacta is a series of Greek chocolate products created in 1962 by the Pavlidis confectioner, founded in 1841, in Athens, Greece. In 1991, Pavlidis company was sold to Kraft Foods Inc., which in turn was renamed Mondelez International. In addition to the standard milk chocolate bar, there are many different forms and flavours of Lacta, including Oreo, hazelnut, and strawberry yogurt. Lacta bars remain among the best selling chocolate bars in Greece.
