= Edward E. Rieck =

American businessman (1864–1944)

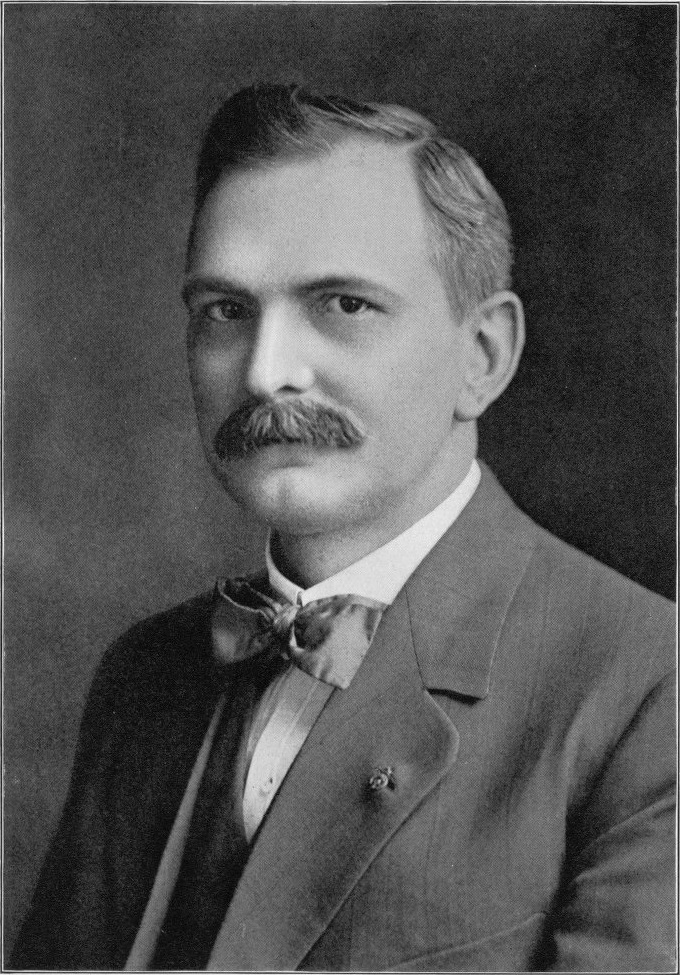
- Rieck c. 1913
- Born: Edward Ernest Rieck; October 27, 1864; Snowden, Pennsylvania, U.S.
- Died: January 10, 1944 (aged 79); Pittsburgh, Pennsylvania, U.S.
- Resting place: Homewood Cemetery
- Education: Humboldt Public School, St. Paul's Lutheran, Duff's College
- Occupation: Business magnate
- Known for: Building the largest dairy business in the U.S.
- Title: Founder of Edward E. Rieck Company
- Spouse: Amelia E. Junge (m. 1888–1916) Mary E. Caldwell (m. 1919–1944)
- Children: 5

Edward Ernest Rieck (October 27, 1864 – January 10, 1944) was an American entrepreneur who co-founded the Edward E. Rieck Company of Pittsburgh, Pennsylvania. He was a pioneer in employment of sanitation of the dairy industry via pasteurized milk.
