= Triscuit =

Snack crackers

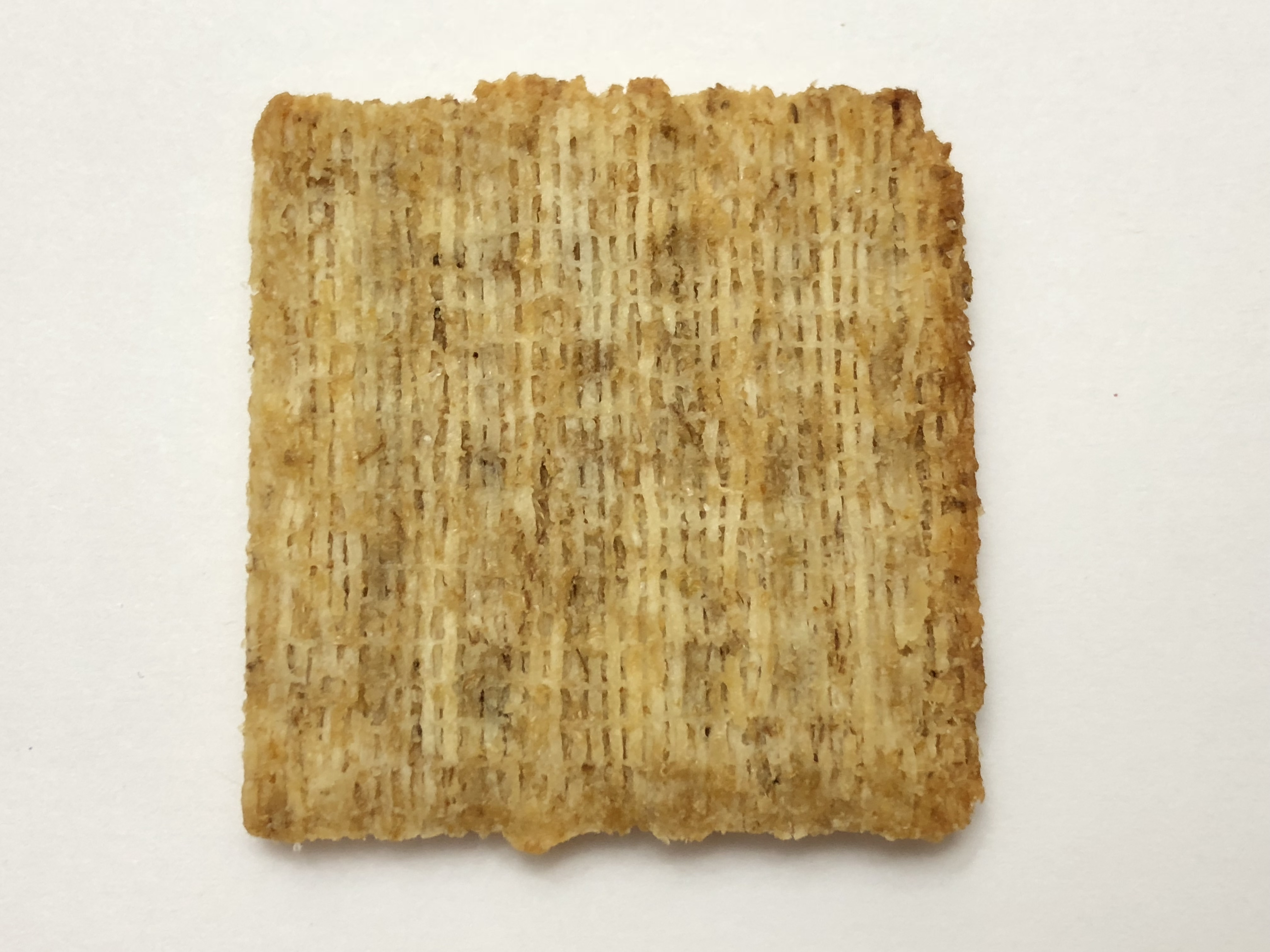
- Product type: Cracker
- Current owner: Mondelez International
- Introduced: 1903; 123 years ago
- Previous owners: Nabisco (1928–2012); Shredded Wheat Co. (1903–1928)
- Website: www.snackworks.com/brands/triscuit/

Triscuit is a brand name of snack crackers which take the form of baked square whole wheat wafers. Henry Perky invented Triscuits in 1900 and subsequently patented them in 1902. The Shredded Wheat Company began production the next year in Niagara Falls, New York. The Niagara site was chosen due to its proximity to the Niagara Falls hydroelectric plant, the first major power plant in the United States, which opened in 1895.

== History ==
The Shredded Wheat Company began producing Triscuits in 1903 in Niagara Falls, New York. The name may have come from a combination of the words electricity and biscuit. An alternative theory holds that the tri refers to the cracker's three ingredients (wheat, oil, and salt), but this is disputed due to conflicting advertisements and poor records. At least one early advertisement boasted that Triscuits were "baked by electricity," claiming they were "the only food on the market prepared by this 1903 process." Each cracker measured 2.25 by 4 inches (5.7 cm × 10.2 cm) and remained that size for nearly 21 years. The Shredded Wheat Company's ovens were then altered and the cracker size changed to 2-inch (51 mm) squares.

In 1928, the Shredded Wheat Company was purchased by Nabisco. Beginning in 1935, Triscuits were sprayed with oil and salted.

== Overview ==
Nutritional info
Nutritional value per around 6 crackers
- Energy: 502 kJ (120 kcal)
- Carbohydrates: 29 g
- Sugars: 0 g
- Dietary fiber: 3 g
- Fat: 3.5 g
- Saturated: 0 g
- Trans: 0 g
- Monounsaturated: 1 g
- Polyunsaturated: 2 g
- Protein: 3 g
Vitamins and minerals
Minerals	Quantity %DV^{†}
Calcium	1% 10 mg
Iron	8% 1.4 mg
Potassium	4% 116 mg
Sodium	7% 160 mg
- ^{†}Percentages estimated using US recommendations for adults, except for potassium, which is estimated based on expert recommendation from the National Academies.

Triscuits are made from wheat, first cooked in water until reaching approximately fifty percent moisture content, then tempered to allow the moisture to diffuse evenly in the grain. Slotted rollers form the grain into shredded wheat strands, which are then formed into webs. Several webs are stacked together and the moist stack is crimped to produce individual crackers. Oven baking then reduces the moisture content to five percent. The product is currently a 1.75-inch (4.4 cm) square.
