= Sunny Delight Beverages =

Beverage company

Sunny Delight Beverages Co.
- Founded: 2004; 22 years ago
- Founder: Procter & Gamble
- Headquarters: Blue Ash, Ohio, United States
- Key people: John Childs (chairman); William B. Cyr (president and CEO); William Schumaker (COO and CFO); Michael Burton (VP); John R. Crosetti (SVP US Sales)
- Parent: Harvest Hill Beverage Company

Sunny Delight Beverages Co. is the creator of SunnyD, formally known as Sunny Delight. It spun off from Procter & Gamble in 2004. The company is owned by Harvest Hill Beverage Company.

== History ==
The original predecessor of Sunny Delight Beverages Co., Sunny Delight, was founded in 1963 in Florida by Howard Dick and Phil Grinnell. In 1966, it was purchased by a Coca-Cola bottling operation, which later, in 1982, sold it and its now parent company, Doric Foods, to the bottler's parent, The Coca-Cola Company.

Doric Foods was then sold in 1983 to a joint venture between Charterhouse Group International and American Fruit Co., creating Sundor Brands Inc. Sundor was acquired by Procter & Gamble in 1989. In the late 1990s, SunnyD expanded into both Canada and Europe.

In 2004, Sunny Delight Beverages Co. was established when J. W. Childs, a Boston-based private equity firm, acquired Sunny Delight brands from Procter & Gamble. The company launched the Elations brand in 2007 and acquired Veryfine and Fruit2O from Kraft in the same year. In 2009, it acquired Bossa Nova from that brand's founder. Sunny Delight Europe was sold to Orangina Schweppes in 2011 and in 2016 J. W. Childs sold Sunny Delight Beverages Co. to Brynwood Partners.

On April 3, 2025, Brynwood Partners announced that it had reached a definitive agreement to sell its portfolio company, Harvest Hill Beverage Company, whose portfolio included the Sunny Delight brand, to Castillo Hermanos, a Guatemalan multinational diversified business group.

== Operations ==
The company’s main headquarters are located in Blue Ash, Ohio, with a head count of 615 employees. It operates five manufacturing plants located in the United States.
