= Koogle =

Peanut butter manufactured by Kraft

Koogle was a flavored peanut spread marketed by Kraft, introduced in 1971 (or 1975). A "grandfather" of the flavored peanut butter varieties of the early 21st century, it was available in several flavors: chocolate, cinnamon, vanilla, and banana.

== Ingredients ==
The testing by Consumer Reports found out that Koogle had just 60% peanut content and three times the sodium compared with regular peanut butter, concluding that "Nutrition and taste argue against buying Koogle." The peanut content was below the threshold set by FDA for the substance to be called "peanut butter". Koogle was withdrawn from the stores by the late 1970s.

The ingredient list for Koogle changed over its lifetime. Examples of ingredient lists include:

- Chocolate: U.S. grade no. 1 peanuts, partially hardened vegetable oils, sugar, cocoa processed with alkali, dextrose, salt, nonfat dry milk, artificial flavor
- Chocolate: Peanuts, partially hardened vegetable oils, sugar, milk chocolate (with artificial flavor and emulsifier added), chocolate liquor, dextrose, salt, artificial flavor
- Cinnamon: U.S. grade no. 1 peanuts, partially hardened vegetable oils, sugar, cinnamon, dextrose, salt

== Marketing ==
Many of Koogle's TV commercials featured the product's mascot, an oversized puppet costume in the abstract form of a giant jar with spinning eyeballs, frog-like arms and legs, and a "jive" voice similar to that of then-popular radio disc jockey Wolfman Jack. In the premiere commercial the mascot danced to a jingle, "Pea-nutty-koogle with the koo-koo-koogly eyes," which was modeled on Billy Rose's 1923 hit song "Barney Google (with the Goo-Goo-Googly Eyes)". Subsequent commercials had the mascot explaining the product to children in "jive" talk, or mothers endorsing the product to make it more appealing to mothers so they would be more willing to buy it for their children.

== Sources ==
- Krampner, Jon (2013). Creamy & Crunchy: An Informal History of Peanut Butter, the All-American Food. Arts and Traditions of the Table: Perspectives on Culinary History. New York: Columbia University Press. ISBN 978-0-231-16232-6. LCCN 2012008529.
- Tishfield, Holly (14 June 2025). "This Sugary Peanut Butter Spread Was A Snack Staple Of The '70s". Tasting Table. Static Media.
