= Fruit2O =

Water beverage

Fruit_{_{2}}O
- Type: Vitamin-enhanced water beverage
- Manufacturer: Sunny Delight Beverages
- Country of origin: United States
- Introduced: 1999; 26 years ago
- Website: https://fruit2o.com/

Fruit_{2}O, formerly manufactured by Kraft, is a lightly flavored, non-carbonated water beverage introduced in 1999. Fruit2o was introduced to compete not only with the bottled water market but also with the soft drink market. Sunny Delight Beverages purchased the Veryfine Products line from Kraft in 2007.

== Ingredients ==
Fruit2O was originally made by Veryfine Products of Littleton, Massachusetts, which used spring water, citric acid, natural flavors, sodium benzoate and potassium sorbate (to preserve freshness) and Splenda (sucralose) as its only sweetener. When Kraft purchased the company, it discontinued making the beverage with spring water, and added the artificial sweetener Ace-K (acesulfame potassium). Recently, Veryfine Products (Late 2008?) was spun off Kraft and Fruit2O returned to only using Sucralose for a sweetener.

Acesulfame K is 180–200 times sweeter than sucrose (table sugar), as sweet as aspartame, about half as sweet as saccharin, and one-quarter the sweetness of sucralose. Like saccharin, it has a slightly bitter aftertaste, especially at high concentrations. Kraft Foods has patented the use of sodium ferulate to mask acesulfame's aftertaste. Alternatively, acesulfame K is often blended with aspartame or other sweeteners. These blends are reputed to give a more sugar-like taste where each sweetener masks the other's aftertaste, and to exhibit a synergistic effect wherein the blend is sweeter than its components.

The current ingredients vary slightly with each flavor, but generally include purified water, less than 2% of natural flavor, citric acid, tartaric acid, malic acid, sucralose (Splenda), acesulfame potassium, sodium benzoate, and potassium sorbate.

It contains no calories, fat, or sugar.

Fruit2o Plus 10 ingredients also include ascorbic acid (vitamin C), niacinamide, vitamin B_{6}, vitamin B_{12}, calcium pantothenate (vitamin B_{5}) and biotin (B vitamins), vitamin E acetate, zinc gluconate, magnesium sulfate, sodium selenite, calcium disodium EDTA.

== Flavors ==
=== Original flavors ===
- Apple (discontinued)
- Cherry
- Cucumber Lemon
- Grape
- Lemon
- Lime (discontinued)
- Peach
- Orange
- Raspberry
- Strawberry
- Tropical Fruit
- Watermelon

=== Fruit2o Plus 10 Vitamins and Minerals ===
- Natural Berry
- Natural Apple
- Watermelon Kiwi
- Immunity: Berry Pomegranate
- Hydration: Strawberry Tangerine
- Relax: Tropical Fruit Blend
- Energy: Raspberry
- Energy: Blueberry
