= Belvita =

American breakfast biscuit brand

Bel-Vita

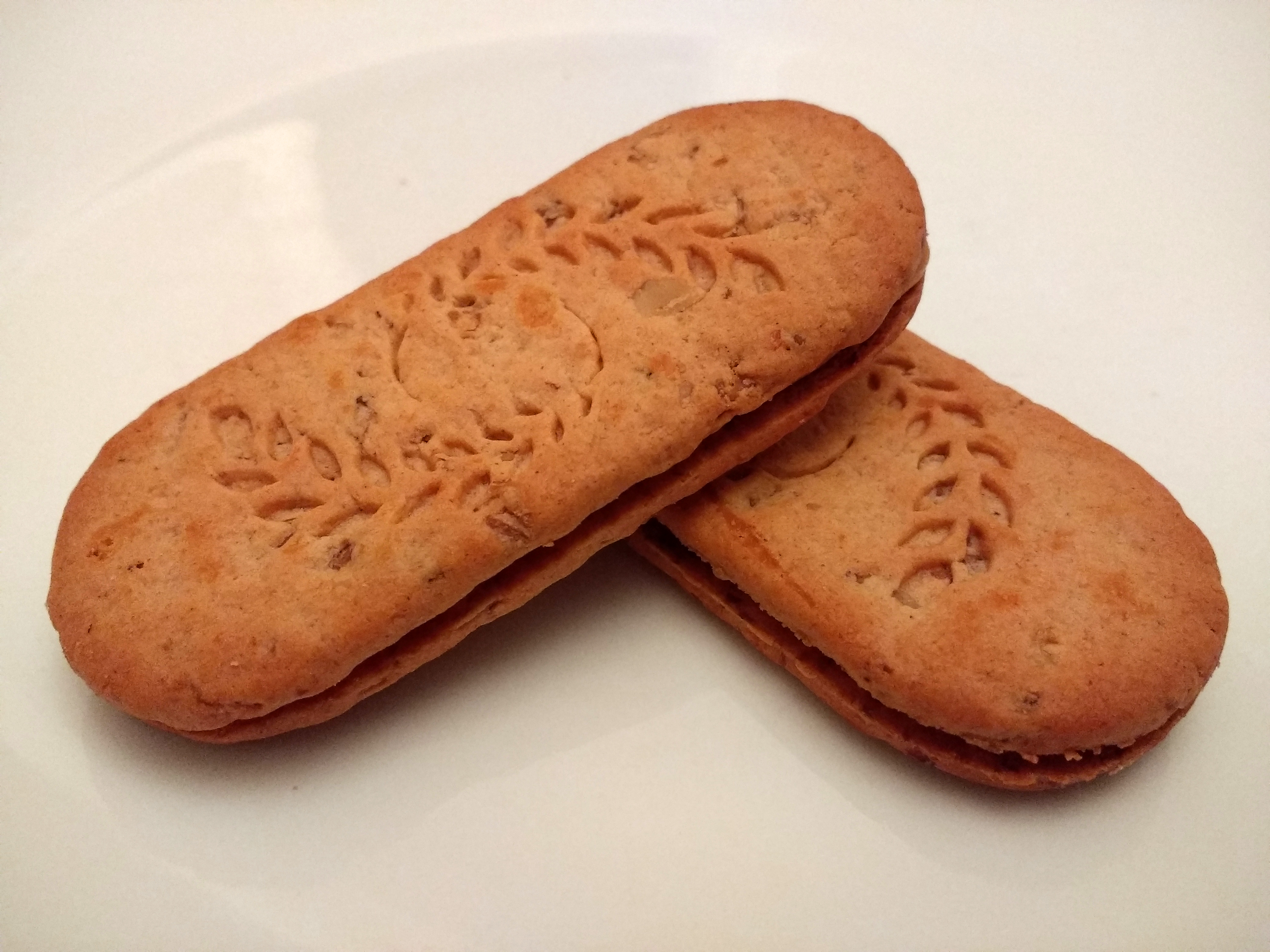
- Belvita sandwich biscuits
- Product type: Biscuit sandwich
- Current owner: Mondelez International
- Produced by: Nabisco/LU
- Country: France
- Introduced: 1998
- Markets: Global

Belvita, sometimes stylized as belVita or BelVita, is a brand of breakfast biscuit introduced originally in France in 1998 as LU Petit Déjeuner by Kraft Foods Inc. and currently owned by Mondelēz International.

== Overview ==
The biscuits were first introduced in France in 1998, expanding to seven additional European markets in 2000, Brazil in 2010 and the North American market in 2012.

In November 2011, Kraft Foods announced that it had given the advertising creative assignment for Belvita in the United States to Crispin Porter & Bogusky, an advertising agency under MDC Partners.

In August 2011, Kraft Foods announced an intention to split into two publicly traded companies; a new company called Kraft Foods Group (later merged with Heinz), and Mondelēz International (the original Kraft Foods Inc. renamed) which would retain the Nabisco subsidiary and brands such as Belvita. The split occurred in October 2012.

In October 2012 in the United Kingdom, amid a reported growth in sales for healthier biscuits, Belvita had the highest sales growth with sales rising 84.5% by value and 66% by volume.

In 2013, Mondelēz voluntarily recalled two varieties of Belvita biscuits in the United States after receiving notification that a fault at a third-party supplier's factory might have led to metal fragment contamination.

Starting in 2023, Nabisco and Kraft Foods manufactured and marketed Belvita as SinNegro in Indonesia, replacing the previous Hony Bran brand. The Milk Biscuit product line was discontinued in 2009, but Belvita was locally relaunched in 2016 as Cereal Biscuits.
