= Clorets =

Line of chewing gum and mints

- Product type: Chewing gum
- Current owner: Mondelez (2012–present)
- Country: United States
- Introduced: 1951; 75 years ago
- Previous owners: List: American Chicle Company (1951–62); Warner–Lambert (1962–2000); Pfizer (2000–02); Cadbury Schweppes (2002–10); Kraft (2010–12)

Clorets is a line of chewing gum and mints introduced in 1951 and owned by Mondelez International. Clorets gum and candy contain Actizol, a proprietary ingredient that contains chlorophyll, which purportedly acts as an active ingredient to eliminate mouth odors.

Clorets was originally owned by American Chicle Company, then by Warner-Lambert in 1962 under its Adams division until Pfizer took over in 2000. The Adams division was sold to Cadbury-Schweppes in 2002 and later became part of Kraft Foods after they acquired the company in 2010.

Clorets is widely available in South America, Central America, South Africa, West Asia and South-East Asia. The largest markets for Clorets are Mexico, Thailand, Egypt, Morocco and Japan.

== Packaging and flavor varieties ==
Packaging sizes

- Gum in 2s carton
- Gum in 12s carton
- Small mints (in a pack of 50)
- Candy-style mints (in a pack of 6)
- Tablet mints (in a pack of 35)
- Val-U-Pak (in a pack of 30)

Flavors

- Original/Cool Mint
- Arctic/Ocean Mint
- Orange Mint
- Lemon Mint
- Green Lime Mint
- Dark Secret Mint (Thailand)
- Cinnamon (Japan and Morocco)
- Cool Berry Mint
- Pink Grapefruit Mint

Clorets Infinity

- Peppermint
- Spearmint

== See also ==
- List of chewing gum brands
- List of breath mints
