= Philadelphia Cream Cheese =

Brand of cream cheese

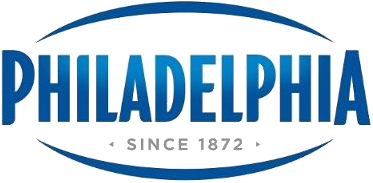

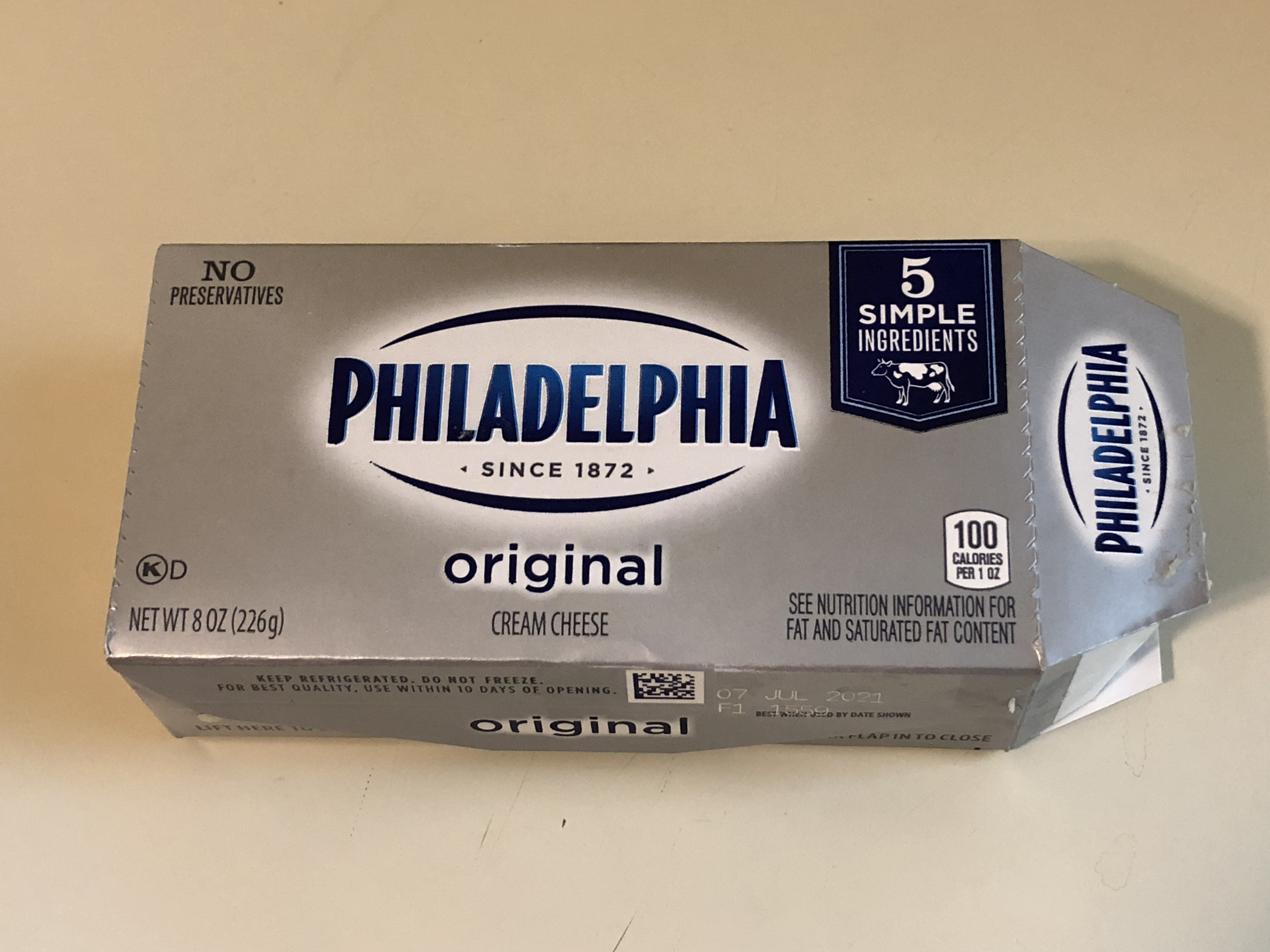
- Product type: Cream cheese
- Current owner: Kraft Heinz, Mondelez International
- Country: United States
- Introduced: 1872; 154 years ago
- Website: Kraft Heinz; Mondelez International

Philadelphia Cream Cheese is an American brand of cream cheese. It is one of the best selling brands of cream cheese worldwide, first produced in 1872, and currently owned by Kraft Heinz and Mondelez International.

== Origin ==
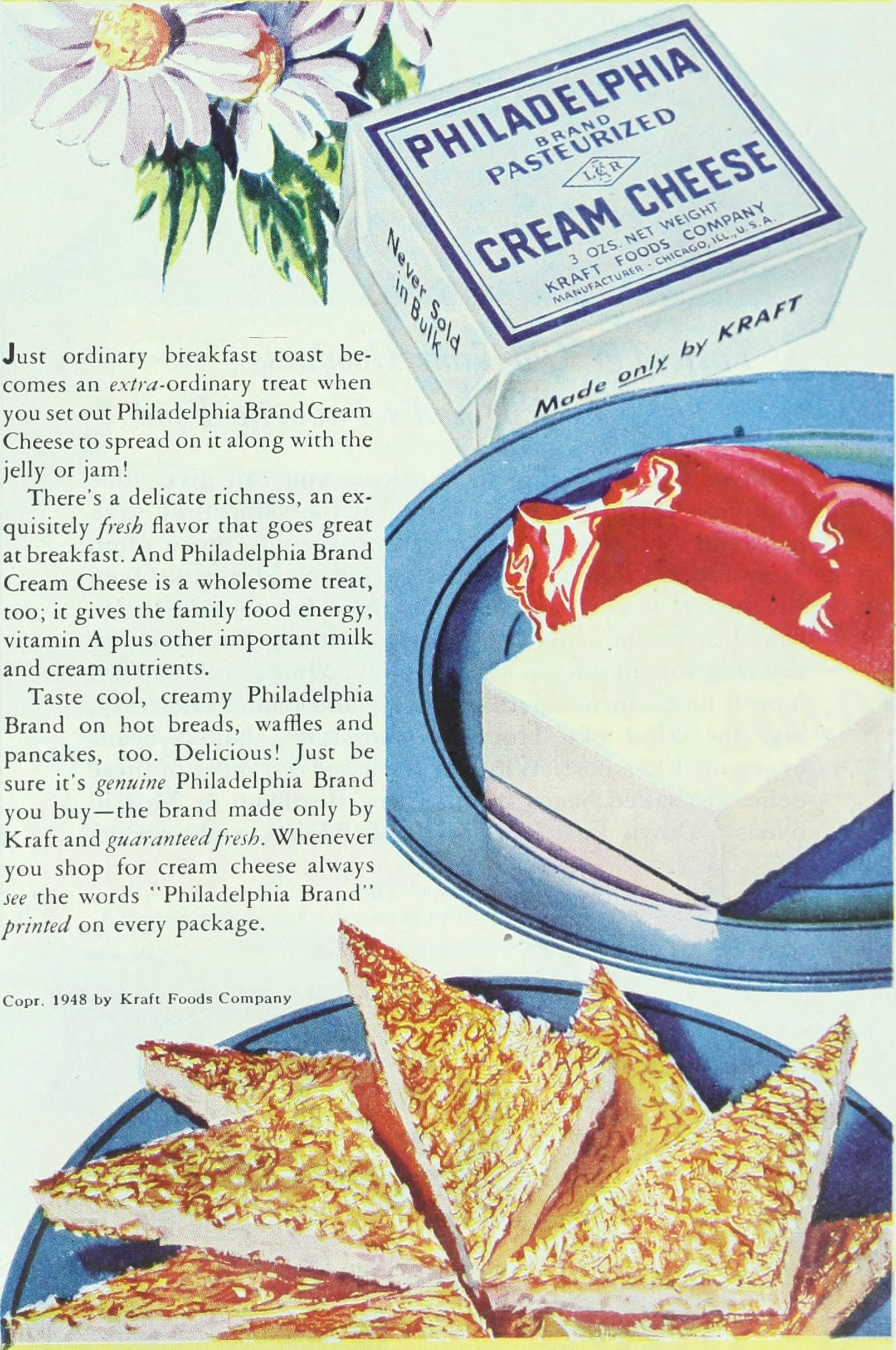
A 1948 advertisement for Philadelphia

Despite its name, Philadelphia Cream Cheese was invented in New York State, not Philadelphia. In 1872, William Lawrence, a dairyman from Chester, New York, attempted to make Neufchâtel, a soft cheese that was popular in Europe at the time. Instead he accidentally added an excessive amount of cream and created a richer, more spreadable cheese, which would eventually be called "cream cheese". It was not marketed as "Philadelphia Cream Cheese" until 1880. That year, Lawrence partnered with A. L. Reynolds, a cheese distributor in New York, to sell larger quantities of cream cheese. At the time, Philadelphia and its surrounding area had a reputation for high-quality dairy farms and creamier cheese products, so they decided to use the name "Philadelphia" on the foil-wrapped blocks of their cream cheese. The company went through some changes over the years and the trademarked Philadelphia name was sold to the Phenix Cheese Company in South Edmeston, New York. In 1928, Phenix merged with Kraft to form the Kraft-Phenix Cheese Company. Philadelphia Cream Cheese has remained popular in households, and popular in bagel shops worldwide.

== Outside the United States ==
The brand's popularity has spread outside of the United States, and it is the most popular cream cheese brand worldwide.

In 2019, an advertisement for Philadelphia Cream Cheese that portrayed an absent-minded father was banned under a new British rule that forbade gender stereotyping on TV advertisements.

In 2023, Philadelphia became the sponsor of the Serie A for the 2023–2024 season, and in December 2024, renewed the sponsorship for the 2024–25 and 2025–26 seasons.
