= Chips Ahoy! =

Nabisco brand of chocolate chip cookie

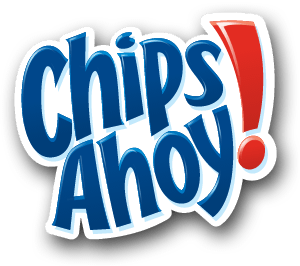

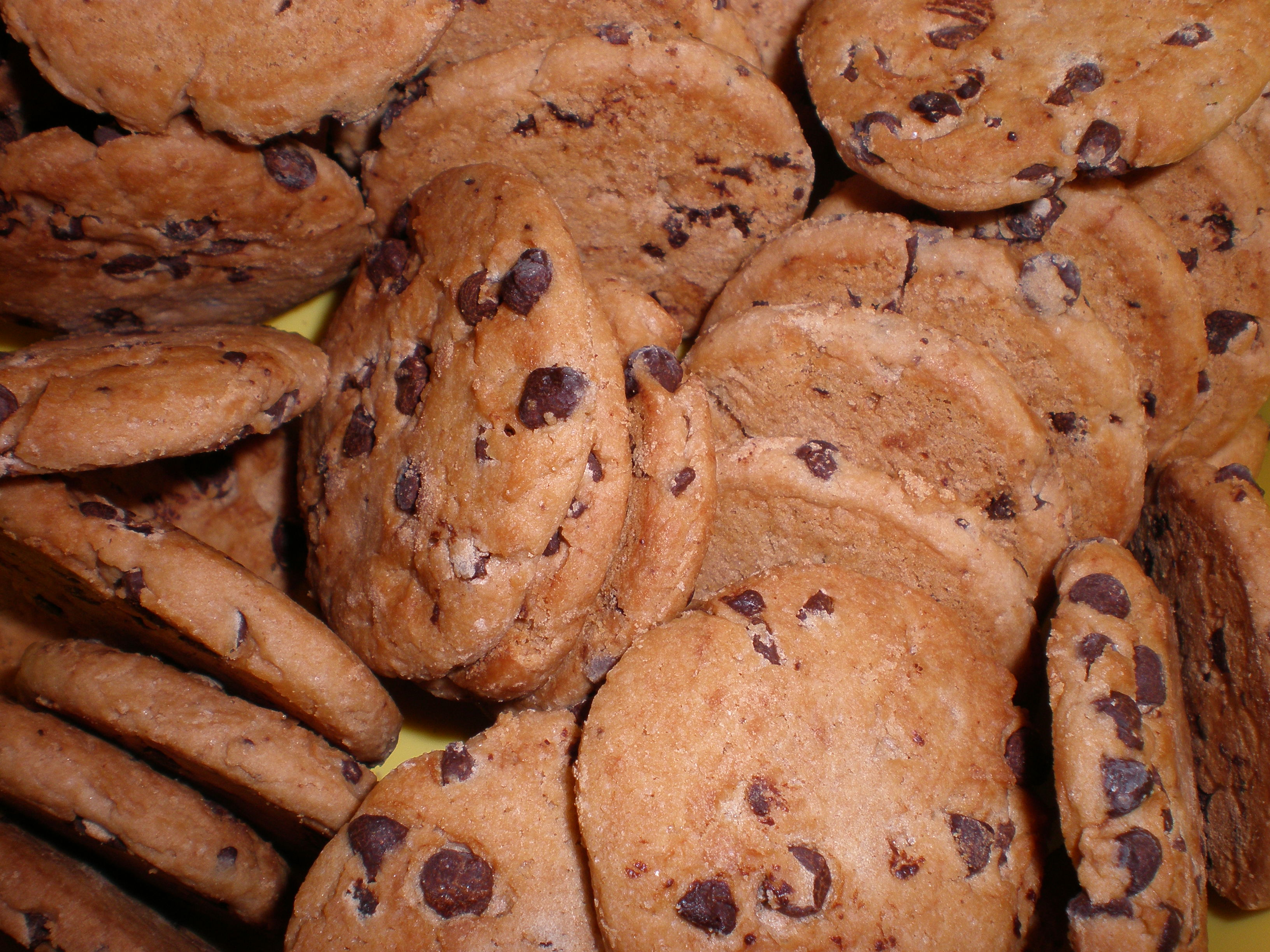
- Product type: Drop cookie
- Current owner: Mondelēz International
- Produced by: Nabisco
- Country: United States
- Introduced: 1963; 63 years ago
- Markets: Worldwide
- Tagline: List: "You cannot take a bite without hitting a chocolate chip"; "Betcha bite a chip"; "Crazy with chips!"; "There's a lotta joy in Chips Ahoy!"; “Chips Ahoy is here, here for happy“
- Website: snackworks.com/chipsahoy

Chips Ahoy! is an American chocolate chip cookie brand, baked and marketed by Nabisco, a subsidiary of Mondelez International, that debuted in 1963. Chips Ahoy! cookies are available in different variations such as, original, reduced-fat, chunky, chewy, and candy-blasts; each can be identified by variations in the color of the package. For example, Chips Ahoy! original has blue color packaging, while Chips Ahoy chewy has a red packaging.

In Malaysia, the brand was sold under the name Chips More!. In some regions of Latin America, it is sold under the name Pepitos!.

== Etymology ==
The name is a reference to the nautical term, "Ships Ahoy!" The actual reason for the naming is unclear.

The pun had been used prominently twice before:

- Chapter 15 of The Uncommercial Traveller, by Charles Dickens: Dickens relays a childhood tale of a shipwright, named Chips, who is taunted by a diabolical talking rat who predicts the sinking of Chips's ship: "Chips ahoy! Old boy! We've pretty well eat them too, and we'll drown the crew, and will eat them too!"
- Chips Ahoy (1956): an American animated theatrical short featuring chipmunks.

== History ==
Debuting in 1963, Chips Ahoy! is widely sold in the United States, Latin America (where its name in some countries is "Choco Chips", "Chips More!"), South Africa, Canada, India, Spain, Portugal, China, Indonesia, Taiwan, Mauritius, United Kingdom and many more regions. It is marketed in varieties of 1 ounce (28 g) mini-sized cookie packages to around 48 ounces (1,400 g) packages of standard-sized cookies. It is the third best-selling cookie in the United States after Oreo, also a Nabisco-branded cookie, with an average of US$619.4 million in sales per year. By the 1980s, several different varieties of the cookie snack were being baked and shipped to grocery stores: chewy, sprinkled, and striped.

In Indonesia, Chips Ahoy! was initially available from 1995 until 2005 and relaunched in September 2015, and was later discontinued in that country in 2018.

== Advertising campaigns ==
In the 1960s and early 1970s, Chips Ahoy bags featured comic strips of "Cookie Man", a superhero character who subdued various cookie-devouring creatures, such as Fruit Fly or Big Wig. His alter-ego was Mort Meek, who was always seen "counting the 16 chips" in his Chips Ahoy cookie when he was attacked by one of the creatures, at which point he slipped into a phone booth, locker room, restroom, etc., to become Cookie Man and finish off the villain in a Bruce Wayne/Batman vein. These characters were also the subject of Chips Ahoy's concurrent TV commercial campaign; and were both played by the same actor. In the early 1980s, children played 1940s-style newspaper reporters interested in "the 16 chips story" on the brand's commercials. For a time in the mid-1990s, advertising labeled Chips Ahoy as being, "1,000 chips delicious!", the acquired theme song for most of Chips Ahoy's commercials during its most popular time in the 1990s was a portion of the song "Sing, Sing, Sing" by Benny Goodman's jazz band in the 1930s. From 2001 to 2010, Chips Ahoy's mascots were the stop-motion animated "Cookie Guys" with one of their commercials having them drive a red convertible, singing the song "Don't You Want Me" by The Human League, driving past a Chips Ahoy sign. In 2010, the Cookie Guys were replaced by a live-action campaign on the theme of "joy" in which it is demonstrated that the simple act of opening a bag of Chips Ahoy brand cookies induces feelings of delight and exultation to the degree that one is affected with "happy feet," and begins dancing. In 2014, Chips Ahoy made its appearance to the UK and Ireland in two flavors, Popcorn Candy Chip and Crispy Choco Caramel. NYtimes.com (Mondelez). Mondelez, formerly Nabisco (RJR Nabisco 1985-2001), has litigated against Aldi, accusing the German grocery chain of "blatantly" copying its work, including the packaging of different types of cookies. Nutter Butter, Chips Ahoy, and Oreo, are the brands in question, which have "counterparts" sold at Aldi called "Peanut Butter Creme", "Vanilla Wafers", "Benton's Chocolate Chip Cookies", and "Benton's Original Sandwich Cookies." (2025 by D.P.M.)

== See also ==
- List of cookies
