= Ritz Crackers =

Brand name of snack cracker by Nabisco

Ritz
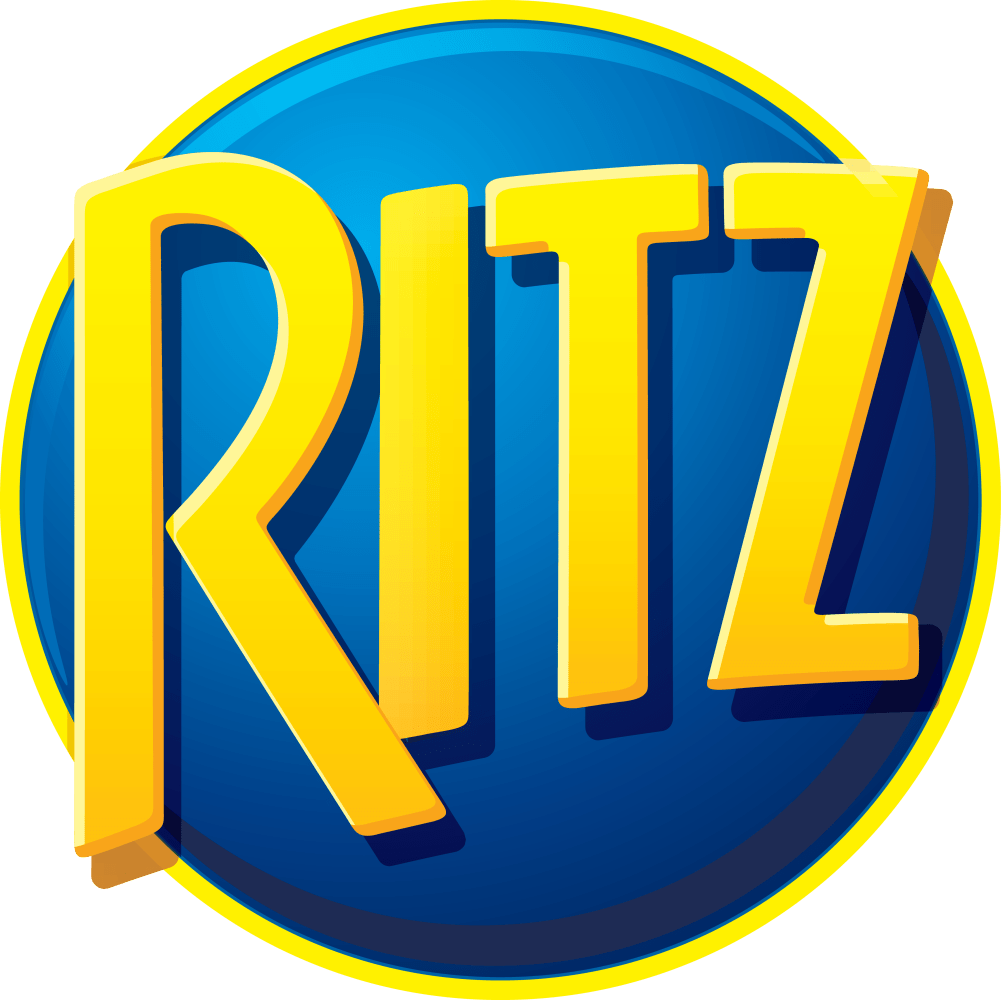

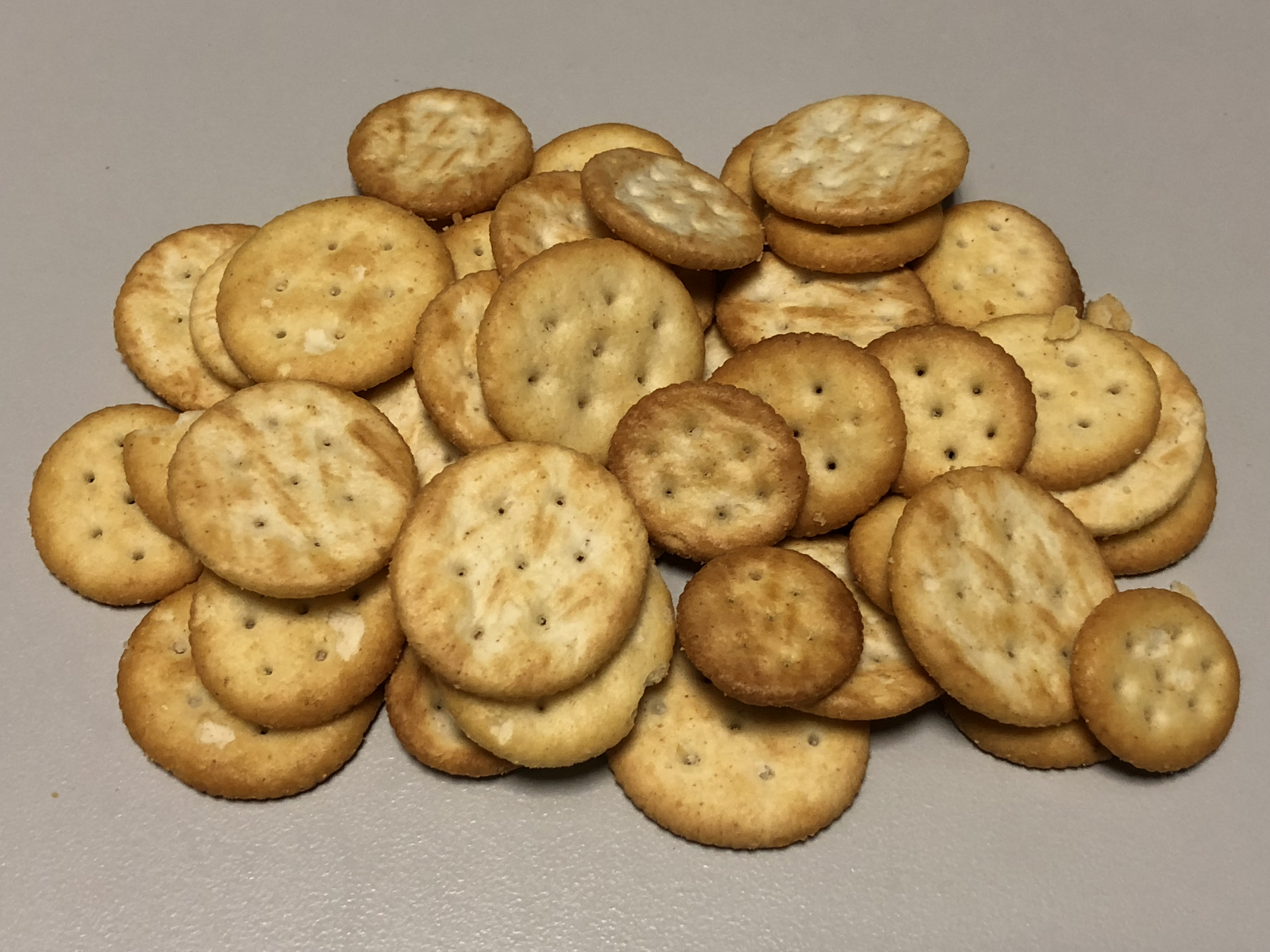
- Product type: Crackers
- Current owner: Mondelez International
- Country: United States
- Introduced: 1934; 92 years ago
- Markets: Worldwide
- Website: ritzcrackers.com

Ritz Crackers is a brand of snack cracker introduced by Nabisco in 1934. The original style crackers are disc-shaped, lightly salted, and approximately 46 millimetres (1.8 in) in diameter. Each cracker has seven perforations and a finely scalloped edge. Today, the Ritz cracker brand is owned by Mondelēz International.

A single serving of the original cracker (about 5 crackers or 15 grams) provides 330 kilojoules (79 kilocalories) of food energy, 1 gram of protein, and 4 grams of fat; the whole wheat variety provides 290 kJ (70 kcal) and 2.5 grams of fat.

== History ==
In the early 1900s, the Jackson Cracker company of Jackson, Michigan, developed a small, round cracker called the Jaxon. The company was bought by Nabisco in 1919. Nabisco introduced the Ritz Cracker in 1934. Looking to compete with the similar Hi Ho cracker made by their competitor Sunshine Biscuits, they tasked an employee, Sydney Stern, to create a name and a marketing plan. Stern chose the name 'Ritz', which appealed to individuals enduring the privations of the Great Depression by offering them "a bite of the good life". He also designed the blue circle/yellow lettering logo design, inspired by the round label inside his hat.

Beyond the branding, the design of the crackers themselves plays a functional role. The seven holes punched into each cracker allow steam to escape during baking, preventing air pockets and ensuring a uniform and consistent texture, without becoming overly crispy or flaky.

In 2011, Ritz was identified in a YouGov poll as the "best perceived snack brand" among American consumers.

A cartoon drawing of a box of Ritz Crackers can be seen in Mickey's Surprise Party (1939), an animated theatrical advertisement/cartoon short produced by Walt Disney Productions for Nabisco.

== Europe ==
Ritz Crackers varieties include Original, Peanut Butter, Roasted Vegetable, Honey Wheat, Garlic Butter, Bacon, Sour Cream and Onion, Reduced Fat, Gluten-free, Cheddar, Hint of Salt, Dill Pickle, Salt and Vinegar, Whole Wheat, Everything, and Ritz Fresh Stacks.

A 42-gram "fresh stack" sleeve typically consists of 13 crackers, and contains 220 calories. A standard 126-gram sleeve consists of 32 crackers, and contains 512 calories.

== International ==
Ritz Crackers are available in the United Kingdom and Ireland in three varieties: Original and Cheese flavour, which were sold in 200 g boxes, and Ritz Cheese Sandwich (a cheese spread sandwiched between two Ritz Crackers), available in 125 g roll packs and 33 g snack packs. They are available as mini-crackers in 25g multi-packs.

== Controversy ==
In May 2024, 200 g boxes were replaced with 150 g boxes but the price remained the same. A BBC report cited this as an example of shrinkflation.

== See also ==
- List of crackers
