= Lacta (Brazilian company) =

Brazilian confectionery company

- Brazilian Lacta milk chocolate packaging and logo
- Product type: Confectionery
- Current owner: Mondelez International
- Country: Brazil
- Website: lacta.com.br

Lacta is a Brazilian chocolate and confectionery maker, founded in São Paulo in 1912 as Société Anonyme des Chocolats Suisses. In 1996, Lacta was purchased by Philip Morris and integrated into its Kraft Foods Division.

Lacta is currently owned and distributed in Brazil by Mondelez International. In August 2012, Kraft announced that it would split the business in two. The new Mondelez would house the candy business, valued at $31 billion, bringing together global brands such as Cadbury (chocolates) and Ritz (cookies). Another company would keep the Kraft Foods logo and would be responsible for the current $17 billion relating to brands sold in U.S. supermarkets, such as Kraft cheeses.

== Products ==
- Sonho de Valsa
