= Mondelez International =

American multinational food and beverage corporation

Mondelez International, Inc.

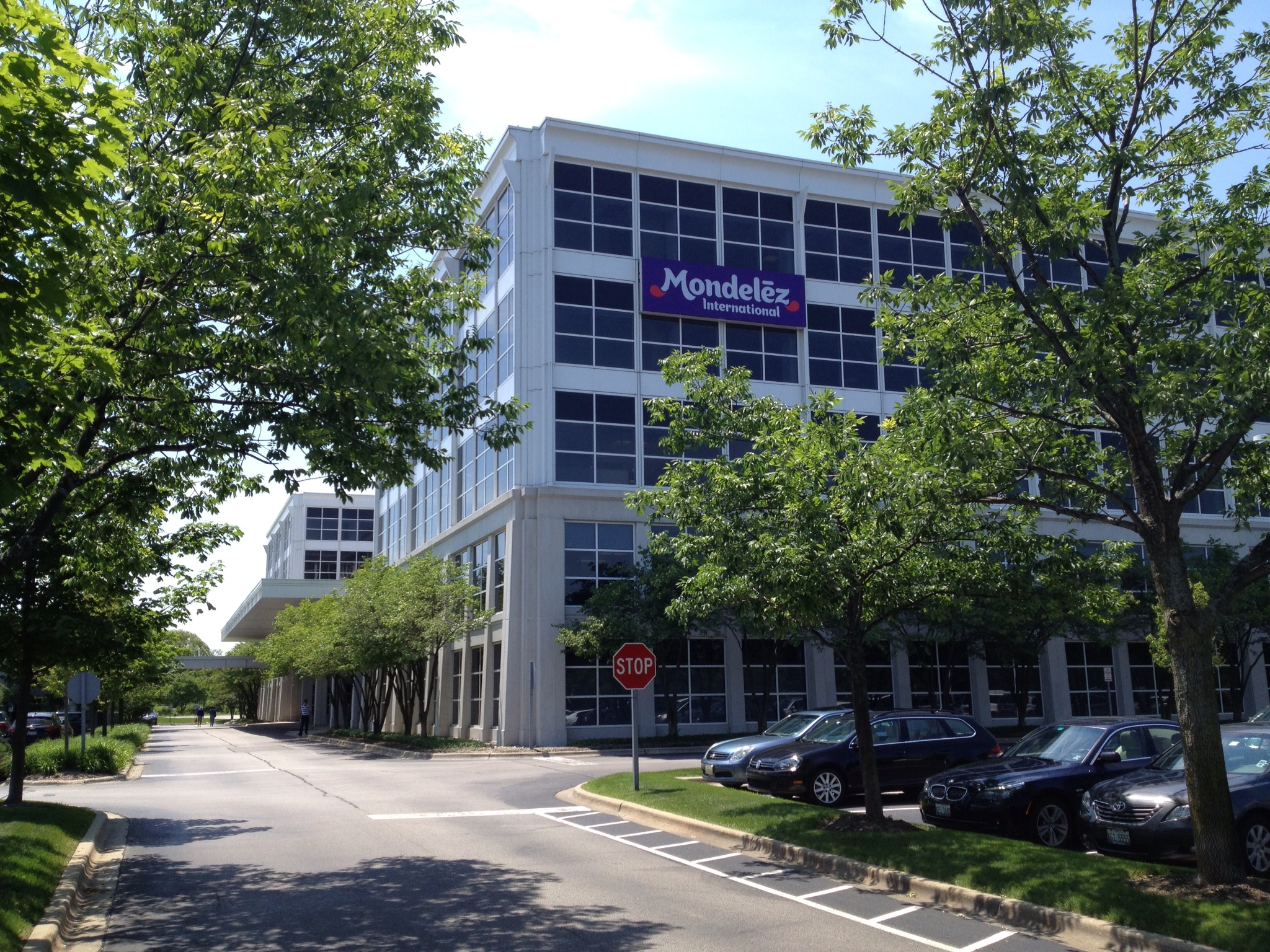
- Former Mondelez headquarters in Deerfield, Illinois
- Trade name: Mondelez International
- Type: Public
- Traded as: Nasdaq: MDLZ (Class A); Nasdaq-100 component; S&P 100 component; S&P 500 component
- ISIN: US6092071058
- Industry: Food; Beverage
- Predecessor: Kraft Foods Inc.
- Founded: December 10, 1923; 102 years ago (National Dairy Foods Co.); October 1, 2012; 14 years ago (Mondelez)
- Founders: Edward E. Rieck; Thomas H. McInnerney
- Headquarters: Chicago, Illinois, U.S.
- Area served: Worldwide
- Key people: Dirk Van de Put (chairman and CEO)
- Products: Confectionery
- Brands: List of Mondelez International brands
- Services: N/A
- Revenue: ▲US$38.5 billion (2025)
- Operating income: ▼US$3.55 billion (2025)
- Net income: ▼US$2.45 billion (2025)
- Total assets: ▲US$71.5 billion (2025)
- Total equity: ▼US$25.8 billion (2025)
- Number of employees: 91,000 (2025)
- Divisions: Mondelez Canada
- Subsidiaries: Cadbury; Clif Bar & Company; Nabisco
- Website: mondelezinternational.com

Mondelez International, Inc. (stylized as Mondelēz; /ˌmɒndəˈliːz/ MON-də-LEEZ) is an American multinational confectionery, food, holding, beverage, and snack food company based in Chicago. Mondelez has an annual revenue of about $38.5 billion and operates in approximately 160 countries. It ranked No. 108 in the 2021 Fortune 500 list of the largest United States corporations by total revenue.

The company has its origins as Kraft Foods Inc., which was founded in Chicago in 1923. The present enterprise has operated since 2012 when Kraft Foods Inc. was renamed Mondelez and retained its snack food business, while its North American grocery business was spun off to a new company called Kraft Foods Group, which three years later merged with Heinz to form Kraft Heinz. The name Mondelez is derived from the Latin word mundus ("world") and delez, a derivative of the word "delicious".

Mondelez manufactures chocolate, cookies, biscuits, gum, confectionery, and powdered beverages. Mondelez International's portfolio includes several billion-dollar components, among them cookie, cracker, and candy brands TUC, Nabisco (manufacturers of Belvita, Chips Ahoy!, Oreo, Ritz, Triscuit, Wheat Thins, etc.), LU, Sour Patch Kids, Barny, and Peek Freans; chocolate brands Milka, Côte d'Or, Toblerone, Cadbury, Green & Black's, Freia, Marabou, and Fry's; gum and cough drop brands, Halls, Stride, and Clorets; as well as Tate's Bake Shop cookies, Philadelphia Cream Cheese, and powdered beverage brand Tang.

Mondelez Canada holds the rights to Christie Brown and Company, which consists of brands such as Mr. Christie, Triscuits, and Dad's Cookies. Its head office is in Toronto, Ontario, with operations in Brampton and Hamilton, Ontario, and Montreal, Québec.

== History ==
=== Kraft ===
Mondelez International is rooted in the National Dairy Products Corporation (National Dairy), which was founded on December 10, 1923, by Edward E. Rieck and Thomas H. McInnerney. The firm was initially set up to execute on a rollup strategy in the fragmented United States ice cream industry.

In 1924, Kraft Cheese Company was founded and was listed on the Chicago Stock Exchange.

In 1930, National Dairy acquired Kraft Phenix. After the acquisition, the combined company retained the National Dairy name and management, though the Kraft Phenix side of the company continued to operate largely independently. The company then changed its name to Kraftco Corporation in 1969, and was renamed again to Kraft Inc. in 1976. After its acquisition by Phillip Morris and the merger with General Foods Corporation in 1989, Kraft Inc. was renamed to Kraft Foods Inc. in 1995. Altria (the former Phillip Morris) sold its stake in 2007.

On September 7, 2009, Kraft made a hostile £10.2 billion takeover bid for the British confectionery group Cadbury, makers of Dairy Milk and Bournville chocolate. On November 9, the company's bid (then £9.8 billion) was rejected by Cadbury, which called it a "derisory" offer. Kraft upped its offer on December 4. It had significant political and public opposition in the United Kingdom and abroad, leading to a call for the government to implement economic protectionism in large-company takeovers. On January 19, 2010, Cadbury approved a revised offer from Kraft which valued the company at £11.5 billion ($19.5 billion). Some funds for the takeover were provided by the Royal Bank of Scotland.

Cadbury sales were flat after Kraft's acquisition. Despite the Cadbury takeover helping to boost overall sales by 30 percent, Kraft's net profit for the fourth quarter fell 24 percent (to $540 million) due to costs associated with integrating the UK business after the acquisition. Kraft spent $1.3 billion on integration to achieve an estimated $675 million in annual savings by the end of 2012. Kraft increased prices to offset rising commodity costs for corn, sugar, and cocoa in North America and Europe. According to CEO Irene Rosenfeld, "We expect it will remain weak for the foreseeable future." Taking into account integration costs, the acquisition reduced Kraft's earnings per share by about 33% immediately after the Cadbury purchase.

=== Mondelez International ===
In August 2011, Kraft Foods announced plans to split into two publicly traded companies, an international snack-food company and a North American grocery company.

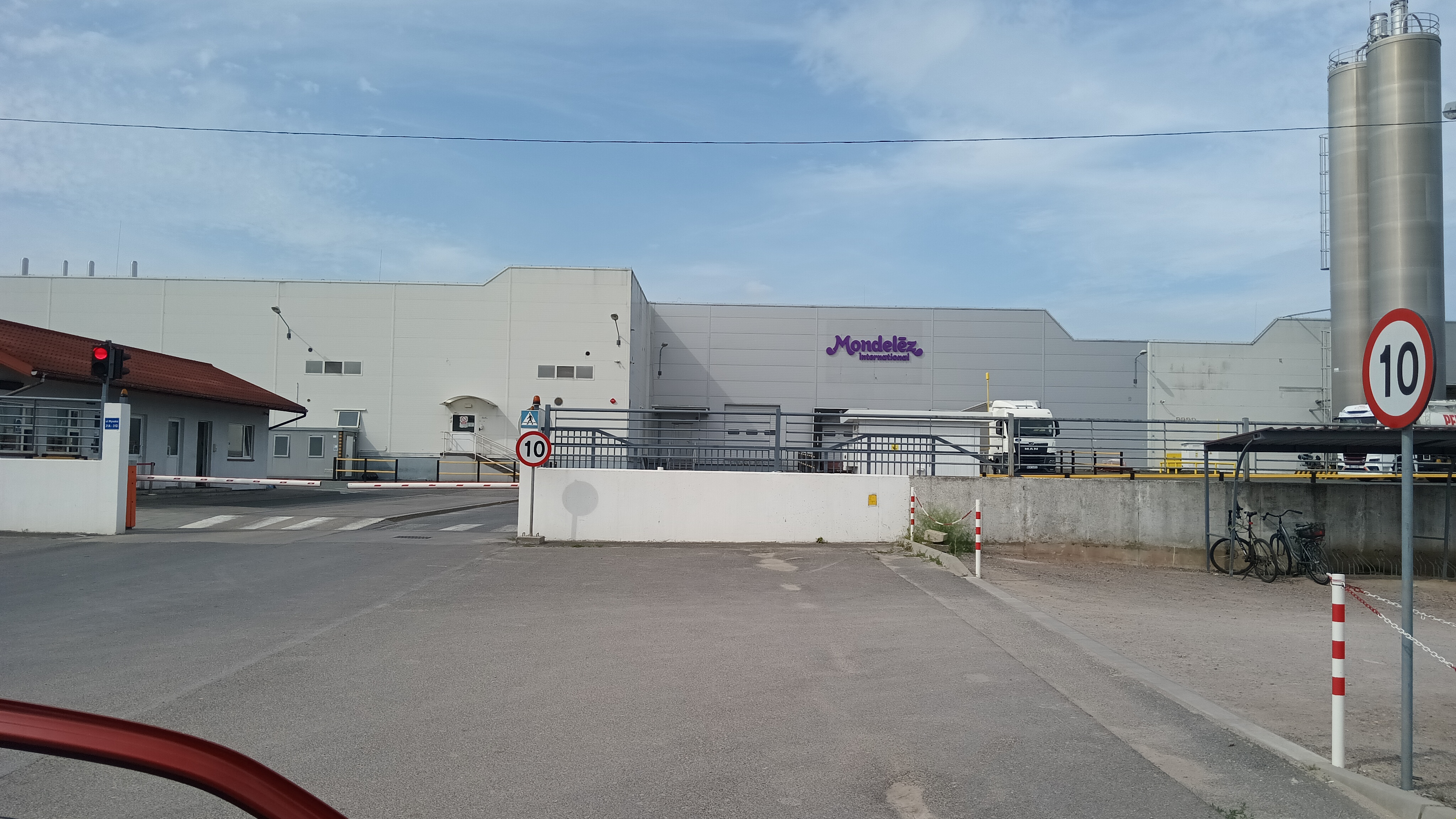
Mondelēz factory in Tomaszów Mazowiecki, Poland

The snack-food company, called Mondelez International, would be the legal successor of the old Kraft Foods, while the grocery company would be a new company, Kraft Foods Group. The split was completed in October 2012. It was structured so that Kraft Foods changed its name to Mondelez International and spun off Kraft Foods Group as a new publicly traded company. Kraft Foods Group later merged with Heinz to become Kraft Heinz.

In 2014, the company announced a merger of its coffee business with the Dutch firm Douwe Egberts. The name of the newly merged company would be Jacobs Douwe Egberts (now JDE Peet's). The merger was confirmed on May 6, 2014, and completed on July 2, 2015.

In April 2015, the U.S. Commodity Futures Trading Commission (CFTC) alleged that Mondelez International and its former subsidiary, Mondelez Global, bought $90 million (£61 million) of wheat futures with no intention of taking delivery. According to the CFTC, the purchase raised the price of the commodity and earned the company $5.4 million.

In January 2016, Mondelez announced that it would source 100% cage-free eggs globally by 2025.

On June 30, 2016, Mondelez made a $23 billion offer to buy its smaller rival, Hershey. The half-cash, half-stock deal valued Hershey stock at $107 a share. Hershey's board, however, unanimously rejected the offer. In 2016, Terry's was one of a number of brands acquired by Eurazeo from Mondelēz, and it subsequently became part of Carambar & Co.

In January 2017, the company sold the Australian grocery business, including Vegemite, to Bega Cheese.

In August 2017, it was announced that Dirk Van de Put, Belgian CEO of McCain Foods, would succeed Irene Rosenfeld as CEO in November 2017.

In October 2017, The company sold most of its sauce business in Europe (Primarily Kraft-branded condiments and Bull's-Eye Barbecue Sauce in Germany) to Kraft Heinz as a result of Mondelez's licence to use the Kraft name expiring. As a result, Kraft Heinz got the rights to use the Kraft trademark in Europe again, but this excludes Mondelez's European grocery business and the ownership for Miracle Whip in Germany and Philadelphia Cream Cheese in Europe.

On May 6, 2018, Mondelez agreed to buy cookie maker Tate's Bake Shop for approximately $500 million. The acquisition was completed on June 7, 2018.

On June 19, 2019, Mondelez agreed to acquire a majority interest in Perfect Snacks, owner of refrigerated protein bar Perfect Bar. The acquisition was completed on July 16.

On February 25, 2020, Mondelez announced that it was acquiring a majority stake in Toronto-based Give & Go, a maker of two-bite brownies. The acquisition was completed on April 3, 2020.

In January 2021, Mondelez announced that it had bought Hu Master Holdings for more than $250 million.

On May 26, 2021, Mondelez announced an agreement to acquire Greek snack company Chipita S.A., a high-growth key player in the Central and Eastern European croissants and baked snacks category. On January 3, 2022, Mondelez announced that the acquisition was complete.

In May 2022, it was announced Mondelez had acquired Grupo Bimbo's confectionery business, Ricolino, for approximately US$1.3 billion.

On May 10, 2022, Mondelez announced that it would sell its gum business, including Trident and Dentyne, in developed markets including North America and parts of Europe, as well as the entire Halls cough drop business, these businesses used to be owned by their former owner Warner Lambert.

In June 2022, Mondelez announced that it would be acquiring Clif Bar for $2.9 billion. Through the acquisition, Mondelez will obtain Clif, Luna, and Clif Bar Kids as a part of its portfolio.

On December 19, 2022, Mondelez announced that it was selling its North American and European gum business, including the Trident, Dentyne, Chiclets and Bubblicious brands, to Perfetti Van Melle, the makers of Mentos, however Mondelez retained the Latin American, African, Asian, And Australian gum business. The deal closed on October 2, 2023.

== Corporate affairs ==
The headquarters is located in Fulton Market, in Chicago, Illinois. In 2020, the company announced that the headquarters was moving from suburban Deerfield, Illinois to Chicago. Mondelez' North American headquarters was then established in East Hanover, New Jersey, U.S., and a global innovation center was opened in 2023 in nearby Whippany, also in Morris County, New Jersey.

== Finances ==
For the fiscal year 2017, Mondelēz International reported earnings of US$2.922 billion, with an annual revenue of US$25.896 billion, a decline of 0.1% over the previous fiscal cycle. Mondelēz International's shares traded at over $42 per share, and its market capitalization was valued at over US$58.8 billion in October 2018. In the first quarter of 2020, due to COVID-19 lockdowns and people stocking up with sweets, the company's sales grew by 15% in North America, increasing its overall revenue by almost 3%.

Year	Revenue in mil. US$	Net income in mil. US$	Total assets in mil. US$	Price per share in US$	Employees
2005	34,113	2,632	57,628	14.42	94,000
2006	33,256	3,060	55,574	15.24	90,000
2007	35,858	2,721	67,993	16.33	103,000
2008	40,492	2,884	63,173	15.28	98,000
2009	38,754	3,021	66,714	13.68	97,000
2010	31,489	4,114	95,289	16.43	127,000
2011	35,810	3,554	93,837	19.21	126,000
2012	35,015	3,067	75,477	23.06	110,000
2013	35,299	3,915	72,515	28.09	107,000
2014	34,244	2,184	66,771	33.41	104,000
2015	29,636	7,267	62,843	38.64	99,000
2016	25,923	1,659	61,538	41.15	90,000
2017	25,896	2,922	63,109	42.46	83,000
2018	25,938	3,381	62,729	42.21	80,000
2019	25,868	3,870	64,549	51.57	80,000
2020	26,581	3,555	67,810	58.47	79,000
2021	28,720	4,300	67,092	66.31	79,000
2022	31,500	2,720	71,160	69.72	80,000
2023	36,016	4,959	71,391		
2024	36,441	4,611	68,497		90,000

== Brands ==
Mondelez International brands (formerly Kraft Foods Inc.) includes brand-name products that are developed, owned, licensed, or distributed by Mondelez International. The company's core businesses are snack foods and confectionery. In certain international territories, Kraft-branded products have been made by Mondelez under license from Kraft Heinz Company since 2012, such as Jell-O in Mexico, Dream Whip in Saudi Arabia, Kraft Cheese in Indonesia, Miracle Whip in Germany, Cheesey Pasta in the UK, Calumet Baking Powder in the Philippines, and Cheez Whiz in Mexico and the Philippines. Mondelez also has licenses to also sell other products that were previously owned (but not made) by the Kraft Heinz Company in North America through licensing deals. Such brands include Log Cabin in Mexico from Conagra Brands, the majority of their gum brands outside North America and Europe (such as Stimorol, Trident, Dentyne and Bubbaloo) from Perfetti Van Melle, Lotus Biscoff in select countries from Lotus Bakeries, Pocky in Europe from Ezaki Glico under the name Glico Mikado, and Post Cereal in Korea from Post Holdings through a joint venture.

== Controversies ==
=== Deforestation ===
In September 2017, an investigation conducted by NGO Mighty Earth found that a large amount of the cocoa used in chocolate produced by Mondelez and other major chocolate companies was grown illegally in national parks and other protected areas in Ivory Coast and Ghana. The countries are the world's two largest cocoa producers.

The report documents how in several national parks and other protected areas, 90% or more of the land mass has been converted to cocoa. Less than four percent of Ivory Coast remains densely forested, and the chocolate companies' laissez-faire approach to sourcing has driven extensive deforestation in Ghana as well. In Ivory Coast, deforestation has pushed chimpanzees into just a few small pockets, and reduced the country's elephant population from several hundred thousand to about 200–400.

In November 2018, an investigation by Greenpeace International found that 22 palm oil suppliers to Mondelez International cleared over 70,000 hectares (170,000 acres; 270 sq mi) of rainforest from 2015 to 2017. Mondelez received a 'yellow', the second of the four possible ratings on the 2022 Chocolate Scorecard for Agroforestry i.e. 'starting to implement good policies'.

A 2026 report by the guardian revealed corporate lobbying efforts by Mondelez and others to postpone and weaken the EU deforestation regulation intended to prevent illegal deforestation. Mondelez had 8 meetings with the European commission to influence and delay the law. The official implementation of the EU deforestation regulation has been delayed twice.

=== Child slavery ===
In 2021, Mondelez International was named in a class action lawsuit filed by eight former child slaves from Mali (aided by International Rights Advocates) who allege that the company aided and abetted their enslavement on cocoa plantations in Ivory Coast. The suit accused Mondelez (along with Nestlé, Cargill, Mars, Olam International, The Hershey Company, and Barry Callebaut) of knowingly engaging in forced labor, and the plaintiffs sought damages for unjust enrichment, negligent supervision, and intentional infliction of emotional distress.

As with deforestation, Mondelez is 'starting to implement good policies' according to the 2022 Chocolate Scorecard. Its Cocoa Life programme for sustainable cocoa aims to address the root causes of child labour with a holistic approach, collaborating with families, encouraging school attendance and monitoring child labour on farms. Cocoa Life farms accounted for 43% of Mondelez' cocoa needs by 2018 and the company planned to have 100% coverage with Cocoa Life by 2025.

An investigation in 2022 by Britain's Channel 4 Dispatches found children as young as ten working on farms in Ghana supplying the Cadbury's brand of Mondelēz International. The investigation went to an address on Mondelēz's Cocoa Life website in 2022 and discovered child laborers harvesting cocoa without protective clothing.

In November 2023, International Rights Advocates (on behalf of nine children) again filed a class-complaint against Cargill, Mars, and Mondelez, alleging that:

rather than honor the pledge that they made [to phase out by 2005 their use of the Worst Forms of Child Labor as defined by ILO Convention No. 182.], defendants and all of the other major chocolate companies, have done little to address the ongoing and pervasive use of child workers performing the worst forms of child labor on their sourcing plantations and have focused on misleading the public by falsely claiming their "rehabilitation" programs offer meaningful assistance to children found working on their plantations.

=== Criticism of activities in Russia during the Russo–Ukrainian War ===
After the Russian invasion of Ukraine on February 24, 2022, many international companies felt compelled to reduce or end business in the Russian Federation. Mondelez made public statements that it had "reduced all non-core activities" and stopped new investments in the country. As of March 12, 2022, Mondelez International was listed in an online spreadsheet by Yale professor Jeffrey Sonnenfeld as being among a minority of companies continuing to do business in Russia, where it generates 3.5% of annual revenue (approximately $1 billion).

On May 25, 2023, Ukraine's National Agency on Corruption Prevention (NACP) declared Mondelez International an international sponsor of war, stating that Mondelez's Russian branch increased its profit in 2022 by 303%. This has led to boycotts from consumers and companies in the Nordic countries as well as from the football associations of Denmark, Norway and Sweden. Also, some Mondelez employees in Eastern Europe have protested. This also resulted in Charles III stripping Cadbury of its royal warrant and Sweden stripping theirs of Marabou.

The chief executive of Mondelez, Dirk Van de Put, stated in February 2024 that investors "do not morally care" if the company continues to do business in Russia.

=== Anti-competitive practices ===
In May 2024, the European Commission imposed a fine on Mondelez of €337.5 million for anti-competitive practices and for abusing its dominant market position in breach of antitrust laws in the European Union (EU), including illegally blocking cross-border sales of chocolate, cookies, and coffee products between EU countries, thereby preventing retailers from sourcing products from EU countries where prices were lower.

=== Advertising ===
In July 2025 Mondelez' Milka chocolate was mocked with Foodwatch's Goldener Windbeutel award for shrinkflation.

== See also ==
- List of Mondelez International brands
