= Kraft Dinner =

Boxed macaroni and cheese mix

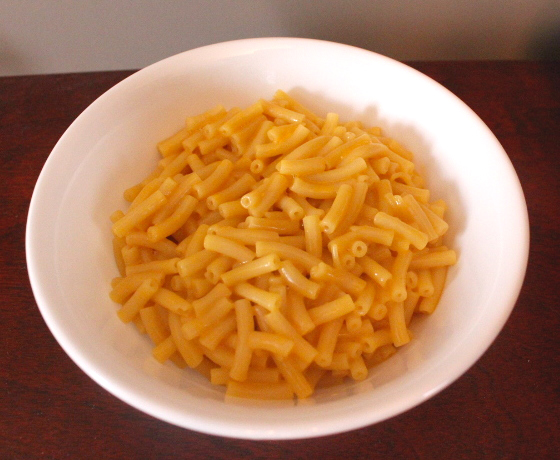
- A bowl of original recipe (aka "original flavour")
- Product type: Macaroni
- Current owner: Kraft Heinz
- Produced by: Kraft Foods
- Country: United States
- Introduced: 1936; 90 years ago
- Markets: United States, Canada, Australia, New Zealand
- Previous owners: Kraft Foods Inc. (1936–2012)
- Website: kraftmacandcheese.com

Kraft Dinner (marketed as KD in Canada; Kraft Mac & Cheese in the United States, Australia, and New Zealand; and Mac and Cheese internationally) is a nonperishable packaged macaroni and cheese mix. It is made by Kraft Foods Group (or former parent company Mondelez internationally) and traditionally cardboard-boxed with dried macaroni pasta and a packet of processed cheese powder. The product was first marketed in many U.S. states in 1936, typically for 15 cents a box (“grated cheese and macaroni--dinner for four in nine minutes”). Marketing in Canada began in late 1937. The brand is particularly popular with Canadians, who consume 55% more boxes per capita than Americans.

There are now many similar products, including private label, of nonperishable boxed macaroni and cheese. Commercially, the line has evolved, with deluxe varieties marketed with liquid processed cheese and microwavable frozen mac-and-cheese meals. The product by Kraft has added many flavour variations and formulations, including Easy Mac (now Mac & Cheese Dinner Cups), a single-serving product specifically designed for microwave ovens.

The product's innovation, at the time of the Great Depression, was to conveniently market nonperishable dried macaroni noodles together with a processed cheese powder. It is prepared by cooking the pasta and adding the cheese powder, butter (or margarine), and milk.

== History ==
The prerequisite to a shelf-stable packaged macaroni and cheese product was the invention of processed cheese, where emulsifying salts help stabilize the product, giving it a longer life. While living in Chicago, James Lewis Kraft of Fort Erie, Ontario, began to build his cheese business after winning a patent for one such method in 1916.

During the Great Depression, a St. Louis, Missouri, salesman, Grant Leslie of Dundee, Scotland, had the idea to sell macaroni pasta and cheese together as a package, so he began attaching grated cheese to boxes of pasta with a rubber band. The product was first marketed in many U.S. states in 1936, typically for 15 cents (equivalent to $3.48 in 2025) a box (“grated cheese and macaroni--dinner for four in nine minutes”). Marketing in Canada began in late 1937. The timing of the product's launch had much to do with its success: during World War II, the rationing of milk and dairy products, increased reliance on meatless meals, and more women working outside the home created a large market for the product, which was considered a hearty meal for families. Its shelf life of ten months was attractive at a time when many Canadian homes did not have refrigerators. Also, consumers could receive, for one food ration stamp, two boxes. The original box was primarily yellow. 50 million boxes were sold during the war. The box's primary colour changed to blue in 1954, later used in an advertising campaign where children were encouraged to ask for "The Blue Box".

Marye Dahnke, Kraft's resident chef, suggested reviving macaroni and cheese after Kraft was facing competition from Miracle Whip.

A version with spiral-shaped noodles debuted in 1975, while Velveeta Shells & Cheese were introduced in 1984. A single-serving variation requiring only water for preparation was introduced as Easy Mac in 1999. In 2006, the cheddar and white cheddar versions switched to organic macaroni, while Easy Mac Cups were introduced the same year. In 2007, the noodles switched to 50 percent whole grain.

Macaroni & Cheese Crackers also debuted in 2007. The crackers were discontinued in 2008, as they did not meet company targets. A sub-line, Homestyle Deluxe, was added in 2010 in three flavours: cheddar, four-cheese sauce, and Old World Italian.

Kraft Macaroni and Cheese sold in the United States used to include Yellow 5 and Yellow 6 to make the food a brighter colour. In Europe, food that contains Yellow 5 requires a warning label saying "This product may have adverse effect on activity and attention in children." In 2014, none of the European varieties were made with artificial dyes.

In November 2013, Kraft announced that new pasta shape varieties for children in the U.S. would no longer include Yellow 5 and Yellow 6, the sodium and saturated fat content would decrease, and there would be six more grams of whole grains.

In April 2015, it was announced that those changes, including the elimination of artificial preservatives, would be extended throughout the line after January 2016. Paprika, annatto, and turmeric are used for colouring. According to Kraft, the changes were a response to consumer feedback.

In 2018, Kraft-Heinz introduced the KD Shaker, which was a plastic bottle of Kraft Mac and Cheese Dinner's powdered cheese, allowing one to use the cheese powder as they wish, without needing to worry about unused pasta. The product is similar to shelf-stable Parmesan cheese powder bottle cans.

== Mascot ==
The product advertises the Cheesasaurus Rex. He was introduced in 1991, and was kept until the late-2000s and can still be seen in commercials and select boxes of Kraft products.

He is depicted in commercials as a friendly orange tyrannosaurus rex who loves all things noodle-y and is covered in cheese. He lives in Noodletown.

== In Canadian popular culture ==
Previous logo of the Canadian version

Kraft Dinner has been called a de facto national dish of Canada. Packaged in Quebec with Canadian wheat and milk, and other ingredients from Canada and the US, Canadians purchase 1.7 million of the 7 million boxes sold globally each week and eat an average of 90 million boxes of Kraft Dinner each year. The meal is the most popular grocery item in the country, where "Kraft Dinner" has an iconic status and has become a generic trademark of sorts for macaroni and cheese. It is often simply referred to, and (as of 2023) is now marketed by the initials K.D. As Kraft Dinner has a different name in Canada from the United States and other markets, the Canadian marketing and advertising platform is a made-in-Canada effort that cannot be easily adapted to the US market.

Pundit Rex Murphy wrote that "Kraft Dinner revolves in that all-but-unobtainable orbit of the Tim Hortons doughnut and the A&W Teen Burger. It is one of that great trinity of quick digestibles that have been enrolled as genuine Canadian cultural icons." Douglas Coupland wrote that "cheese plays a weirdly large dietary role in the lives of Canadians, who have a more intimate and intense relationship with Kraft food products than the citizens of any other country. This is not a shameless product plug – for some reason, Canadians and Kraft products have bonded the way Australians have bonded with Marmite [sic, recte:Vegemite], or the English with Heinz baked beans. In particular, Kraft Macaroni and Cheese, known simply as Kraft Dinner, is the biggie, probably because it so precisely laser-targets the favoured Canadian food groups: fat, sugar, starch and salt." Immigrants often mention Kraft Dinner when surveys ask for examples of Canadian food. As a measure of the product's Canadian popularity, its Facebook page, KD Battle Zone, attracted 270,000 fans, despite there being no prizes for the contest.

Canadian rock band Barenaked Ladies refer to the product in their popular song "If I Had $1000000", indicating that they would continue to eat the inexpensive foodstuff even if they were millionaires. This has often prompted fans at live concerts to throw boxes of Kraft Dinner onto the stage when the line is sung; the band has discouraged this and has urged fans to donate the boxes to their local food bank instead.

Former Prime Minister Paul Martin regularly referred to it as his favourite food, though he also confessed that he was unable to prepare it. During the same election former Prime Minister Stephen Harper stated that "I'll never be able to give my kids a billion-dollar company, but Laureen and I are saving for their education. And I have actually cooked them Kraft Dinner—I like to add wieners." Most Canadians ignore the instructions and use alternate methods of preparing the food, like adding wieners or cheese.

In the September 2012 issue of The Walrus magazine, the story "Kraft Dinner is Canada's True National Dish" by Sasha Chapman details the history of the Canadian cheese industry and Kraft's impact on it. She notably draws attention to Canada being unique in favouring a manufactured food product (made by a foreign company) as its national dish at the expense of local cheeses. Chapman's article is structured around this question, from the first page:

But what does it mean if a national dish is manufactured, formulated by scientists in a laboratory in Glenview, Illinois, and sold back to us by the second-largest food company in the world?

Kraft Dinner is a frequent staple of Canadian university student diets. Consequently, university students protesting government funding cuts and tuition hikes have often used Kraft Dinner as a prop to draw attention to their plight.

== Nutrition ==
Kraft Dinner
Nutritional value per 100 g
- Energy: 382 kcal (1,600 kJ)
- Carbohydrates: 71 g
- Sugars: 11 g
- Dietary fibre: 2 g
- Fat: 5.4 g
- Saturated: 1 g
- Trans: 0 g
- Protein: 11 g
Vitamins and minerals
Vitamins	Quantity %DV^{†}
Vitamin D	0% 0 μg
Minerals	Quantity %DV^{†}
Calcium	11% 145 mg
Iron	18% 3.3 mg
Potassium	8% 250 mg
Sodium	36% 836 mg
- ^{†}Percentages estimated using US recommendations for adults, except for potassium, which is estimated based on expert recommendation from the National Academies. Source: FoodData Central, USDA

Prepared Kraft Dinner is 71% carbohydrates, 11% protein, and 5% fat (table). In a 100 grams (3.5 ounces) reference serving, Kraft Dinner supplies 382 calories and rich contents (20% or more of the Daily Value, DV) of sodium (56% DV) and iron (25% DV), with calcium in moderate content (15% DV) (table).

== Variations ==
The product is available in a variety of compositions:

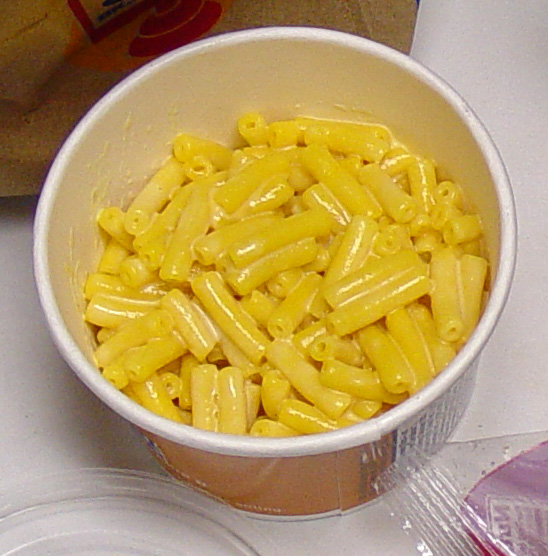
Commercial version of Kraft Macaroni and Cheese sold at Burger King

- The Original Recipe of dry macaroni pasta (roughly 172 grams) and 70 ml (approximately 42 grams) of powdered processed cheese. This category includes additional flavours of powdered cheese sauce (see Flavours and shapes).
- The Deluxe form, with the powdered processed cheese replaced with a prepared, processed cheese sauce that comes in a foil pouch (cheese sauce formerly came in a can). This allows the cheese to be applied directly to the cooked pasta without additional preparation or ingredients. The pasta also differs; elbow macaroni replaces the thin, straight macaroni supplied as part of the "Original Recipe".
- The Homestyle form is similar to the "Deluxe" form, though it provides a large size and includes seasoned breadcrumbs to apply to the macaroni and cheese. It has three flavours: cheddar cheese, four-cheese, and Old World Italian. It is marketed as being a "more premium option" for those who would not eat the "Original Recipe". This version also has the prepared, processed cheese sauce in a foil pouch. Due to the breadcrumb topping, this form has more sodium than the "Deluxe" or "Original Recipe" forms. As of 2015, this variant has been discontinued due to a lack of demand.
- Dinner Cups, formerly Kraft Easy Mac, which makes single-serving portions. This formulation is prepared in a microwave oven and is popular among college students.
- A commercial version is manufactured for restaurant distribution and is a frozen, fully prepared product designed to be heated in a microwave. The product can be found at Burger King and Applebee's restaurants.
- In the summer of 2021, Kraft Heinz released a selection of stir-in flavour boosters in the Canadian market. There are six different Kraft Dinner Flavour Boosts in the following flavours: Jalapeño, Butter Chicken, Poutine, Buffalo Wings, Ghost Pepper, and Cotton Candy. These packets are added to a prepared pot of Kraft Dinner and are designed to enhance the experience by providing a new flavour variation for the eater.

=== Kraft Dinner Smart ===
Kraft Dinner Smart (also known as KD Smart) launched as a healthy sub-brand of the Kraft Dinner brand. It represents a line of Kraft macaroni and cheese products with no artificial flavours, colours, or preservatives and added ingredients like cauliflower, oats, or flax seed blended into the noodles. It comes in four varieties.

Kraft Dinner Smart launched in Canada in March 2010 with two vegetable varieties. In June 2011, the line-up was re-launched with new packaging graphics and two new varieties (Flax Omega-3 and High Fibre).

The product is made with cheddar and is manufactured in Mount Royal, Quebec.

=== Flavours and shapes ===
The shapes come in the original tenderoni, various pop culture icons, alphabet, numbers and spirals. Organic and whole-grain versions are also available, as well as a larger format box called "family size".

== Marketing ==
The product was marketed as Kraft Dinner with the slogan "a meal for four in nine minutes for an everyday price of 19 cents." It was re-branded to Kraft Macaroni & Cheese in the United States and other countries, although the word "Dinner" still appeared in small type on the U.S. version until the 2022 rebrand, and is referred to as the “Kraft Mac & Cheese Dinner” in the product webpage for the American variant. In several markets, it goes by different names; in the United Kingdom, it is also marketed as Cheesey Pasta.

The product is heavily promoted to children in the United States on television. When advertising to younger children, the television advertisement encourages the children to ask for "The Blue Box". In 2010, Kraft launched a $50 million multi-media marketing campaign with a nostalgia theme aimed at adults to promote all varieties of Kraft Dinner. In Canada, Kraft has advertising programs intended to make the meal appealing to newly arrived immigrant groups.

There are regular promotional tie-in versions of the Kraft Dinner aimed at kids. Packages have come with pasta in the shapes of various characters popular with children, such as Looney Tunes, Super Mario Bros., and Star Wars.

In promotion of the introduction of its "Cheddar Explosion" variety of Kraft Dinner, Kraft sponsored the demolition of Texas Stadium on April 11, 2010. In its last act of 2009, the Irving, Texas city council made Kraft Macaroni and Cheese the official sponsor of the demolition. Kraft paid $75,000 to local charities and donated another $75,000 in Kraft products. A national essay contest directed at children who "have made a difference in their community" was held with the winner allowed to push the button initiating the controlled demolition. The winning essayist was 11-year-old Casey Rogers of Terrell, Texas, founder of a charity serving the homeless.

== Gallery ==
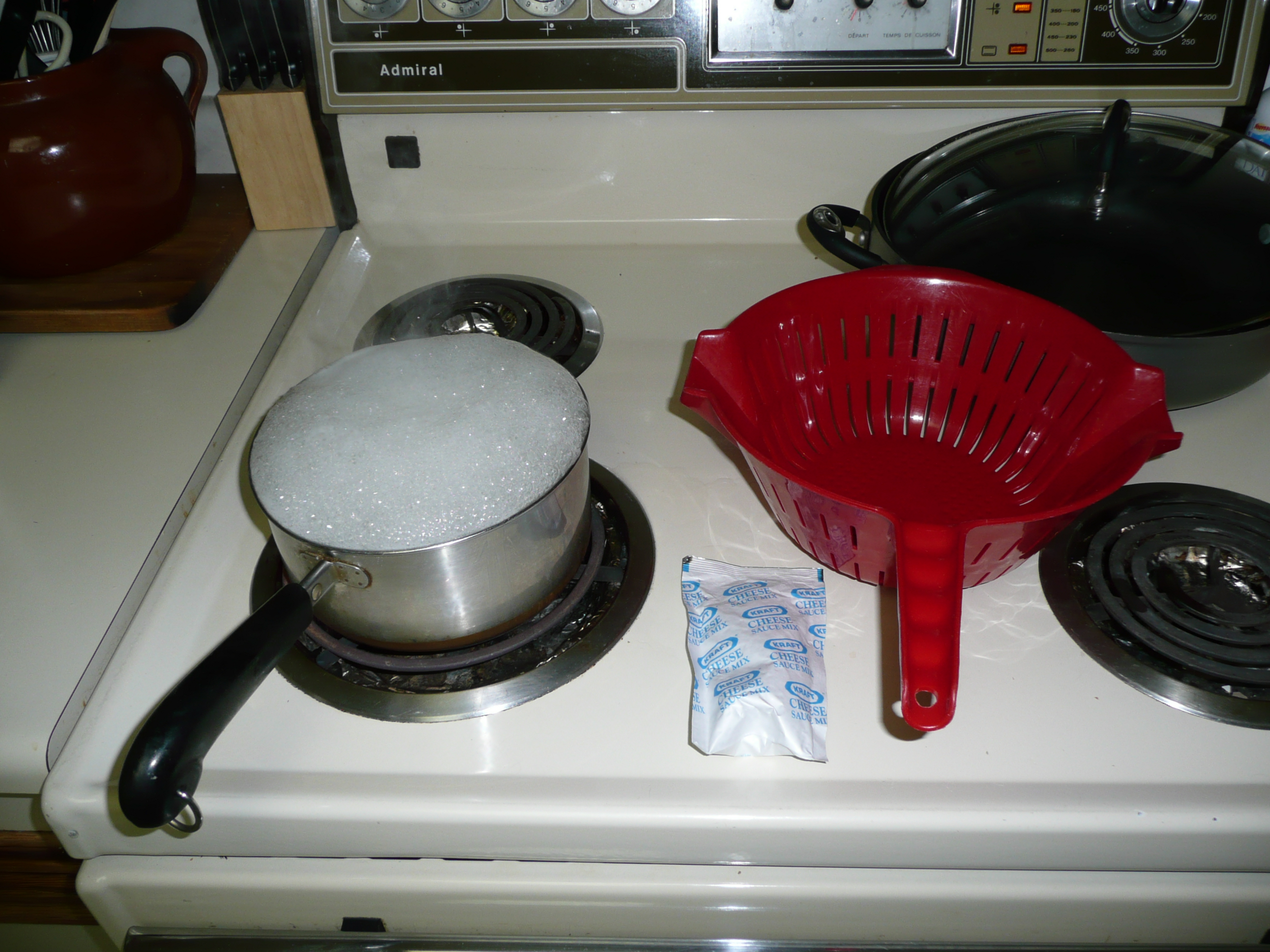
Kraft Macaroni & Cheese preparation—pot of boiling water with pasta inside, package of cheese powder (labeled "Kraft cheese sauce mix"), and colander to separate the noodles from the cooking water

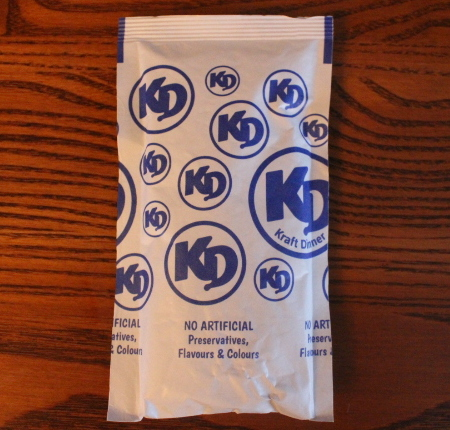
Kraft Dinner (with the KD label) is packaged with a processed cheese powder packet (Canada, 2018).

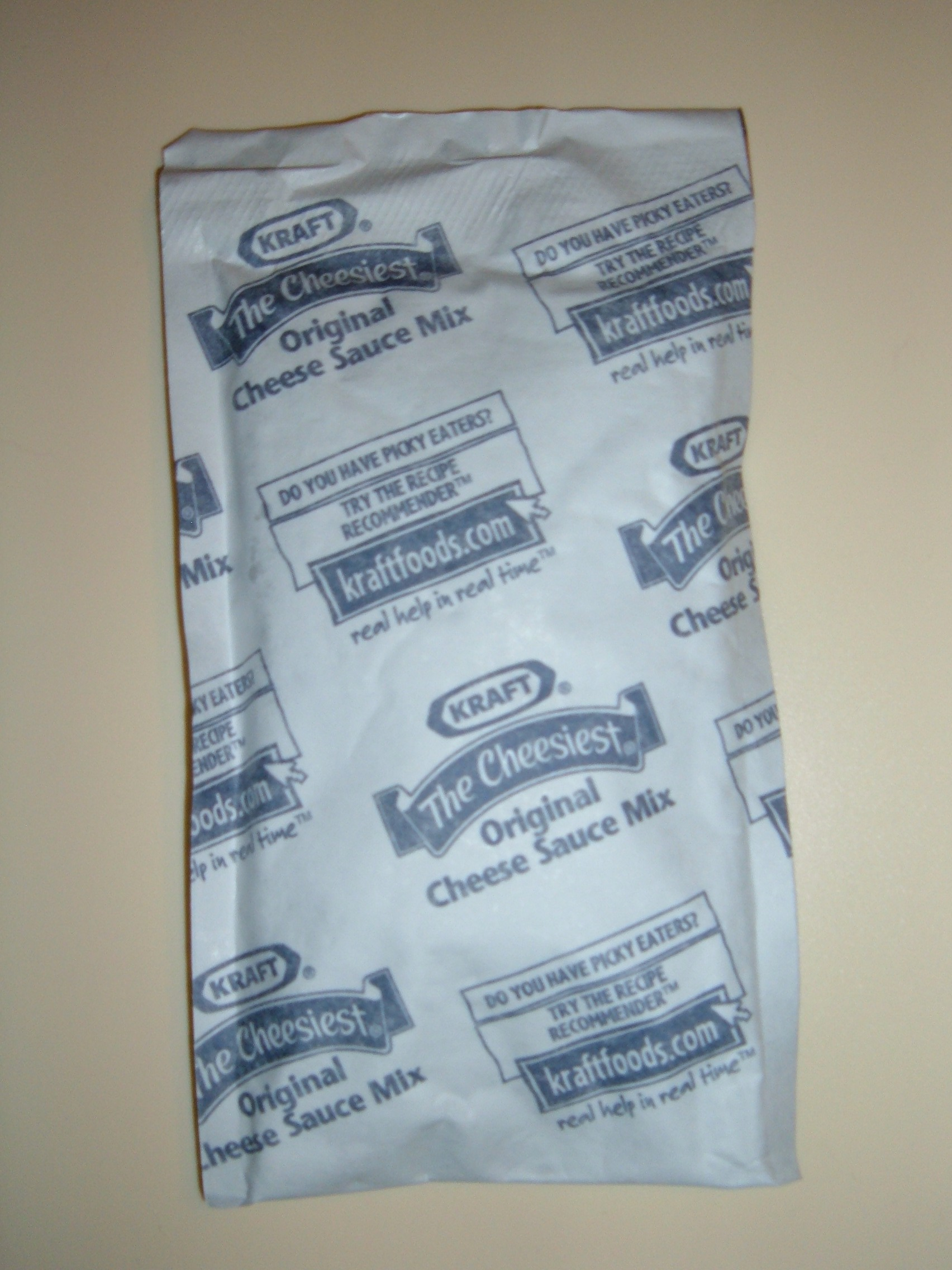
The American version of the cheese powder

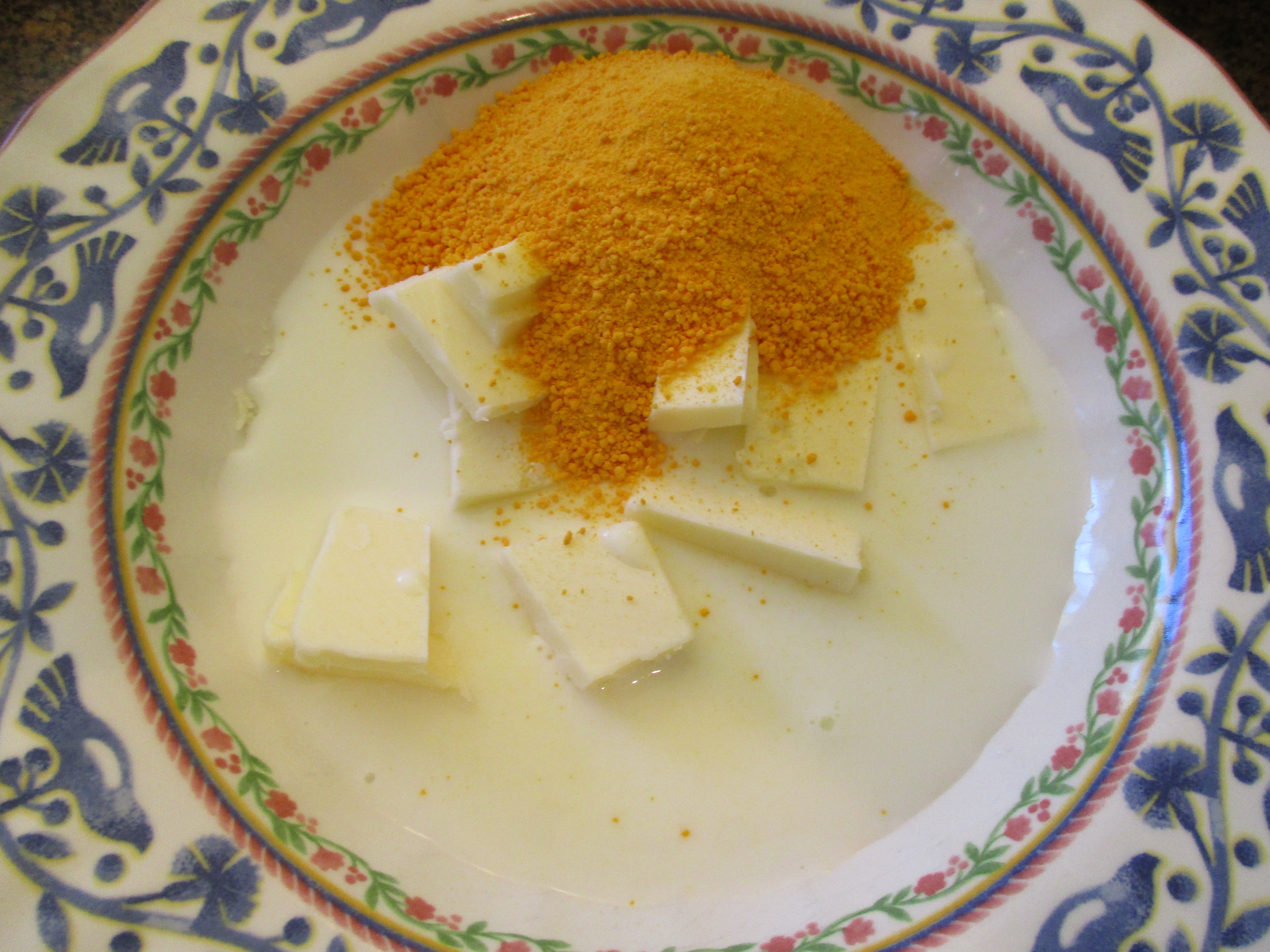
Additional ingredients are needed for a "Classic Prep" of Kraft Macaroni and Cheese—milk, butter, and cheese powder—which are added to the noodles.

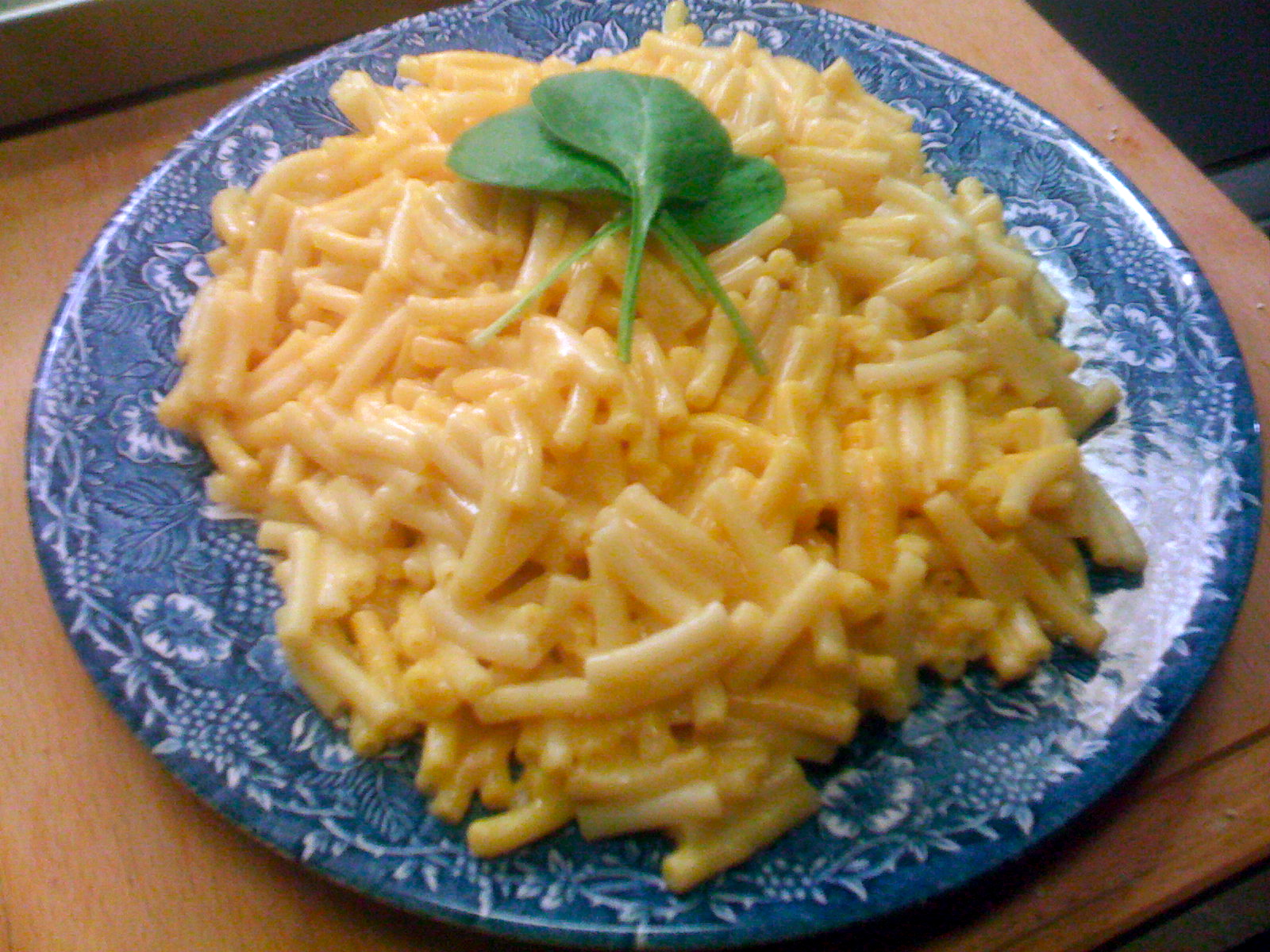
American Kraft Mac & Cheese served on a plate in Sweden, garnished with fresh spinach leaves

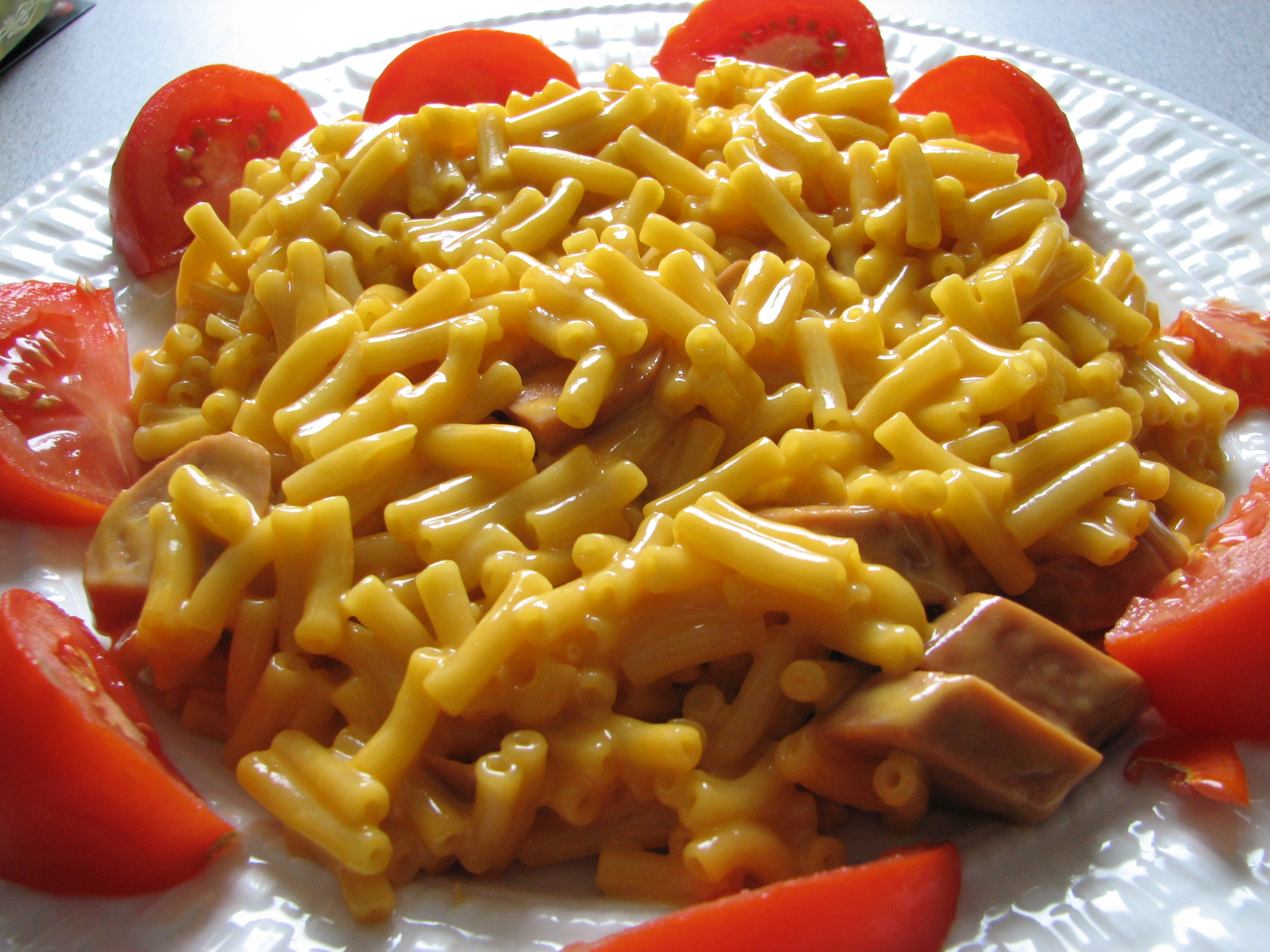
A Canadian meal—Kraft Dinner with added Cheddar that has been integrated with sliced vegetarian hot dog and fresh tomato slices

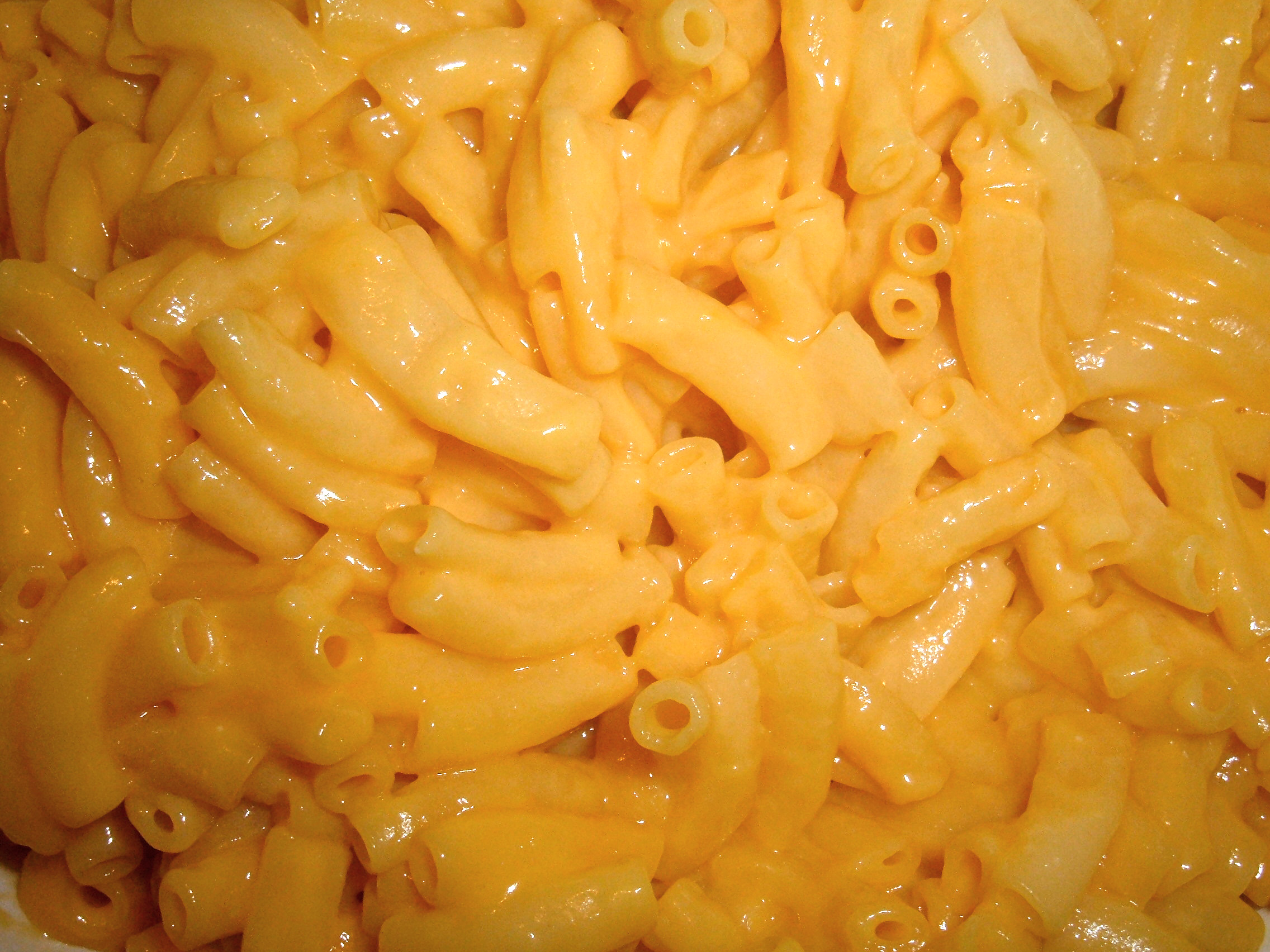
Kraft Easy Mac close-up

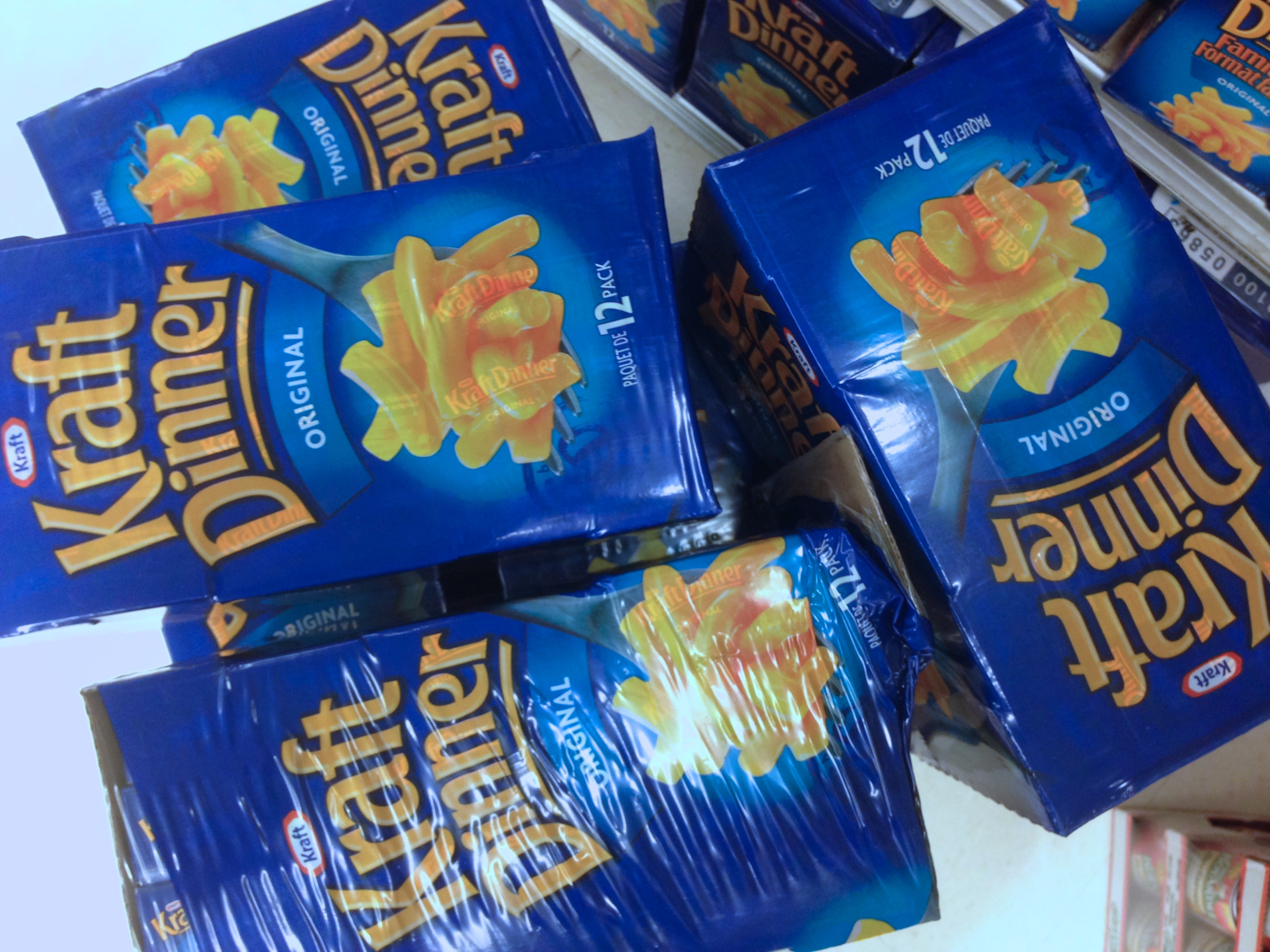
Original-flavour Kraft Dinner sold in bulk 12-pack sizes in Canada

== See also ==
- Cheez Whiz
- Hamburger Helper
- Velveeta Shells & Cheese
