= Velveeta =

Pasteurized prepared cheese product by Kraft

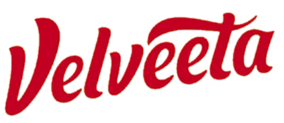

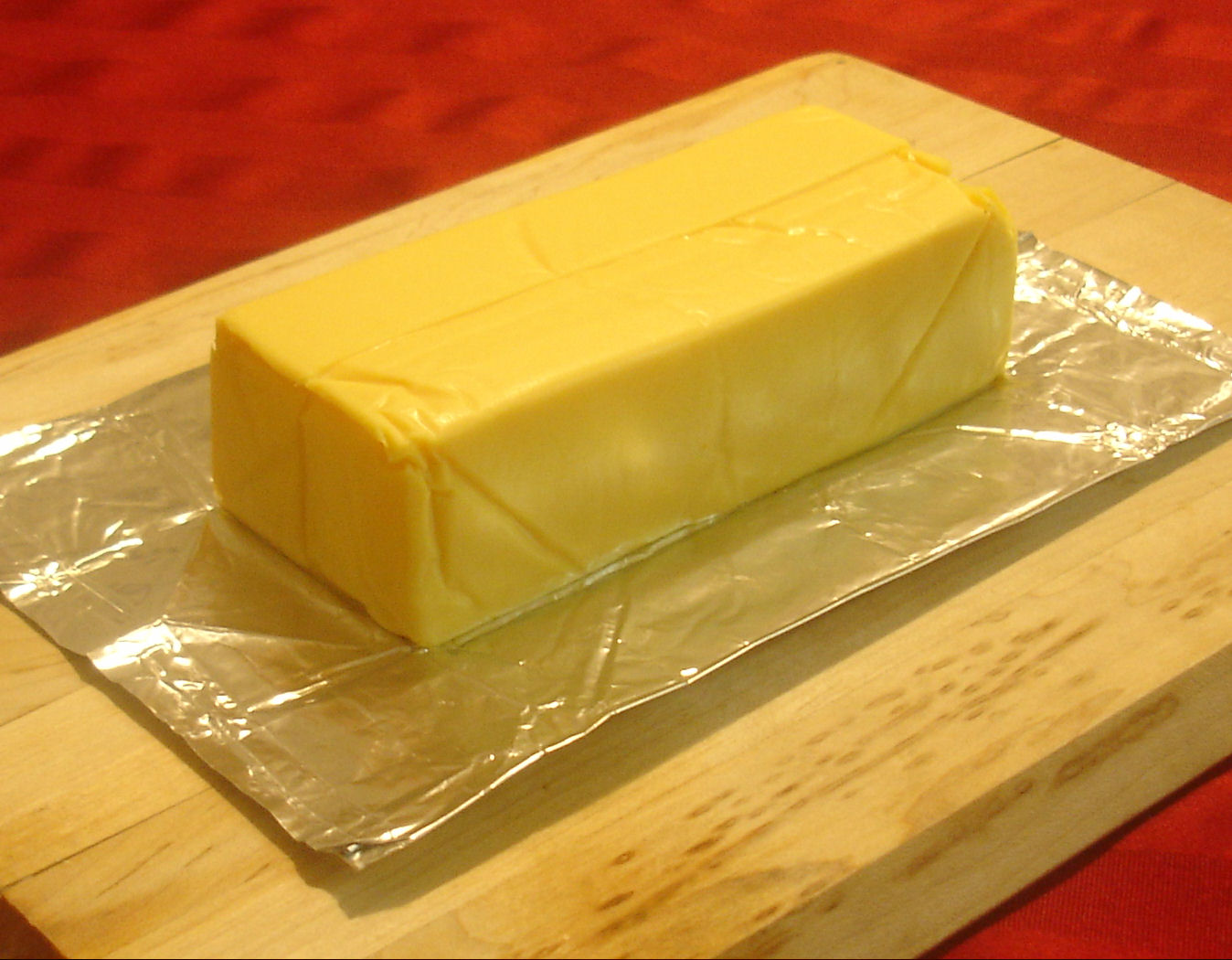
- Product type: Processed cheese
- Current owner: Kraft Heinz
- Produced by: Kraft Foods
- Country: United States
- Introduced: 1918; 108 years ago
- Markets: United States, Canada
- Previous owners: The Velveeta Cheese Company (1918–1927); Kraft Foods Inc. (1927–2012)
- Tagline: That's La Dolce Velveeta
- Website: kraftheinz.com/velveeta

Velveeta is a brand name for a processed cheese similar to American cheese. It was developed in 1918 by Emil Frey (1867–1951) of the Monroe Cheese Company in Monroe, New York. In 1923, The Velveeta Cheese Company was incorporated as a separate company. In 1925, it advertised two varieties, Swiss and American. The firm was purchased by Kraft Foods Inc. in 1927.

== History ==
In 1888, the new owners of the Monroe Cheese Co., Adolphe Tode and Ferdinand Wolfe, hired former Neuesswanders Cheese Factory’s cheesemaker Emil Frey. While they saw success with one of Frey’s creations, Liederkranz cheese, they still ultimately fell into financial problems resulting in the foreclosure of the property. In 1891, Jacob Weisl purchased the company from the Goshen Savings Bank. Weisl set up a second factory in Covington, Pennsylvania, that made mostly Swiss cheese. He had the broken pieces of cheese sent up to Monroe hoping to find a way to prevent the waste. It was during this time that Frey began taking broken pieces of cheese back to his house where he spent two years working on a process to make use of them. In 1918 he had his breakthrough, mixing cheese byproducts with the broken cheese bits to form a cheese blend that would become known as Velveeta. The name Velveeta was intended to connote a "velvety smooth" product.

On February 14, 1923, Frey incorporated a separate Velveeta company independent from the Monroe Cheese Co. In 1926, the Monroe Cheese company closed down and one year later Velveeta was sold to Kraft. The brand has since been expanded into a line of products including cheesy bites, macaroni and cheese, and cheesy skillets.

In the 1930s, Velveeta became the first cheese product to gain the American Medical Association's seal of approval. It was reformulated in 1953 as a "cheese spread"; however, as of 2002, Velveeta is labeled in the United States as a "pasteurized prepared cheese product".

== Ingredients ==
Nutritional info
- Other names: Pasteurized Recipe Cheese Product
- Source of milk: Cow
- Texture: Soft and creamy
- Fat content: 21%
- Protein content: 18%

Kraft Foods lists Velveeta's ingredients as: milk, canola oil, whey, milk protein concentrate, milkfat, whey protein concentrate, sodium phosphate, and 2% or less of salt, calcium phosphate, lactic acid, sorbic acid, sodium citrate, sodium alginate, enzymes, apocarotenal, annatto, and cheese culture.

== Classification as a pasteurized prepared cheese product ==
In 2002, the FDA issued a warning letter to Kraft that Velveeta was being sold with packaging that falsely described it as a "pasteurized process cheese spread", The product listed milk protein concentrate (MPC) in its ingredients, which meant it no longer fit any of the FDA's cheese-related definitions. Velveeta is now sold in the US as a "pasteurized prepared cheese product", a term not defined by the FDA.

== Marketing and advertising ==
Kraft Foods has marketed Velveeta as an ingredient for chile con queso and grilled cheese sandwiches. It is sold in the United States, Canada, Panama, Hong Kong, the Philippines, and South Korea. In the 1930s and 1940s, it was sold in the United Kingdom and Germany as "Velveta".

In the 1980s, Velveeta used the advertising jingle, "Colby, Swiss and Cheddar, blended all together" in its US television commercials to explain its taste and texture because real cheese was used in the product at that time.

== See also ==
- Velveeta Shells & Cheese
- Convenience food
