= It's the Same Old Song =

1965 single by the Four Tops

Single by Four Tops

from the album Four Tops' Second Album
- B-side: "Your Love Is Amazing"
- Released: July 9, 1965
- Studio: Hitsville U.S.A., Detroit
- Genre: Soul, pop
- Length: 2:46
- Label: Motown
- Songwriter: Holland–Dozier–Holland
- Producers: Brian Holland; Lamont Dozier

Four Tops singles chronology
"I Can't Help Myself (Sugar Pie Honey Bunch)" (1965)	"It's the Same Old Song" (1965)	"Something About You" (1965)

"It's the Same Old Song" was recorded by the Four Tops for the Motown label. It was released in 1965 as the second single from their second album. Written and produced by Motown's main production team Holland–Dozier–Holland, the song is today one of The Tops' signatures, and was reportedly created—from initial concept to commercial release—in 24 hours. It reached #5 on the Billboard Hot 100 and #2 on the Billboard R&B chart. It also reached #34 in the UK.

== Writing and recording ==
Holland-Dozier-Holland originally wrote and cut a track of "It's the Same Old Song" for the Supremes in May 1965 before the Four Tops' version in July of that year. This first rendition would remain unreleased until 2017. A second version was cut in a very similar style to the Four Tops' styling and would be released in 1967 on The Supremes Sing Holland-Dozier-Holland.

After "I Can't Help Myself (Sugar Pie, Honey Bunch)" hit #1 in June 1965, the Four Tops' former label, Columbia Records, wanting to cash in on the group's success, re-released the Tops' 1960 Columbia single "Ain't That Love". Berry Gordy ordered that a new Four Tops single had to be released within a day's time.

At 3:00 PM that afternoon, the Holland brothers and Lamont Dozier wrote "It's the Same Old Song." Four Tops tenor Abdul "Duke" Fakir recalled:

(Songwriter), Lamont Dozier and I were both a little tipsy and he was changing the channels on the radio. He said, 'It sounds like the same old song.' And then he said, "Wait a minute." So he took "I Can't Help Myself (Sugar Pie Honey Bunch)" and reversed it using the same chord changes. The next day, we went to the studio and recorded it, and then they put it on acetate, shipped it out to disc jockeys across the country."

The engineering team worked around the clock perfecting the single's mix and making hand-cut vinyl records so that Berry Gordy's sister Esther in the Artist Development department could critique them and select the best ones for single release. By 3 P.M. the next day, 1500 copies of "It's the Same Old Song" had been delivered to radio DJs across the country, and the song eventually made it to number five on the Billboard Hot 100 chart and number two on the R&B chart.

"It's the Same Old Song" is very similar in melody and chord progressions to "I Can't Help Myself,” which in turn is even more similar in melody and chord progressions to "Where Did Our Love Go" by the Supremes, who covered "It's the Same Old Song," in 1967. Critic Maury Dean disputes that there is much in common with "I Can't Help Myself," saying that it is "a dynamic NEW treatment, with just a hint of Benny Benjamin's thundering drums echoing" "I Can't Help Myself.”

Allmusic critic Ron Wynn calls "It's the Same Old Song" "a tidy little number" with "one of the greatest lyrical hooks -- and titles -- ever." Fellow critic Steve Leggett calls it "wise beyond its era." Billboard claimed that the "pulsating Detroit sound proves a winner once again in this swinger." Cash Box described it as a "potent pop-blueser with a rhythmic fruggin’ beat" that was an "excellent follow-up" to "I Can't Help Myself." Record World called it a "sure-to-be-a-smash followup to their recent charttopper."

Pop music writers and bloggers have noted the similarity of the song's main instrumental riff with the marimba riff in the Rolling Stones song "Under My Thumb" which was first released almost a year later, on April 15, 1966, as part of their album Aftermath.

== Personnel ==
- Lead vocals by Levi Stubbs
- Background vocals by Abdul "Duke" Fakir, Renaldo "Obie" Benson, Lawrence Payton, and The Andantes: Jackie Hicks, Marlene Barrow, and Louvain Demps
- Instrumentation by The Funk Brothers and the Detroit Symphony Orchestra (strings)
  - Baritone saxophone by Mike Terry
- Written by Brian Holland, Lamont Dozier, and Edward Holland, Jr.
- Produced by Brian Holland and Lamont Dozier

== Charts ==
=== Weekly charts ===
Chart (1965)	Peak position
UK (Official Charts Company)	34
US Billboard Hot 100	5
US Billboard R&B	2
US Cash Box Top 100	6

=== Year-end charts ===
Chart (1965)	Rank
US Billboard Hot 100	83
US Cash Box Top 100	61

== Certifications ==
Region	Certification	Certified units/sales
United Kingdom (BPI)	Silver	200,000^{‡}
^{‡} Sales+streaming figures based on certification alone.

== Cover versions ==
- Dutch band the Motions had a Dutch top 10 hit with a slightly different arrangement, in 1966.
- In 1967, Australian singer Ray Brown (following his split with the Whispers), took his recording into the Australian top 10.
- In 1967 Siw Malmkvist recorded it in Swedish, "Samma gamla sång".
- In 1971, Claude François covered it in French, "C'est la meme chanson".
- In 1971, Jonathan King engaged a completely different arrangement under the name The Weathermen and this version reached the UK top 20 selling over 250,000 copies.
- In 1975, the Armada Orchestra included an instrumental version on their debut self-titled LP.
- Lamont Dozier, who co-wrote the song, recorded it himself for his 1976 album Right There.
- Dutch band Pussycat's cover (with the song title shortened to "Same old song") was a Dutch top 10 hit in 1978.
- In 1978, KC and the Sunshine Band did a disco-based cover. Anticipated to be a big hit as the lead off single from the band's Who Do Ya Love album, and on the heels of a succession of hits by the band, the record was a relative flop. It peaked at #35 on Billboard's Hot 100 chart, and at #41 on both Record World's and Cashbox's top singles charts. Bandleader Harry Wayne "KC" Casey cited lack of airplay, especially from R&B outlets, as the source of the record's chart failure. He stated, "[T]he record never got played and… our records go R&B first and then crossover to pop. But this one didn't get the R&B support; it didn't get the airplay.” On May 29, 1978, KC and the Sunshine Band performed this song on the TV special Happy Birthday, Bob, celebrating the 75th birthday of comedian Bob Hope; it was broadcast from the Kennedy Center in Washington, D.C.
- In 1995, the Pietasters included it on their second album, Oolooloo.
- In 2016, CID & Kaskade released their single "Sweet Memories", which features a repeated vocal sample from "It's the Same Old Song".

== Uses ==
- The group appeared in a Velveeta Shells & Cheese commercial, where they spoofed "It's the Same Old Song", with something called "It's Not the Same Old Side". This commercial features the group performing in outfits of blue and yellow, to match the colors of the Velveeta Shells & Cheese box.
- The group also appeared in a promo for The Rosie O'Donnell Show, where they also spoofed "It's the Same Old Song", with a song called "It's Not the Same Old Show".
- It appears in The Coen Brothers' 1984 film Blood Simple, in both the 99-minute theatrical release and the 96-minute 2001 and 2008 DVD releases. The song is not featured on the official soundtrack for the film, and is not on the 1995 99-minute VHS release.
- Although the song does not appear in the 1983 film The Big Chill it is included on both the Original Motion Picture Soundtrack and More Songs from the Big Chill albums.

== Notes ==
=== References ===
- Dennis, Robert (1998). Our Motown Recording Heritage, Part 3: Emergency Release. Recordingeq.com.
