= Kraft Foods Inc. =

Defunct American food and beverage company

- Final logo, used from 2009 to 2012

- Kraft headquarters in Northfield, IL, as seen in 2012
- Type: Public
- Traded as: CSE: KCC (1924-1926); NYSE: KFT (1926-2012); Nasdaq: KFT (2012)
- Industry: Food
- Predecessors: National Dairy; General Foods; Altria; Jacobs Suchard; Nabisco; Groupe Danone (Biscuit Division); Cadbury Schweppes; Warner Lambert (American Chicle Company)
- Founded: December 10, 1923; 102 years ago
- Founder: James L. Kraft
- Defunct: October 1, 2012; 14 years ago
- Fate: Renamed to Mondelez International, some assets were spun-off to create Kraft Foods
- Successor: Mondelez International (2012–pres.); Kraft Foods Group (2012–15)
- Headquarters: Northfield, Illinois, U.S.
- Area served: Worldwide
- Key people: Irene Rosenfeld (chairman & CEO)
- Products: Ultra-processed food
- Parent: Philip Morris Companies Inc. (1988–2007)

Kraft Foods Inc. (/ˈkræft/) was a multinational confectionery, food and beverage conglomerate. It marketed many brands in more than 170 countries. Twelve of its brands annually earned more than $1 billion worldwide: Cadbury, Jacobs, Kraft, LU, Maxwell House, Milka, Nabisco, Oreo, Oscar Mayer, Philadelphia, Trident, and Tang. Forty of its brands were at least a century old.

The company was headquartered in Northfield, Illinois, near Chicago.

Kraft was listed on the New York Stock Exchange and became a component of the Dow Jones Industrial Average on September 22, 2008, replacing the American International Group. In August 2011, the company announced plans to split into a North American grocery products business and a faster-growing global snacks company. The snacks company, Mondelez International Inc., is recognized as the legal successor to the old Kraft Foods Inc., while the grocery company took over the Kraft Foods name, and is now a part of Kraft Heinz.

== History ==
=== Precursor ===
Kraft Foods traced its roots to the National Dairy Products Corporation, formed on December 10, 1923, by Edward E. Rieck and Thomas H. McInerney. The firm was initially set up to execute on a rollup strategy in the fragmented United States ice cream industry. Through acquisitions it expanded into a full range of dairy products. By 1930 it was the largest dairy company in the United States and the world, exceeding Borden.

McInnerney operated the Hydrox Corporation, an ice cream company located in Chicago, Illinois. In 1923 he went to Wall Street to convince investment bankers there to finance his scheme for consolidating the United States ice cream industry. He initially found "hard sledding" with one banker saying the dairy industry "lacked dignity". He persevered and convinced a consortium including Goldman Sachs and Lehman Brothers to finance a roll-up strategy.

As a result of his efforts, National Dairy Products Corporation was formed in 1923 in a merger of McInnerney's Hydrox with Rieck McJunkin Dairy Co of Pittsburgh, Pennsylvania. The resulting firm was then listed on the New York Stock Exchange with the offer of 125,000 shares having been oversubscribed.

The firm grew quickly through a large number of acquisitions. As is typical in a roll-up strategy, acquisitions were primarily for stock in National rather than cash. National Dairy Products Corporation acquired more than 55 firms between 1923 and 1931, with a few notable entities among those being:

Year	Firm	Sector	Location
1924	W.E. Hoffman	Ice cream	Pennsylvania
1925	Dunkin Ice Cream	Ice cream	Illinois
1925	Sheffield Farms	Fluid milk, ice cream, other	New York
1926	Breyer's Ice Cream (dessert products currently owned by Unilever)	Ice cream	Pennsylvania
1928	Breakstone Brothers	Fluid milk, cheese	New York
1928	General Ice Cream	Ice cream	New York, East Coast
1929	Hiland Dairy	Fluid milk, other	Kentucky
1930	Kraft-Phenix	Cheese, other	US, international
1931	Consolidated Dairy Products	Ice cream, other dairy	New York, New Jersey

=== Beginning ===
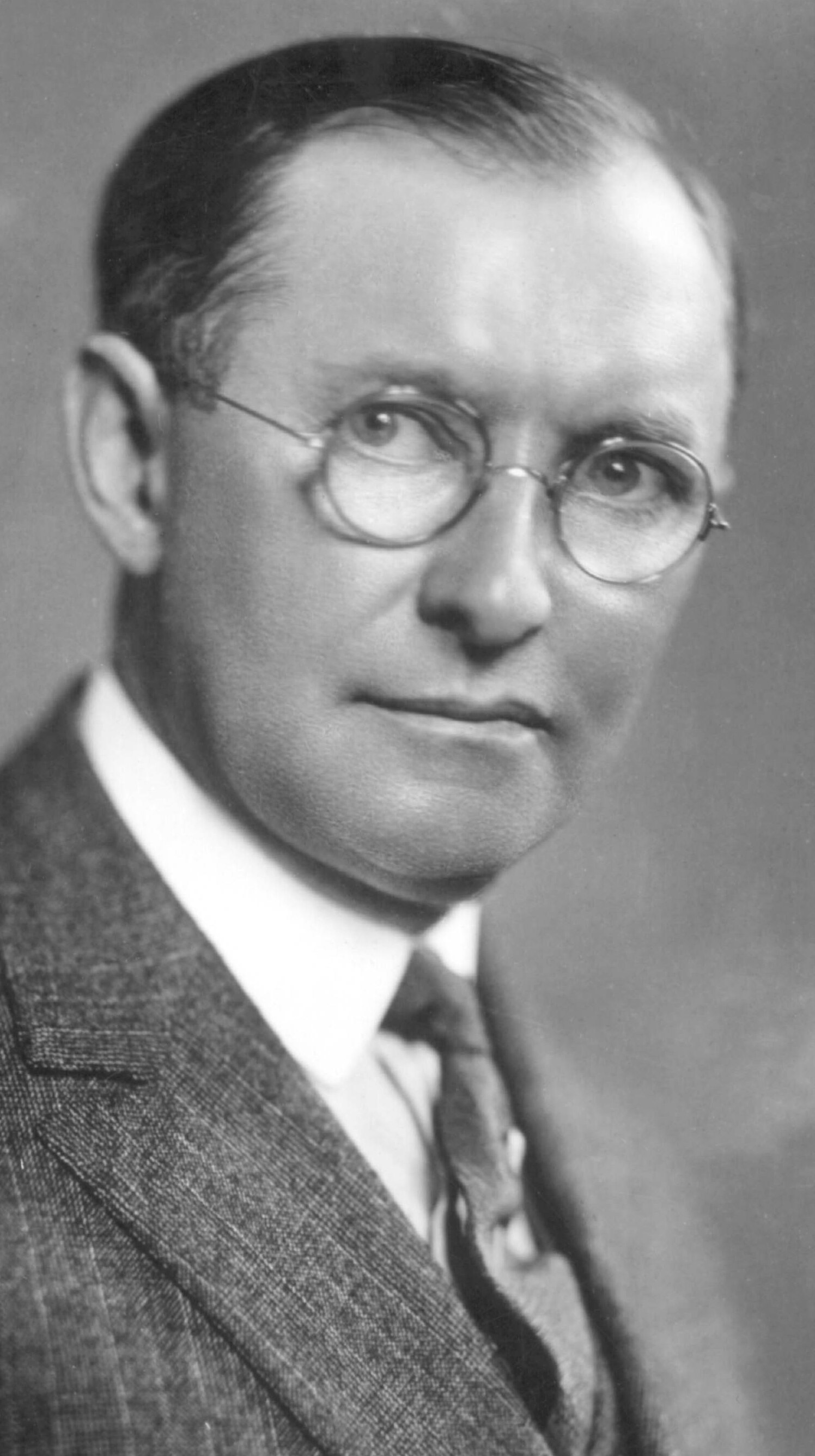
James Lewis Kraft, founder

Born in Stevensville, Ontario, Canada, in 1874, James L. Kraft immigrated to the United States in 1903 and started a wholesale door-to-door cheese business in Chicago; its first year of operations was "dismal", losing US$3,000 and a horse. It then took hold and Kraft was joined by his four brothers to form J.L. Kraft and Bros. Company in 1909. As early as 1911, circulars and advertisements were in use by the company.

In 1912, the company established its New York City headquarters to prepare for its international expansion. By 1914, 31 varieties of cheese were sold around the U.S. because of heavy product development, expansion by marketing, and opening a wholly owned cheese factory in Stockton, Illinois.

In 1915, the company invented pasteurized processed cheese that did not need refrigeration, thus giving a longer shelf life than conventional cheese. The process was patented in 1916 and about six million pounds of the product were sold to the U.S. Army for military rations during World War I.

In 1916, the company began national advertising and had made its first acquisition—a Canadian cheese company.

In 1924, the company changed its name to Kraft Cheese Company and listed on the Chicago Stock Exchange. In 1925, Marye Dahnke began her career at Kraft as the company home economist, the first woman for that sector of the food industry.

In 1926, Kraft was listed on the New York Stock Exchange. The listing strengthened the company’s national profile and provided additional capital for expanding its manufacturing and distribution network.

From the mid‑1920s through 1930, Kraft acquired a number of regional dairy and cheese firms as it expanded its national production network. The table below summarizes the acquisitions documented in a judicial document, official corporate announcements, and newspaper coverage.

Year (Note: Except of annotated cases, all years are taken from the judicial document.)	Firm	Sector	Location
1924	P. E. Sharpless Co.	Cream cheese, other dairy products	Pennsylvania: Concordville, Philadelphia, Toughkenamon; Delaware: Wilmington; New York: New York City
1925	Kraft-MacLaren Cheese Co., Ltd.	Cheese, other dairy products	Canada: Montreal
1925	C. D. Reynolds Co.	Cold storage	New York: Alfred
1925	Burton Creamery Co.	Butter, Cheese, other dairy products	Wisconsin: Afton; Utah: Ogden
1926	Dairystate Cold Storage	Cold storage	Wisconsin: Wisconsin Rapids, Plymouth
1926	Bitter Root Valley Cheese Co.	Cheese, other dairy products	Montana: Bitter Root Valley (Note: According to the articles in the Daily Missoulian and the Flathead Courier, the Bitter Root Valley Cheese Company was formed in 1925 through the merger of the Corvallis and Victor cheese factories. In 1925, the company was co‑owned by Kraft and was producing Kraft’s “Elkhorn” brand cheese.)
1926	Plymouth Refrigerating Co.	Cold storage	Wisconsin: Plymouth
1926	C. A. Straubel Co.	Cheese wholesales	Wisconsin: Green Bay
1927	Laabs Cheese Co. (Note: In a financial report by Kraft, two similar companies were mentioned as differently acquired; "H. F. Laab Cheese Co (Idaho)" as a subsidiary company, and "Laabs Cheese Co. (Wis.)" as a controlled company. But, other external reports dealt "H. F. Laab Cheese Co" as a company from Wisconsin. This entry deals both. The only entity for which a corporate registration can be confirmed in OpenCorporates is "H. F. Laabs Cheese Company" in Idaho.)	Cheese, other dairy products	Wisconsin: Dorchestor, Curtiss; Idaho: Burley, Rupert, Paul, Delco, Grace.
1927	Velveeta Cheese Co.	Cheese, other dairy products	New York: Monroe
1928	Milani Co.	Salad dressings	Illinois: Chicago
1928	A. E. Wright	Salad dressings, mayonnaise	Illinois: Chicago
1928	Phenix Cheese	Cheese, other dairy products	National
1928	Brodhead Cheese & Cold Storage Co.	Cheese, other dairy products	Wisconsin: Brodhead; New York
1928	Southern Dairies	Fluid milk, ice cream, cream, buttermilk, butter	D.C., Maryland, Pennsylvania, Virginia, North Carolina, Georgia, Florida, Kentucky, Tennessee, Alabama
1928	Karlen-Bickelhaupt & Co. (Note: According to the judicial document, Karlen-Bickelhaupt is a combination of Adam Bickelhaupt and J. Karlen Cheese Co., Inc.)	Cheese, other dairy products	New York: Rome, Redmond
1928	Miller-Richardson & Co. (Note: According to the judicial document, Miller-Richardson & Co. was a combination of B. B. Miller & Son, Richardson & Co, T. W. McGrath & Son, Lowville Cheese Co, John S. Martin & Co, W. J. Peach & Son, Jacob Vogt, R. J. Chandler, W. J. Benjamin & Son, W. H. McCadam & Son.)	Cheese, other dairy products	New York
1928	E. W. Coon	Cheese, other dairy products	Wisconsin: Wisconsin Rapids, Plymouth
1928	Badger Cheese Co.	Cheese, other dairy products	Wisconsin: Monroe
1928	Birnamwood Wittenberg Milk Co. (Note: An article in Food Industries calls it as "Wittenberg and Birnamwood Creamery Companies")	Dairy products	Wisconsin: Birnamwood, Wittenberg, Wausau, Antigo
1928	R. M. Mills (Note: A financial report by Kraft wrote its name as F. N. Mills.)	Cheese, other dairy products	New York: Watertown
1928	Lexington Purity Creamery	Cream, cheese, other dairy products	New York: Manhattan (Note: In later, Kraft consolidated the South Cuba Creamery with the Purity Creamery, then consolidated Sheffield dairy plants to the Purity Creamery.)
1928	Potsdam Creamery Co. (Note: According to the NYSE Listing Statement A8264 Exhibit D, the official name of this company would be the "Potsdam Milk Products Co." It was organized on 1909 as the successor of the "Hewittville Creamery." It should be distinguished from the unrelated "Potsdam Creamery, Inc." on Depot Street, which was a later enterprise established around 1940. That firm operated independently until 1962, and its building was cleared in 1963 during the major reconstruction project for Montgomery Ward. Despite the similar name, the two firms were unrelated and operated in different periods.)	Butter, other dairy products	New York: Potsdam
1928	Peacock Cheese Co.	Cheese, other dairy products	Wisconsin: Sheboygan, Platteville, Madison, Cobb
1928	S. J. Stevens Co.	Cheese, butter, other dairy products	Ohio: Cincinnati (Note: According to the obituary of S. J. Stevens, when Kraft acquired S. J. Stevens Co., their business in Cincinnati was already sold to J. C. Mulvihill & Co..); Wisconsin: Green Bay, Random Lake, Campbellsport
1928	Sheboygan Cheese Co. (Note: The Sheboygan Cheese Co. was originally established by P. H. Peacock of Sheboygan and A. H. Barber of Chicago. Their names appear as exhibitors at the American Dairy Show in Chicago in 1891, and the company is listed as a cheese dealer in Wright’s City Directory of 1893. Later, while Peacock focused on operating the Sheboygan Cold Storage Co., the Sheboygan Dairy Products Co., and the Peacock Cheese Co., several newspapers misleadingly used the name "Sheboygan Cheese Co." as an abbreviation for a different firm, the Sheboygan County Cheese Co.—a company established by William Wedegartner, first appearing in city directories in 1909, whose wholesale business was sold to A. D. DeLand Co. in 1918. For example, headlines such as "Sheboygan Cheese Co. is sold" actually referred to the Wedegartner company. After Peacock disposed of his dairy interests, F. J. Rohde continued the Sheboygan Cheese business and later sold it to Kraft. The company survived until its merger with the H. G. Davis Cheese Co.)	Cheese distribution	Wisconsin: Sheboygan
1928	St. Lawrence County Dairies, Inc.	Fluid milk, other dairy products	New York: Massena
1928	National Cheese Co. (partial business) (Note: A financial report by Kraft wrote their name as "Chicago National Cheese Company." There is a possibility that original company name before their acquisition was "Chicago Cheese and Farms Products Co.")	Cheese, other dairy products	Illinois: Chicago
1928	Maltoat Products Co. (Note: The spelling "Maltoa Product Co." appears to be an OCR-induced error in the web site, and it has been circulated online, although it does not appear in printed sources.)	Malted milk, malted milk products	Wisconsin: Milwaukee
1928	Food Specialties Distributing Co.	Mayonnaise, cheese, grocery wholesaling	Ohio: Dayton; Illinois: Chicago
1928	Grover-Ansted Cheese Co.	Cheese, other dairy products	Ohio: Toledo
1928	North America Cold Storage Co.	Cold storage	Illinois: Chicago
1928	Kentucky Cheese Co.	Cheese and grocery retailing	Kentucky: Louisville, Lexington
1928	Bradley Cheese Co.	Cheese distribution	Pennsylvania: Pittsburgh
1928	Davison Cheese Co.	Cheese and grocery wholesaling	New Jersey: Jersey City
1928	Downey Cheese Co. (Note: According to the obituary of John C. Thompson, the Downey Cheese Co. was closed on 1941.)	Cheese wholesaling	Oregon: Portland
1928	Maher Cheese	Cheese and grocery distribution	California: San Francisco
1928	Porter Cheese Co.	Cheese and grocery wholesaling	Massachusetts: Somerville
1928	Sanchez Cheese Co.	Cheese and grocery wholesaling	Illinois: Chicago
1928	C. A. Wheeler Co.	Cheese and grocery wholesaling (Note: According to the court report published in The United States Daily, C. A. Wheeler was not a cheese manufacturer but a wholesale company.)	New York: Manhattan, Brooklyn
1928	A. B. Winkley Cheese Co.	Cheese, butter, other dairy products	Washington: Seattle
1929	Ward Dry Milk Co.	Dried buttermilk	Minnesota: St. Paul
1929	Atlas Dry Milk Co.	Dry milk	California: Chico
1929	Buflolac Corp. (Note: The company's name appears with variant spellings, including "Buflolac" and "Buffolac.")	Buttermilk (Note: According to the report, they sold the dried buttermilk under the name "Buflo-Lac-Genuine Dried Buttermilk.")	Minneapolis: Minnesota
1929	Henard Mayonnaise Co.	Mayonnaise, salad dressing, Thousand Island dressing	Tennessee: Nashville; Georgia: Atlanta; Texas: Dallas
1929	Gilbert J. Easton (Note: Several newspapers, apparently following to an Associated Press dispatch, misreported the name of acquired company as "D. J. Easton," like Chicago Daily Tribune.)	Mayonnaise	New Jersey: Newark
1929	John E. Cain (cheese business) (Note: Kraft acquired only the Cheese-related business from John E. Cain's company. His company was changing their focus to mayonnaise which Kraft did not acquired. It was sold to TreeHouse Foods on 2013.)	Cheese	Massachusetts: Cambridge
1929	Crawford Farms, Inc.	Cheese, other dairy products	New York: Millbrook
1929	Missoula Creamery, Inc.	Butter, ice cream, other products	Montana: Missoula
1929	Red Rock Dairy (Note: According to the historical account presented in their 1924 advertisement, the original company operated under the name "Red Rock Dairy," while later branches adopted the title "Red Rock Creamery." The TNEC report lists two separate acquisitions —"Red Rock Dairy" in Portland and "Red Rock Creamery" in Kent, However, the judicial documents, press releases, and newspaper reports from October 1929 refer only to a single acquisition of Red Rock Dairy.)	Cheese, butter, other product	Oregon: Portland; Washington: Kent; California: Petaluma
1929	Sauquoit Valley Dairy Co., Inc.	Butter, other dairy products	New York: Utica
1929	Sentinel Creamery, Inc.	Butter, ice cream, other dairy products	Montana: Missoula
1929	Gelfand Manufacturing	Mayonnaise	Maryland: Baltimore
1929 (Note: The document wrote that Kraft purchased the stocks of International Wood Products twice, the first was on 1925-04-21, the second was on 1929-11-30. However, the report by Kraft on 1928, IWP was noted as a subsidiary company (Kraft owned 100% stock).)	International Wood Products	Cheese boxes	California: Niles
1930	Tuttle Cheese Co.	Cheese, other dairy products	California: Oakland

In May 1926 the Kraft Walker Cheese Co. was registered in Australia. It was a separate company from Fred Walker & Co. but managed by the same staff. Fred Walker was chairman by 1930, and after his death in July 1935, Kraft acquired the company.

Later, in 1927, it established its London, United Kingdom, and Hamburg, Germany, sales offices—its first forays outside North America. Sales for 1927 were $60.4m.

In 1928, it acquired Phenix Cheese Company, the maker of a cream cheese branded as Philadelphia cream cheese, founded by Jason F. Whitney, Sr., and the company changed its name to Kraft-Phenix Cheese Company.

In 1929, The New York Times reported that Kraft Phenix, The Hershey Company and Colgate were looking at merging. In the same year, it was reported that National, Borden and Standard Brands (now part of Kraft Foods) were all looking at acquiring the firm.

By 1930, it had captured forty percent of the cheese market in the U.S. and was the third largest dairy company in the United States after National Dairy and Borden.

=== Post-National Dairy acquisition of Kraft-Phenix ===
At the time of the acquisition in 1930, National Dairy had sales of $315m compared with $85m for Kraft Phenix. National Dairy management ran the combined business. Following the Kraft-Phenix acquisition, the firm continued to be called National Dairy until 1969, when it changed its name to Kraftco.

Historically, all of the firm's sales came from dairy products. Its product lines began to diversify away from dairy products to caramel candies, macaroni and cheese dinners and margarines. From the 1950s onward, the firm began to move away from low value added commodity dairy products, such as fluid milk. This trend would continue for the firm, through neglect and divestiture, until the primary remaining dairy product produced by the firm would be cheese. As a result, the modern history of the firm emphasizes the cheese history.

In 1933, the company began marketing by radio sponsorship. In 1935, the Sealtest brand of ice cream was launched as a unified national brand to replace the firm's numerous regional brands.

During World War II, the company sent four million pounds of cheese to Britain weekly.

Product development and advertising helped the company to grow during the postwar years, launching sliced processed cheese and Cheez Whiz, a brand of process cheese sauce, in the 1950s.

During these years, Thomas McInnerney, National Dairy's founder, and James L. Kraft, Kraft's founder, died, and at the end of the decade, the divisions became less autonomous and even diversified to the glass-packaging business with the acquisition of Metro Glass in 1956.

In 1947, the company tested the marketing power of the emerging medium of television by producing an hour-long drama/anthology series, Kraft Television Theatre. The product advertised on the program, MacLaren's Imperial Cheese, was selected because "... [it had] not only had no advertising appropriation whatsoever, but had not even been distributed for several years." As described by internal documents of J. Walter Thompson—the advertising firm which conceived of the marketing test—the result was "although there was no other advertising support for it whatsoever, still grocery stores could not keep up with the demand."

In the 1960s, product development became intense, launching fruit jellies, fruit preserves, marshmallows, barbecue sauces and Kraft Singles, a brand of individually-wrapped cheese slices. During this decade, the company also expanded in many markets worldwide.

In 1961, the firm acquired Dominion Dairies of Canada, marking the first effort by the firm to expand into fluid milk and ice cream outside the United States. In the same year it also acquired The Southern Oil Company in Manchester, England.

=== National Dairy becomes Kraft ===
In 1969, the firm changed its name from National Dairy to Kraftco Corporation. The reason for the name change was given at the time: "Expansion and innovation have taken us far afield from the regional milk and ice cream business we started with in 1923. Dollar sales of these original products have remained relatively static over the past ten years and, in 1969 accounted for approximately 25% of our sales." At the same time, the firm transferred to Glenview, Illinois, in 1972. In 1976, its name changed to Kraft, Inc. to emphasize the trademark the company had been known for and as a result of the fact that dairy, other than cheese, was now only a minor part of the company's sales. Reorganization also occurred after the name change.

=== Dart merger ===
Logo used on Kraft branded products from 1988, formerly used as a corporate logo from 1995 to 2009

In 1980, Kraft merged with Dart Industries—makers of the Duracell brand of batteries, Tupperware brand of plastic containers, West Bend brand of home appliances, Wilsonart brand of plastics and Thatcher glass—to form Dart & Kraft.

During the 1980s, Dart & Kraft offered mixed results to its shareholders, as new acquisitions in the food business—such as Churny premium cheeses, Tombstone Pizza, Lender's Bagels, Frusen Gladje ice cream and Celestial Seasonings tea—slightly offset the lagging nonfood business, due to Tupperware's decrease in sales and KitchenAid's (acquired soon after the merger) slide in market share, leading Dart & Kraft to spin off its nonfood business (except Duracell batteries) into a new entity (Premark International, Inc.) while changing its name back to Kraft, Inc. Premark was bought by Illinois Tool Works in 1999. Kraft then acquired General Host's All American Gourmet Co. unit in 1987. In 1988, Kraft sold Duracell to private equity firm Kohlberg Kravis Roberts, who then put it into an initial public offering in 1989. Gillette bought Duracell in 1996, and itself was acquired by Procter and Gamble in 2005. Kraft sold the Celestial Seasonings tea to Vestar Capital Partners in 1988.

=== Philip Morris acquisition and merger with General Foods ===
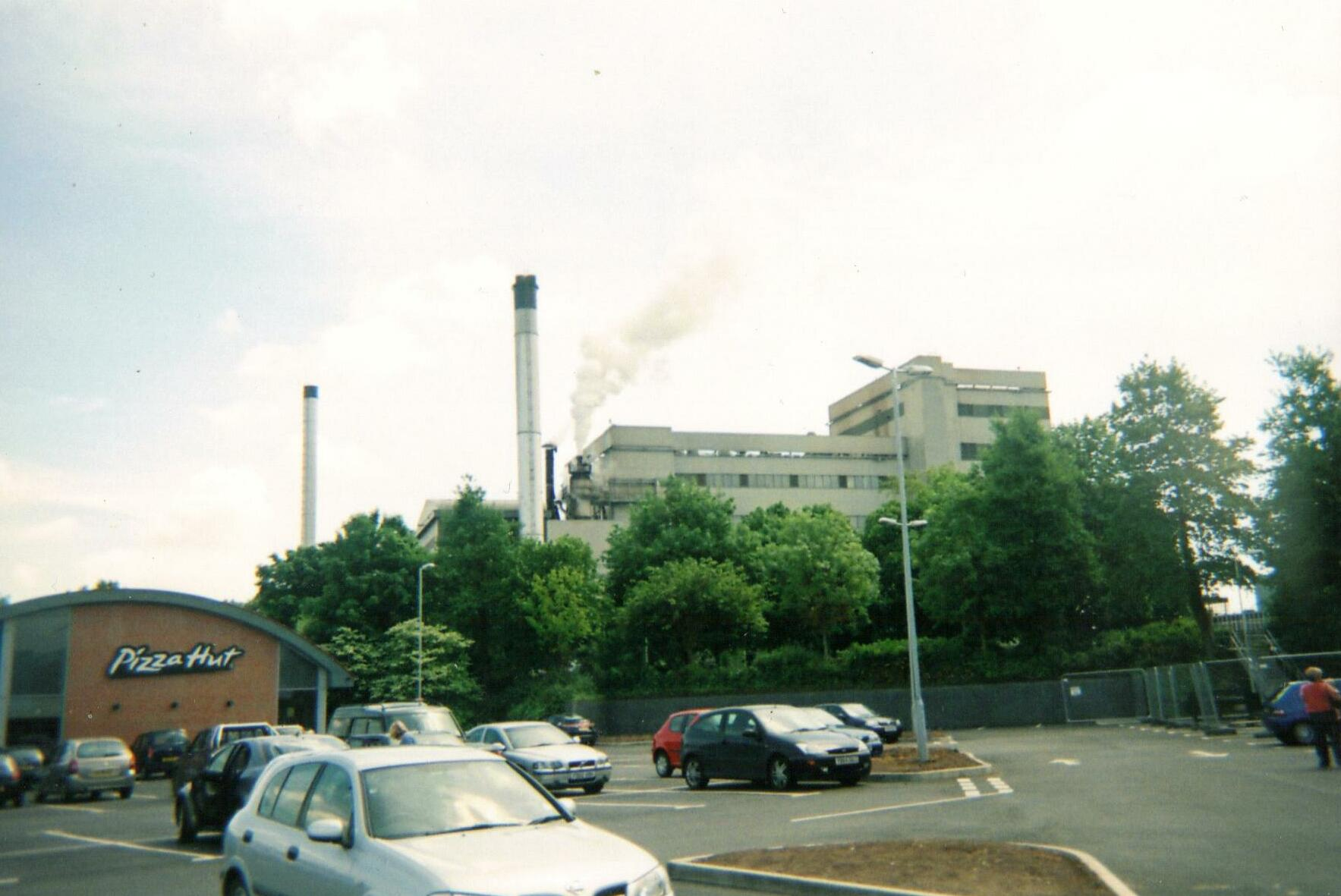
The Kraft Foods factory in Banbury's Ruscote estate. It has been a major employer in the town since 1965.

At the end of 1988, Philip Morris Companies purchased Kraft for $12.9 billion. In 1989, Kraft merged with Philip Morris's General Foods unit—makers of Oscar Mayer meats, Maxwell House coffee, Jell-O gelatin, Budget Gourmet frozen dinners, Entenmann's baked goods, Kool-Aid, Crystal Light and Tang powdered beverage mixes, Post Cereals, Shake 'n Bake flavored coatings and numerous other packaged foods—as Kraft General Foods. Its aggressive product development was reversed after the merger, as it became slow in addressing issues on its product lines due to its size, and also company politics.

In 1990, the company acquired Jacobs Suchard (a European coffee and confectionery giant that owns Jacobs, Suchard, Sugus, Milka, Toblerone, Cote d'Or, Nabob, and other confectionary and coffee brands) and Freia Marabou (a Scandinavian confectionery maker that owns Freia, Daim bar, Marabou, Twist, and other confectionary brands) to expand overseas as its business was heavily dependent on the U.S. In 1993, it acquired RJR Nabisco's cold cereal business (mainly Shredded Wheat and Shreddies cereals), Terry's of York and Callard & Bowser and Altoids from United Biscuits, while selling its Breyers ice-cream division to Unilever and its Birds Eye unit to Dean Foods. In 1994, it sold its frozen dinners unit to H.J. Heinz and in 1995, it sold its foodservice unit. Also in 1994, it acquired an 82% stake in Romanian confectionary company Poiana-Produse Zaharoase SA.

In 1995, it changed its name to the present name, Kraft Foods. The same year, it sold its bakery division (except Lender's Bagels, which was sold in 1996 to Kellogg Company), its caramel & marshmallow divisions and its tablespreads division. Log Cabin syrup was sold in 1997.

On August 2, 1996, Kraft announced a deal with PepsiCo to market the Taco Bell brand of grocery products.

In 1998, Kraft announced a partnership with Starbucks to market and distribute the Starbucks brand of coffee beans in grocery stores.

By 2007, Philip Morris (now Altria Inc.) sold its stake in Kraft Foods and the companies separated.

=== Financial expansion ===
In 2000, Philip Morris (renamed Altria in 2003) acquired Nabisco Holdings for $18.9 billion and merged the company with Kraft Foods the same year. Also in 2000, the company acquired Balance Bar. In 2001, Philip Morris sold 280 million Kraft shares via the third-largest IPO of all time, retaining an 88.1% stake in the company. Also in 2001, Kraft acquired the Bulgarian and Romanian coffee businesses, as well as the Moroccan coffee business. On January 4, 2002, Kraft acquired Stollwerck's Eastern European confectionery businesses. In March 2004, Kraft acquired juice maker Veryfine.

In 2004, it sold its sugar confectionery division to Wrigley, while doing minor divestitures—including its hot cereals division (Cream of Wheat) to B&G Foods in 2007, its fruit snacks division to Kellogg's in 2005, its pet snacks division (Milk-Bone) to Del Monte Foods in 2006, juice drinks and Fruit2o to Sunny Delight Beverages in 2007, its yogurt division to CoolBrands International, its British desserts business to Premier Foods and some grocery brands in 2006.

In 2006, the company bought the Southern European business of United Biscuits, acquiring several local brands such as Galletas Fontanenda.

Investor Nelson Peltz bought a three-percent stake at Kraft Foods and discussed revitalizing the business with executives, with options such as buying Wendy's fast-food chain or selling off Post cereals and Maxwell House coffee. On January 31, 2007, after months of speculation, the company announced that its 88.1% stake would be spun off to Altria shareholders at the end of March 2007, giving each approximately 0.7 shares of Kraft for each share of Altria they owned. Kraft became an independent publicly held company.

In July 2007, the company bought Groupe Danone's biscuit (cookie) and cereal division for $7.2 billion, including iconic French biscuit brand Lefèvre-Utile. While two years earlier fiery protests had arisen over plans for American PepsiCo's hostile takeover of the French company, Kraft's announcement was not met with the same protests, in part because Kraft agreed not to close French factories and keep the new merged divisions headquarters near Paris for at least three years.

In November 2007, Kraft agreed to sell its cereal unit to Ralcorp Holdings, a major private-label food maker, for $2.6 billion in a form of a spin-off merger. This would add 50% to Ralcorp's sales, to $3.3 billion, and will be used for Kraft's debt payment, which was at $13.4 billion, in danger of a downgrade by Standard and Poor's.

In February 2008, Berkshire Hathaway, run by billionaire investor Warren E. Buffett, announced that it had acquired an 8% stake in Kraft then worth over $4 billion. Buffett's business partner Charles Munger had also invested over $300 million in Kraft. Berkshire Hathaway owned 5.6% of the outstanding stock of Kraft Foods, as reported in the holding company's 2010 annual report.

On September 22, 2008, the company replaced the troubled insurance company American International Group in the Dow Jones Industrial Average.

On December 8, 2009, Kraft sold Balance Bar to Brynwood Partners.

==== Purchase of Cadbury ====
On September 7, 2009, Kraft made a £10.2 billion takeover offer for the long-established British confectionery group Cadbury, makers of Dairy Milk and Bournville chocolate. On November 9, 2009, Kraft's £9.8bn takeover bid was rejected by Cadbury. Cadbury stated that the takeover bid was a "derisory" offer. Kraft renewed the offer under the same terms on December 4, 2009. The offer generated significant political and public opposition in the United Kingdom and abroad, even leading to calls for the government to implement a policy of economic protectionism in cases of takeovers of large companies. On January 19, 2010, Cadbury finally approved a revised offer from Kraft, valuing the confectionery business at $19.5 billion (£11.5 billion). The funding for the takeover was partially provided by the Royal Bank of Scotland, the British part-state-owned bank.

The Cadbury purchase was part of the long-term strategy of Irene Rosenfeld, CEO and Kraft Chairman since March 2007, who developed a three-year turnaround plan designed to drive the profitable growth of Kraft Foods. Rosenfeld wanted to develop new markets and expand product range when she assumed the role of chairman. It was assumed that the purchase of Cadbury would help Kraft products develop in new markets such as Brazil and India because of Cadbury's current strong presence in those markets. India is one of its most resilient markets with sales growth of 20% and profits growing at 30% in a competitive market. Kraft believed the Cadbury purchase was also necessary because of the likelihood of Nestlé and Hershey joining together. Kraft also believed it could eke out savings of at least $675m annually by the end of the third year. Irene Rosenfeld saw the Kraft Cadbury merger as the "logical next step in our transformation toward a high-growth, higher-margin company". She also justified the merger as a necessary step in order to build a "global powerhouse in snacks, confectionery and quick meals".

Following the purchase of Cadbury, Kraft commanded 14.8% of the global candy and gum market. Kraft argued that it could take advantage of the Cadbury distribution in developing markets of India, Brazil and Mexico. As incomes rise in these developing nations, Kraft hopes that products such as Oreo will become impulse buys for children. Mars, Inc. is second in the confectionery market with 14.6% share, followed by Nestlé with 7.8%.

At the time of the purchase, the chocolate and sugar industry had been growing rapidly at 15% over the previous three years and was valued at $113 billion. The purchase of Cadbury was considered strange because they did not have a strong foothold on the confectionery market, but at the time Kraft noted their production of confectionery foods like Toblerone and candy foods like Oreo. Cadbury also owned popular gum brands such as Stride, Trident, Dentyne, and Chiclets. Roger Carr, chairman of Cadbury, discussed his approval of the takeover by Kraft by saying, "We believe the offer represents good value for Cadbury shareholders and are pleased with the commitment that Kraft Foods has made to our heritage, values and people throughout the world."

In July 2010, Kraft announced it was selling Cadbury's Romanian unit to Oryxa Capital as a condition for the European Commission's approval for the company's purchase of Cadbury.

==== Acquisition fallout ====
Cadbury sales were flat after Kraft's acquisition. Despite the Cadbury takeover helping boost sales by 30%, Kraft's net profit for the fourth quarter fell 24% to $540m due to costs associated with integrating the UK business after the acquisition. Kraft spent a one-time $1.3 billion in integration costs to achieve $675 million in recurring annual synergy savings by the end of 2012 (estimated).

Kraft was forced to increase prices to offset rising commodity costs in North America and Europe. Kraft has had to contend with the higher cost of ingredients such as corn, sugar and cocoa. Kraft chief executive Irene Rosenfeld said, "We expect it will remain weak for the foreseeable future." Taking into account integration costs, the acquisition knocked about 33% off Kraft's earnings per share immediately after the purchase of Cadbury. In March 2011, Kraft caused national outrage when they sold the site of a historic Cadbury factory it vowed not to close for £50 million after initially publicly promising the continuity of production within the UK in order to win over support for the deal from shareholders. Instead, production was immediately outsourced to Poland. The Somerdale Factory was closed just days after the takeover by Kraft Foods. Former Cadbury workers demanded an apology for the abrupt selling of the plant, but Kraft's CEO Irene Rosenfeld refused to explain her actions. Kraft continues to use Cadbury brands in emerging markets to expand all of its products. In April 2011, Kraft set to invest $150 million in South Africa's manufacturing plants over three years. President Sanjay Khosla said, "South Africa is a priority market for us, where we focus on power brands like Cadbury chocolate."

==== Sale of frozen pizza division to Nestlé ====
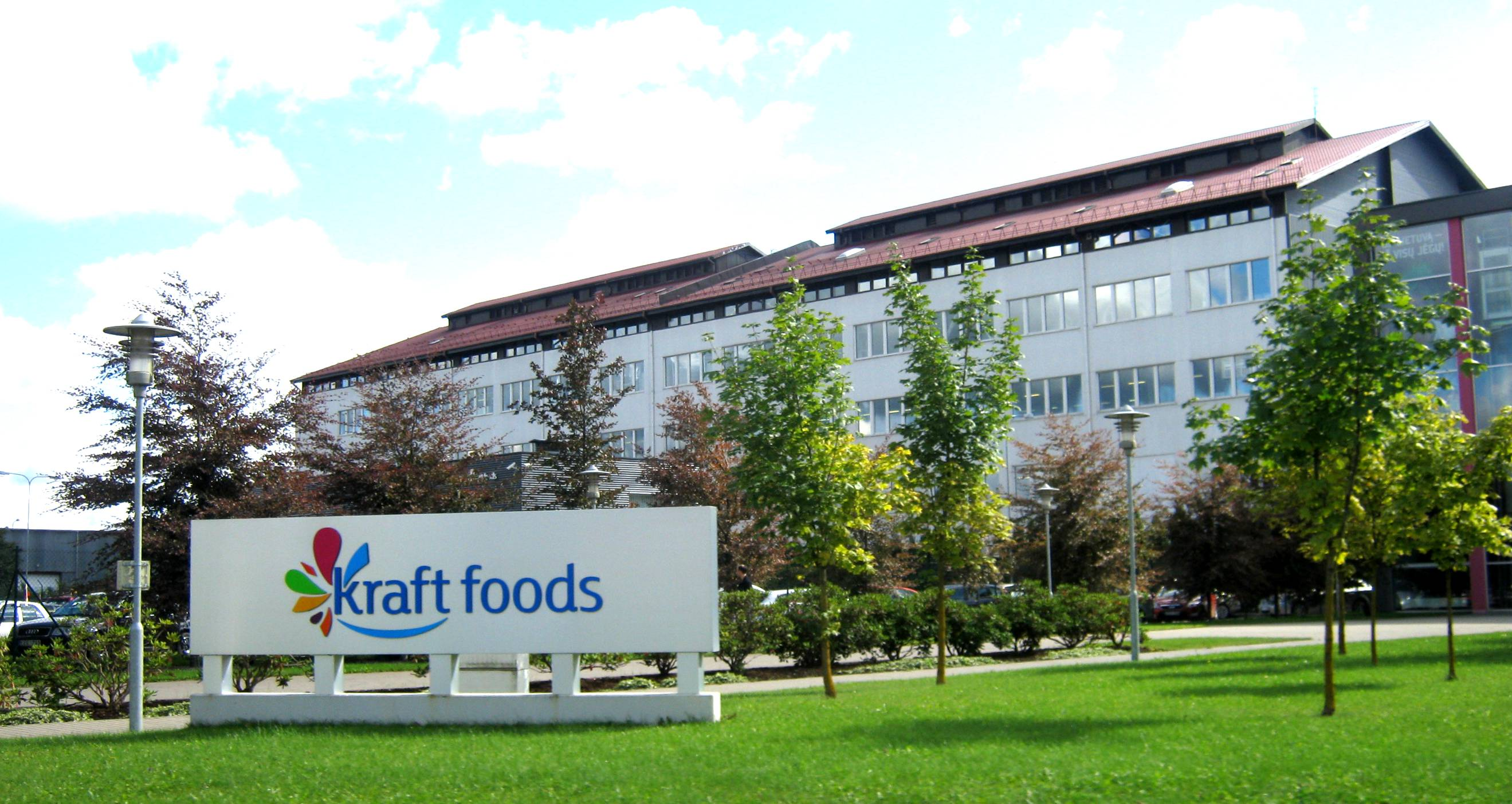
Kraft Foods offices in Lithuania, September 2011

On March 1, 2010, Nestlé concluded the purchase of Kraft's North American frozen pizza business for $3.7 billion. Kraft left the door open to repurchase with a buyback option not before one year and not after three years for the original sale price of $3.7 billion. Although not likely if Kraft were to want to repurchase they would have to come up with cash only and no stocks. The sale included DiGiorno, Tombstone and Jack's brands in the United States, the Delissio brand in Canada and the California Pizza Kitchen trademark license. It also includes two Wisconsin manufacturing facilities in Medford and Little Chute. The business generated 2009 net revenues of $1.6 billion, with 3,400 employees.

=== Proposed split ===
After a period of poor share performance and investor criticism, Rosenfeld was forced to announce in 2011 the proposed split of the company into two new entities. Both were to be listed on the New York Stock Exchange, but the company has recently decided to move to NASDAQ, and the split companies will also trade on NASDAQ. The first entity would retain the Kraft foods names and brands, and focus on the North American foods business. The second, later proposed to be named Mondelēz International, would focus on the global snacks business, and would include the former Cadbury businesses, plus global brands including Dairylea. On April 2, 2012, Kraft Foods Inc. announced that it had filed a Form 10 Registration Statement to the SEC to split the company into two companies to serve the "North American grocery business". The split was structured so that the old Kraft Foods changed its name to Mondelez International and spun off Kraft Foods Group as a new publicly traded company.

== Sponsorships and promotions ==
Kraft Foods Inc was an official partner and sponsor of Major League Soccer and sponsored the Kraft Nabisco Championship, one of the four "majors" on the LPGA tour. The company also sponsored the Kraft Fight Hunger Bowl, a post-season college football bowl game.

Kraft Hockeyville was a Canadian reality television series developed by CBC Sports in 2006 and sponsored by Kraft Foods, in which communities across Canada competed to demonstrate their commitment to the sport of ice hockey. The contest revolved around a central theme of community spirit in Canada. In 2007, the contest was relegated to a series of segments aired on Hockey Night in Canada.

Kraft released an iPad app called "Big Fork Little Fork" in 2011 which, in addition to games and other distractions, provided information regarding how to use Kraft foods in nutritious ways. The app cost $1.99; a version for home computers was also available on the iTunes app store.

== Brands ==
Before the company was split, its core businesses were in beverage, cheese, dairy foods, snack foods, confectionery, and convenience foods.

Kraft's major brands (those that generated revenues exceeding $1 billion) were:

- Cadbury
- Jacobs
- Kraft, including Kraft Dinner, Kraft Singles, Kraft Mayo
- LU
- Maxwell House
- Milka
- Nabisco
- Oreo
- Oscar Mayer
- Philadelphia
- Trident
- Tang

Seventy additional brands have revenues greater than $100 million. In total, 40 brands are at least 100 years old.

== Controversies ==
=== Trans-fat litigation ===
In 2003, a California lawyer made national headlines by suing Kraft for using trans fat in Oreo cookies. Kraft Foods announced a trans-fat free reformulation of Oreos shortly after the 2003 lawsuit was filed, and the lawsuit was dropped. Kraft denied that the change was made in response to the lawsuit, noting that the reformulation had been in planning long before the lawsuit.

In 2010, two California residents filed a class action lawsuit against Kraft Foods for claiming certain products are healthy when in fact they contain unhealthy trans fat. Kraft denied any wrongdoing, saying all packaging claims are true and legal. A United States district judge certified the class on June 6, 2012. The lawsuit cites current scientific consensus on the dangerous health effects of trans fat, which causes coronary heart disease and has been linked to type 2 diabetes and some forms of cancer. The American Heart Association concludes that there is "no safe level" of trans fat in the diet. On October 25, 2012, the final ruling ordered Kraft Foods Inc. to cease the use of certain phrases on packaging, for example that Honey Grahams "Support Kids' Growth and Development".

=== Political campaign ===
In 2012, Kraft contributed $1,950,500 to a $46 million political campaign known as "The Coalition Against The Costly Food Labeling Proposition, sponsored by Farmers and Food Producers" The organization was founded to oppose Proposition 37, a California citizen's initiative mandating the labeling of foods containing genetically modified ingredients. As a result, there were calls for a boycott of Kraft products.

=== Environmental record ===
For years Kraft purchased paper for its packaging from Asia Pulp & Paper, the third-largest paper producer in the world which was called a "forest criminal" for destroying "precious habitat" in Indonesia's rain forest. In 2011, when Kraft cancelled its contract with Asia Pulp & Paper, Greenpeace executive director Phil Radford commended the company for "taking rainforest conservation seriously".

== In the news ==
Kraft began a major restructuring process in January 2004, following a year of declining sales (blamed largely on the rising health consciousness of Americans) and the sacking of co-CEO Betsy Holden. The company announced closures of 19 production facilities worldwide and the reduction of 5,500 jobs, as well as the sale of 10% of its branded products.

On January 19, 2010, Kraft sealed the deal to buy 100% of the share capital of Cadbury for over $19 billion.

On March 17, 2010, Kraft Foods said it was "truly sorry" over its closure of a Cadbury factory in Somerdale. Senior Kraft executive Marc Firestone made the public apology to MPs at a parliamentary select committee hearing.

In March 2011, in the US, Kraft Foods introduced MiO, a liquid flavoring product with zero calories and sugar-free geared to 18 to 39-year-old consumers. MiO has no artificial flavors but it does have artificial colors, artificial sweeteners and artificial preservatives, unlike some competing flavoring products, according to USA Today.

In August 2011, Kraft Foods announced plans to split into two publicly traded companies—a snack food company and a grocery company.

On September 10, 2010, a disgruntled employee angered over a recent suspension, Yvonne Hiller, opened fire inside the Philadelphia factory where she had worked for 15 years. Armed with a .357 gun, Yvonne shot 3 co-workers, killing 2 of them. Philadelphia Police responded within minutes of the 911 call. SWAT took Yvonne into custody at 8:30pm.

== Recalls ==
In September 2000, up to $50 million worth of taco shells were recalled by Kraft from supermarkets and Taco Bell restaurants. The shells contained genetically modified corn, which was not approved for human consumption by the Food and Drug Administration; the recall was the first of a genetically modified food. The corn was supplied to a plant from which Kraft bought the shells.

In April 2009, Kraft Foods recalled products containing pistachios after the discovery of salmonella at one of its Illinois manufacturers. Kraft pinpointed as the source a California pistachio grower, which initially recalled over 2,000,000 pounds (910,000 kg) of nuts before broadening the recall to much of its 2008 crop. A Washington Post editorial credited the "aggressive food safety system at Kraft Foods" with effectively addressing the danger.

In September 2011, Kraft recalled over 130,000 cases of Velveeta Shells and Cheese microwaveable cups because of possible wire bristles in the cups.

== See also ==
- List of Kraft brands
- List of dairy product companies in the United States
- General Foods Corporation
- Ovson Egg
