= Liederkranz cheese =

American variety of Limburger cheese

Liederkranz is an American recreation of Limburger cheese, made subtly different by the use of a different bacterial culture for smear-ripening. Liederkranz is a cow's milk cheese, with an edible pale yellow-orange tan crust, and a semisoft, pale interior with a mildly pungent flavor and distinct aroma that could become unpleasantly ammonia-like if aged incorrectly.

Liederkranz was created in 1891 by Emil Frey (1867–1951), a young Swiss cheesemaker in Monroe, New York, who later also created Velveeta there in 1923. Frey was apprenticed to Adolph Tode, who ran the Monroe Cheese Company, as well as a New York City delicatessen. They named the cheese after a local singing society, a Liederkranz Club ("singing circle"), perhaps the famous one in New York, or perhaps just on a whim for its Germanic sound.

Until the original line went out of production, the cheese was sold in small boxes, with perforations in the sides. The return of the product sees it wrapped in aroma-proof foil. It is very similar in flavor to the French cheese Époisses.

The Monroe Cheese Company, the original source of Liederkranz, passed to new ownership, but Emil Frey stayed on and followed Liederkranz production to Van Wert, Ohio, in 1926. In 1929, the company was sold to the Borden Company. Frey retired in 1938.

At the end of 1981, after a fire damaged its Van Wert plant, Borden terminated its natural cheese lines in favor of "processed cheese". A few months later the Fisher Cheese Company purchased the Van Wert plant and began to produce Liederkranz. In 1985, bacterial contamination of a batch of Liederkranz and several other cheeses induced Fisher to withdraw Liederkranz from the market, selling the franchise and the bacterial culture to Beatrice Foods (Beatrice has since been acquired by ConAgra) and the New Zealand Dairy Board. That was the last batch of Liederkranz to be made for 25 years.

In 2010, the cheese was reintroduced by DCI Cheese Company of Richfield, Washington County, Wisconsin, which had acquired the trademark and the cultures (whose survival had been doubted during Liederkranz's long absence from the market).

Liederkranz was the favorite cheese of poet W. H. Auden, having been recommended to him by T. S. Eliot.
