= Ovson Egg =

American food processing company

Ovson Egg was an American food processing company founded in 1919 to provide frozen, canned and dried eggs to manufacturers of products such as cookies, cakes, custards, egg noodles, beverages, ice cream, macaroni, mayonnaise, salad dressing and puddings. The National Dairy Products Corporation became a majority investor in the company in 1929, and it became part of Kraft Foods in 1952.

== Founding ==
Breaking and freezing of eggs began in U.S. in the 1890s in Minneapolis, Minnesota. George Dole, who owned one of the first cold storage facilities in the United States, and former school teacher H. J. Keith were the first to open an egg-breaking business, the H.J. Keith Company. They also began separating yolks from whites and selling them as separate products. In 1898, Keith made a deal with H. A. Perry of Salina, Kansas. Perry was the founder of Seymour Foods, and had invented a hand-operated yolk-and-white separator which dramatically improved productivity. Keith licensed this technology from Perry and dramatically increased production.

Morris Ovson was a Russian citizen who emigrated to the United States in 1904 and became an American citizen in 1909. Ovson found employment as an egg candler for the H.J. Keith Company. In time, Ovson became a processing operations inspector and opened new production and processing facilities for the company. Keith also sent Ovson to Europe to learn how to produce dried eggs. In 1917, Keith sent Morris to Shanghai to open a new dried and frozen egg production company, the Amos Bird Company (which became part of The Borden Food Corporation).

But Ovson did not want to move to China. He had married the former Ida Karelitz in 1910, and the couple had three young sons (Leo, Gene, and Hank). Leo and Gene joined Morris into the frozen egg business. Morris Ovson returned to the United States in 1919, formed a business partnership with Keith, and founded the Ovson-Keith Egg Company. To secure additional capital, C. J. Bowman and W. F. Priebe became investors and associates in the firm, and the company name was changed to the Bowman-Priebe-Ovson Company.

== 1920s ==
On September 19, 1922, Morris Ovson was awarded a patent for "Mocoyolk" (U.S. Patent No. 1,429,559), a product which is 95 percent yolk and 5 percent glycerine which helps preserve the consistency of egg and keeps baked products moist.

In 1929, the Bowman-Priebe-Ovson Company was reorganized and became the Ovson Egg Company. Financial difficulties created by the Great Depression led the National Dairy Products Corporation (now Kraft Foods) to invest in the company and take a non-controlling majority interest in the firm.

== 1930s and 1940s ==
By 1937, the two largest processed egg companies in the United States were Standard Brands (which became part of Nabisco and eventually Kraft Foods) and the Ovson Egg Company. Ovson Egg had seven plants, located in Chicago, Illinois; St. Louis, Missouri; Dallas, Texas; Davenport, Iowa; Moberly, Missouri; Great Bend, Kansas; and Parsons, Kansas. The Shanghai plant was the largest egg processing facility in Asia.

As the demand for eggs products soared during World War II, Ovson Egg's profits soared. Ovson Egg was one of the few American firms which manufactured dried and powdered eggs, and it became a significant supplier of egg products to the U.S. military.

In 1948, Leo and Morris Ovson opened an Ovson Egg plant in Neosho, Missouri. The plant was built by R. A. Haas, owner of Haas Cold Storage. Haas leased space to Ovson Egg, and Haas Cold Storage handled the processed eggs.

== Sale and legal troubles ==
In 1952, Kraft Foods purchased National Dairy Products. Ovson Egg became part of Kraft, although the Ovson Egg offices remained in Chicago.

Shortly after the Kraft purchase, Morris and Leo Ovson were indicted on June 14, 1955, for perjury in a labor racketeering investigation. Both men lied to a federal grand jury about giving money to Joseph Glimco, president of Local 777 of the Taxicab Drivers Union, and to Max Podolsky, a union organizer for the Egg Inspectors Union. Joseph and Max were involved in the buying, selling, inspection and moving of eggs at the Fulton Street Egg Market in Chicago, one of the nation's largest egg trading boards. William Holloway, an accountant for Ovson Egg, was also indicted. Morris Ovson agreed to plead guilty to one charge in exchange for the district attorney dropping two additional charges against him and the lone charge against Leo Ovson. Due to his age, poor health, and retirement from the frozen egg business, Morris Ovson was not sentenced to prison but only to one year of probation.

Morris Ovson died in 1961 at the age of 77.

== Current status ==
As of 2007, Ovson Egg was still a subsidiary of Kraft Foods. It maintains offices in New York City, Kansas City, Missouri and Shanghai. Ovson Egg provides products almost exclusively for use by other Kraft subsidiaries.
