= James L. Kraft =

Canadian-American businessman (1874–1953)

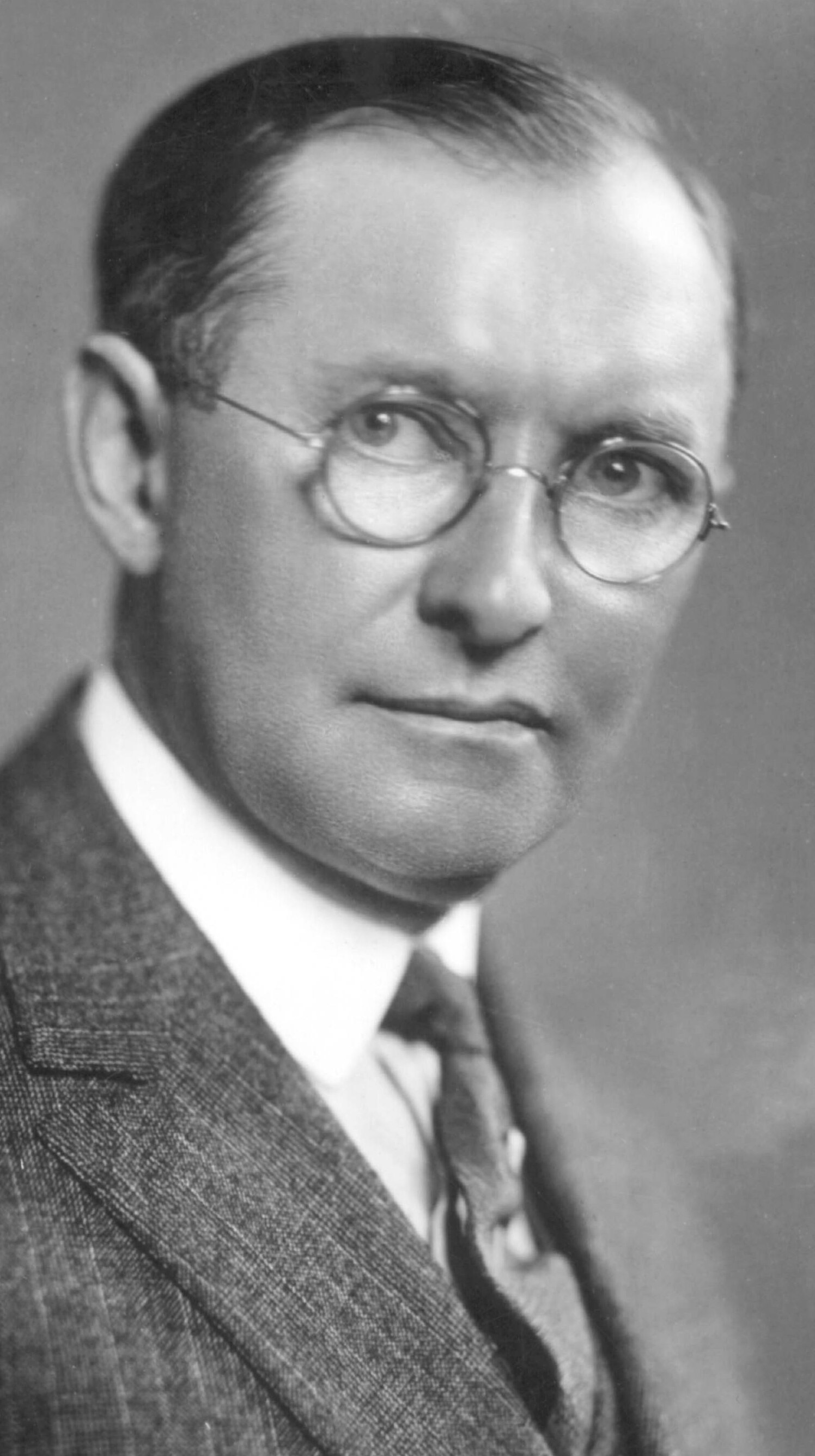
- 1934
- Born: James Lewis Kraft; December 11, 1874; Stevensville, Ontario, Canada
- Died: February 16, 1953 (aged 78); Chicago, Illinois, US
- Resting place: Memorial Park Cemetery, Skokie, Illinois, US
- Known for: Kraft Foods Inc
- Spouse: Pauline Kraft
- Children: 1

James Lewis Kraft (/ˈkræft/; December 11, 1874 – February 16, 1953) was a Canadian-American entrepreneur and inventor. Kraft emigrated to the United States from Canada in 1902 and established a wholesale cheese distribution business, J.L. Kraft & Bros. Company, in 1903. The business eventually became Kraft Foods Inc., the former multinational confectionery, food and beverage conglomerate (now succeeded by Mondelez International). He also developed a patented pasteurization process for cheese that did not require refrigeration, allowing it to be shipped long distances, and putting him among the first to patent a processed cheese.

== Life and career ==
J. L. Kraft was born on December 11, 1874, near Stevensville, Ontario, Canada, located just north of Fort Erie, to Mennonite parents Minerva Alice née Tripp (1848–1933) and George Franklin Krafft (1842–1914), a farmer of German descent. He was the second of eleven children. Kraft was educated in the Stevensville area (S.S. No. 9) and worked nearby at Ferguson's General store in Fort Erie from 1901 to 1902.

According to Ruth Kraft Anderson, daughter of Kraft's brother Will, the name was originally spelled with two fs, but Kraft decided to remove one f when he began the company.

Kraft immigrated to Buffalo, New York (directly across the Niagara River from Fort Erie), in 1902, taking a position as secretary and treasurer of the Shefford Cheese Company. He became a partner in the company the following year, but his partners abruptly dissolved the agreement while he was on a business trip to Chicago—either to inspect the local branch of the company or to supervise it. Stranded, Kraft used his remaining $65 in capital (equivalent to $1,900 in 2024) to rent a horse and wagon and established a business that bought cheese wholesale and sold it to local grocers. A year later, he would write to a friend: "I haven't got a comparatively large business now, but I know what I can do and in less than five years I am honest in saying I expect to have one of the best wholesale cheese businesses in this City." His business faltering, company tradition has it that Kraft decided to "make God a partner" in his business in 1907; as business improved in the next few years, he brought his brothers Charles Herbert, Frederick, Norman and John Henry into the business.

In 1914, J.L. Kraft & Bros. Company, which later became Kraft Foods Inc., opened its first cheese manufacturing plant in Stockton, Illinois. Kraft developed a process, patented in 1916, for pasteurizing cheese so that it would resist spoiling and could be shipped long distances. The company grew quickly, expanding into Canada in 1919. Kraft saw a large increase in business during World War I when the United States government provided cheese in tins to their armed forces.

J. L. Kraft served as the company's president from 1909 until his death in 1953. Over the years, Kraft introduced many innovative products and used progressive marketing techniques to make his company one of North America's leading food producers. The company introduced Miracle Whip in 1933 at the Century of Progress World's Fair.

Kraft was an amateur jewelry maker and would look for unpolished jade on the road, which he would shape, polish, and set into rings. The rings were then given as awards to outstanding employees, and they often became family heirlooms. Kraft even wrote a book on jewelry called Adventure in Jade and owned jade mines in Alaska and California. He was "deeply involved" in the North Shore Baptist Church in Chicago and was also a "strong proponent of religious education for young people".

In the mid-1920s, Kraft began a venture to create a fashionable golf and tennis resort community in Lake Wales, Florida, along with Carl and Bertha Hinshaw. The Florida land bust and the stock market crash in October 1929 spelled the end of the Kraft connection. The Chalet Suzanne opened in 1931, the worst year of the Great Depression, and has been run by successive generations of the Hinshaw family ever since. Even though Kraft bowed out of the development, a 1920s-era Spanish Revival house on the property continues to be called the Kraft House.

=== Kraftwood ===
In 1926, Kraft Foods opened a manufacturing plant in Antigo, Wisconsin. At the time there was a train route running from the north woods to Chicago which facilitated both industrial shipping and personal transport for the area. It reminded Kraft so much of his childhood home that he decided to purchase some land there. This decision would lead to building a sprawling estate, and spending his summers there with his wife Pauline, his family and friends. Kraftwood was built along the edge of Lake Mashkinosiew, just 20 miles north of downtown Antigo.

Kraft was a close friend of the president and founder of the Orange Crush company, C. J. Howel. Howel, his wife and daughter Annie Jo spent every summer at Kraftwood from 1927 to at least 1934.

== Personal life ==
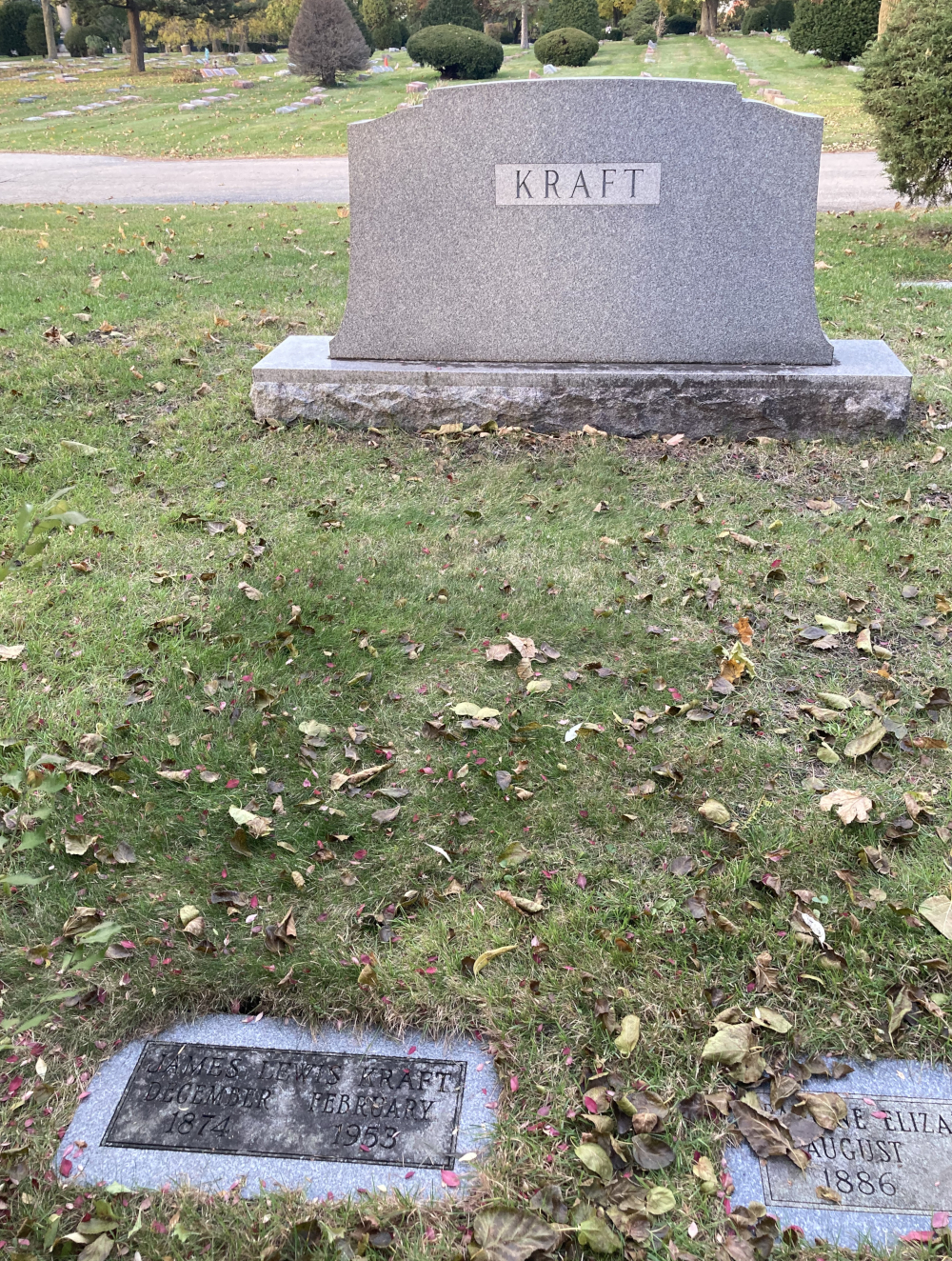
Kraft's grave at Memorial Park Cemetery

J. L. Kraft and his wife Pauline had one daughter, Edith (c. 1916–2012). The Krafts' home, built in 1930 by architect Abraham Epstein, stands at 17 Canterbury Court in Wilmette, Illinois. Kraft has living family members in Illinois and in Fort Erie, Ontario.

A few of Kraft's brothers, including Charles Herbert, Frederick, Norman and John Henry, were executives in Kraft Foods.

The Kraft family farm (located at Bowen Road at Winger Road) in Stevensville, Ontario, still exists, as the area has remained agricultural.

Kraft died on February 16, 1953, at the Wesley Memorial Hospital in Chicago. He is interred in the Memorial Park Cemetery in Skokie, Illinois.

== Legacy ==
Kraft was born in the house at 3347 Bowen Road in Fort Erie. Known as the Kraft House, it was built on land farmed by Francis Kraft, who sold the land to Kraft's father, George Krafft. The site was designated under the Ontario Heritage Act in 2003 by the town of Fort Erie in recognition of Kraft's achievements in founding and building one of North America's largest companies.
