= Velveeta Shells & Cheese =

Brand name stovetop pasta shells and cheese product

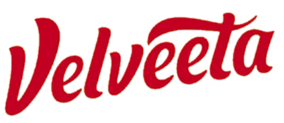
- Product type: Pasta and cheese
- Current owner: Kraft Heinz
- Produced by: Kraft Foods
- Country: United States
- Introduced: 1984; 42 years ago
- Related brands: Kraft Dinner
- Website: kraftheinz.com/velveeta

Velveeta Shells & Cheese is a shell pasta and cheese sauce food product that debuted in the United States in 1984, as part of the Velveeta brand products. Its ingredients, texture, and flavor are very similar to macaroni and cheese. The product is a shelf-stable food.

== Varieties ==
The product is prepared in original style, 2% milk style and in chipotle and jalapeño flavors. The product prepared with 2% milk in the cheese sauce contains 50% less fat compared to the original product. The flavored varieties are packaged with separate packets, one with flavoring and one with the cheese sauce. The jalapeño-flavored product has been described as being significantly spicy in flavor. The chipotle-flavored product has been described as strong in flavor, per the chipotle, Mexican seasonings and cumin in the product. The flavored varieties have the word "bold" on the packaging in all capitalized, bold lettering. A large-shelled version, mini-shelled version, rotini spiral pasta version, a whole grain version, and a bacon version are also produced. A variant containing “mild peppers and picante sauce” labeled as Touch of Mexico was sold alongside the bacon variant as early as 1991, but is no longer available as of February 2020.

== Ingredients ==
Velveeta Shells & Cheese is a shell pasta product prepared with enriched wheat flour and a milk-based cheese sauce. Additional primary ingredients in the cheese sauce include whey, water, whey protein concentrate and milk protein concentrate. The product contains under two percent of lactic acid, sodium alginate, sorbic acid, oleoresin, and other ingredients.

== Nutritional information ==
Velveeta Shells & Cheese
Nutritional value per 4 oz.
- Energy: 360 kcal (1,500 kJ)
- Carbohydrates: 46g
- Fat: 13g
- Protein: 15g
- ^{†}Percentages estimated using US recommendations for adults.

Per a single serving of the original product, Velveeta Shells & Cheese has 360 calories, 117 calories from fat, 13g total fat, 8g saturated fat, 30g cholesterol, 960 mg sodium, 46g total carbohydrate, 2g fiber and 15g protein.

== Production and marketing ==
Kraft Foods introduced Velveeta cheese products in 1927 after acquiring the brand from The Velveeta Cheese Company. Kraft headquarters was previously located in Northfield, Illinois. Kraft Foods were made at around 160 manufacturing facilities around the world. Kraft Foods and Heinz merged in early July 2015, forming the new company The Kraft Heinz Company.

As of January 2016, Velveeta Shells & Cheese is still marketed on a Kraft website. On the Kraft Foods website, multiple recipes and cooking ideas for Velveeta Shells & Cheese are also posted.

Prior to the corporate merger of Kraft Foods and Heinz, Kraft also marketed Velveeta Shells & Cheese through multiple television commercials and magazine advertisements. In March 2015, the product continued to be advertised on television in the United States, with statements referring to the product as "liquid gold."

== Packaging ==
Velveeta Shells & Cheese is mass-produced and packaged in individual, single serving packages, in boxes and in family size packages.

In 2012, Kraft Foods received some questions from Consumer Reports about the packaging style for single-serving Velveeta Shells & Cheese, whereby the container is not full of product, and after the product is prepared, not much food is present relative to the size of the packaging. A video denoting the Consumer Reports query showed a container that was only around half full after the single-serving container was cooked in a microwave oven. A news report about the matter stated, "once you're done making it, look how little food is actually inside," in reference to the single-serving container. Consumer Reports has referred to this type of packaging as a "packaging gotcha," via the downsizing of product volumes. The news report stated that such types packaging is "deceptive", and implied that this is a tactic to mislead consumers into thinking they're getting more food than actually exists in the package. The company responded stating that it "leaves room for water in the Velveeta Shells n' Cheese and that noodles expand."

== See also ==
- Velveeta
- Kraft Dinner
- List of cheese dishes
- List of pasta dishes
