= Marye Dahnke =

Marye Dahnke (August 1897 – February 1980) was an American home economist who worked for the Kraft Foods corporation, being one of the first women to work in the food industry in that role.

A Southerner, Dahnke was born to George and Eleanora (Hoffman) Dahnke in Union City, Tennessee, located in Obion County. Her father was a businessman and entrepreneur. She was an early home economist who became the Director of the Home Economics Department of the Kraft-Phenix Cheese Corp., later Kraft Cheese Co., Chicago, Illinois for almost 40 years.

According to her Kraft biography, Marye was educated at Columbia University, taught at the University of Tennessee and after starting at Kraft in the 1920s, became a home economist for Kraft Foods Group, then known as Kraft-Phenix Cheese Corp. She was known as an early female food marketer who promoted cheese by hosting "cheese talks" nationwide. and for authoring two popular cookbooks, The Cheese Cookbook (1942),Marye Dahnke's Salad Book (Pocket Books, 1960), and she authored pamphlets for Kraft, such as "Cheese and Ways to Serve It" (1931).

Dahnke commented on the complexity of her role, in that she had to both advocate for her company to the consumer, as well as advocate for the consumer to her company. She said, “I decided that I wanted to be, first and foremost, a business woman....And secondly, to be a factor, however small, in the food business, so that I could use the knowledge I had of foods in selling goods. This was a most worthy ambition, but the job which might fulfill my desire was still to be made.”
