= Kraft Mayo =

Mayonnaise brand

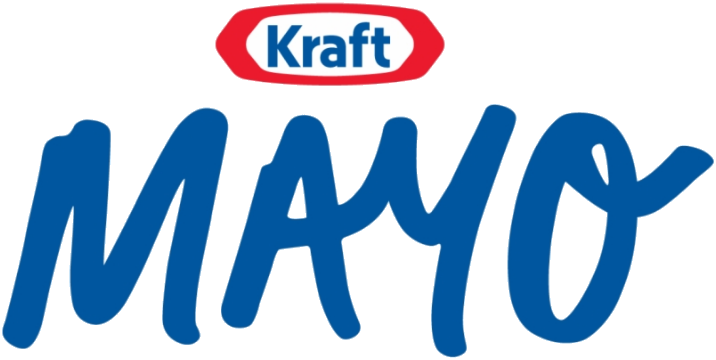
- Product type: Mayonnaise
- Current owner: Kraft Heinz
- Produced by: Kraft Foods
- Country: U.S.
- Introduced: 1930; 96 years ago

Kraft Mayonnaise or Kraft Mayo is a brand of mayonnaise made by Kraft Foods. It is made in many forms and flavors. A new line of the brand's flavored mayonnaises are launched with a celebrity-based ad campaign by HGTV's Design Star judges Candice Olson, Genevieve Gorder and Vern Yip.

== History ==
Kraft Mayo was introduced in 1930, before Kraft's similar product, Miracle Whip, which was launched in 1933. When Kraft Mayo was first launched, Kraft announced a blind taste test: Americans who preferred the taste of Kraft Mayo over Miracle Whip. The preferred winner was Kraft Mayo. In 1993, Kraft Mayo flavors expanded with light and fat-free options. In 2002, Kraft Mayo created other bottle shapes like squeeze containers and all-out versions of the brand. In 2008, Kraft released a new mayonnaise with olive oil, called "Kraft Mayo with olive oil." Kraft Mayo with olive oil has 50% less fat and fewer calories than regular Kraft Mayo. In 2012, Kraft Mayo Homestyle was produced; a full-fat mayonnaise that is thicker, richer, and slightly more yellow in color than Kraft Mayo.

== Flavors ==
- Kraft Real Mayonnaise
- Kraft Light Mayonnaise-Same as the original version, but with fewer calories and less fat.
- Kraft Fat-Free Mayonnaise
- Kraft Mayo with olive oil-Recent flavor of Kraft Mayo. This flavor is the same as the regular version, but made with olive oil and thus has less fat and fewer calories than the regular version of Kraft Mayo.
- Kraft Mayo with avocado oil
- Kraft Homestyle Mayonnaise

== See also ==
- List of mayonnaises
