= Stevensville, Ontario =

Stevensville
- Unincorporated community
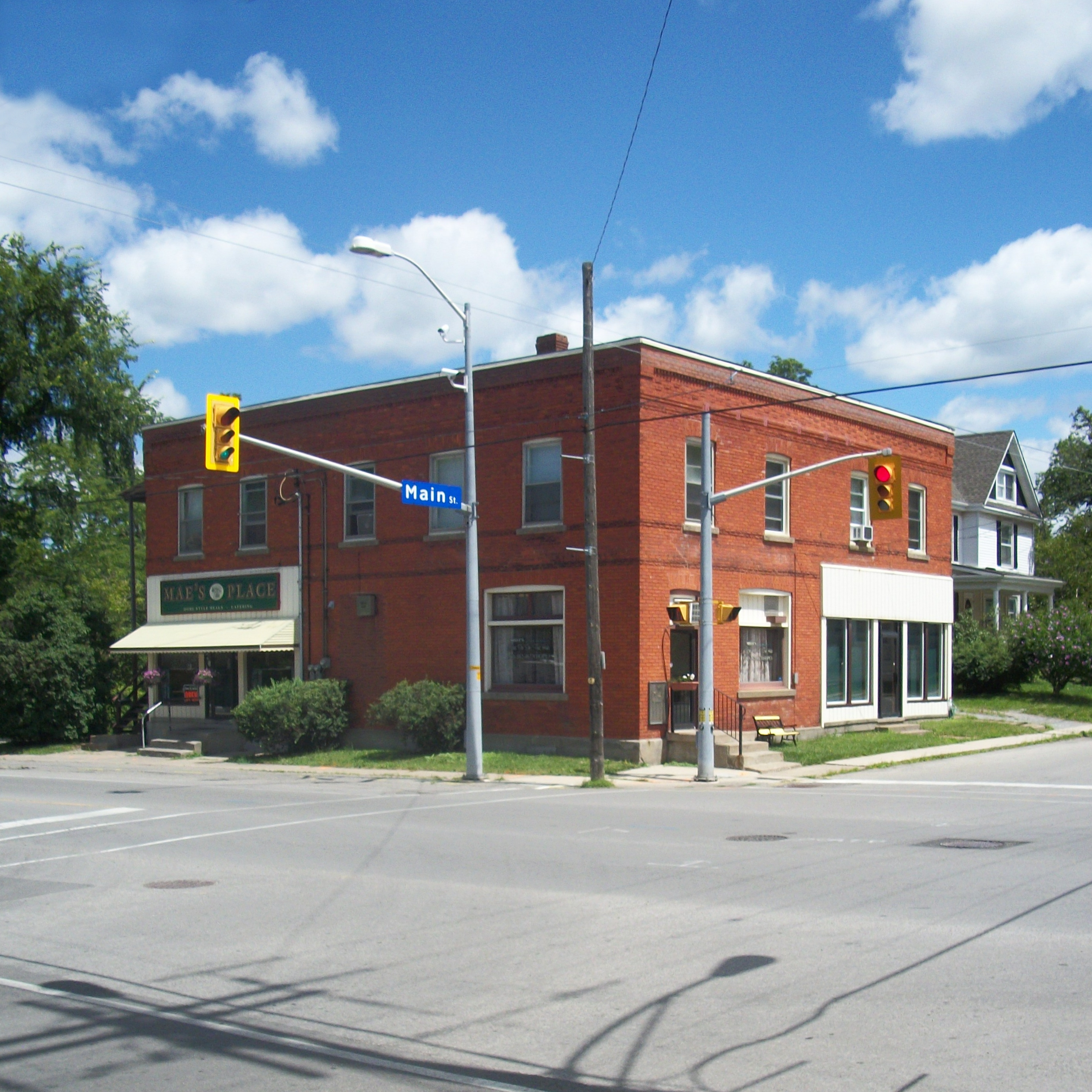
- Interactive map of Stevensville
- Coordinates: 42°56′38″N 79°3′33″W
- Country: Canada
- Province: Ontario
- Regional municipality: Niagara
- Town: Fort Erie
- Time zone: UTC-5 (EST)
  - Summer (DST): UTC-4 (EDT)
- Forward sortation area: L0S 1S0
- Area codes: 905 and 289
- NTS Map: 030L14
- GNBC Code: FCSJS

Stevensville is a small community in southern Ontario, Canada in the town of Fort Erie, most notable as the birthplace of Canadian entrepreneur James L. Kraft.

== Economy ==
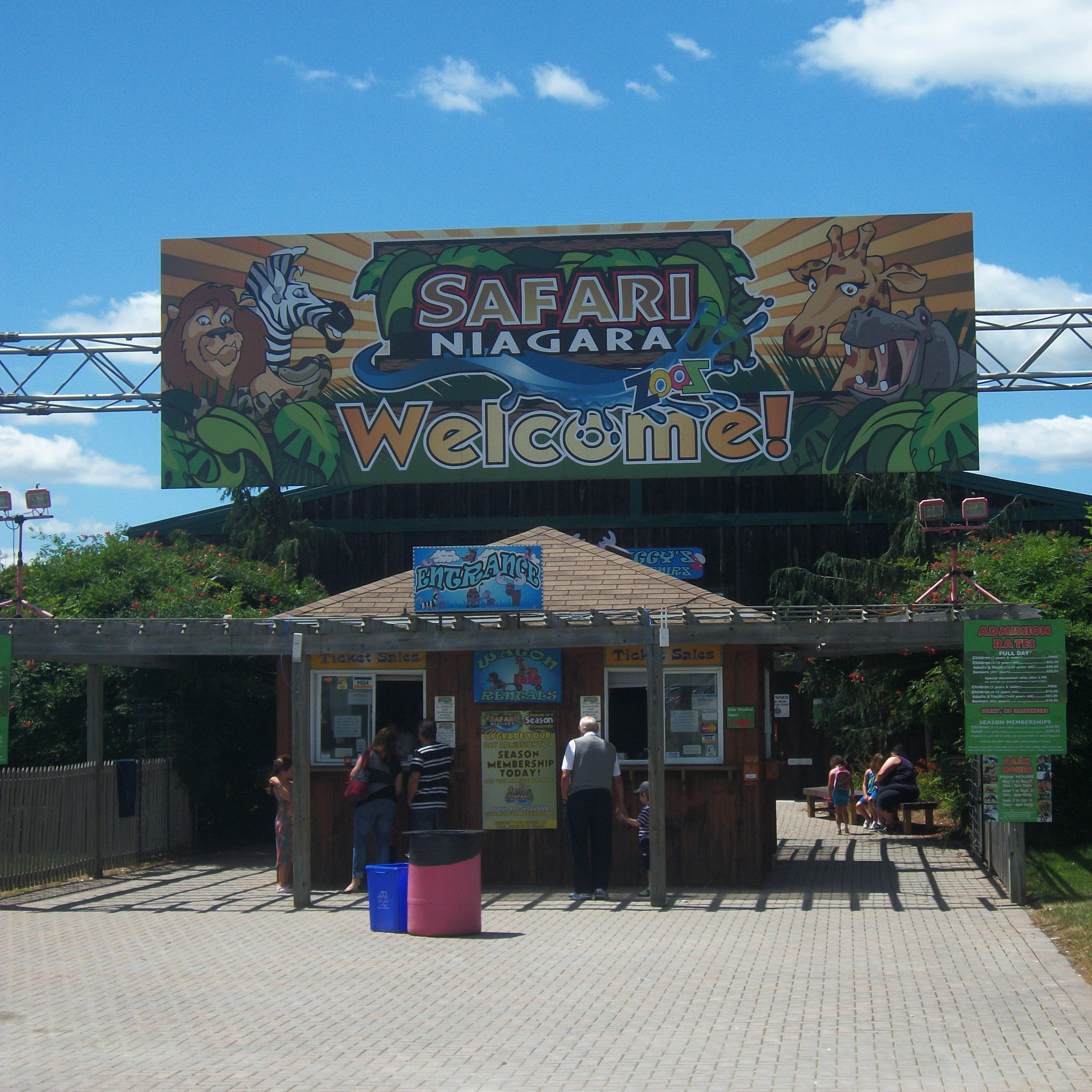
Safari Niagara is an important visitor attraction in Stevensville.

The centre of the community is the intersection of Stevensville Road and Main Street. Stevensville is home to several small shops and restaurants including Mae's Place, Scuttlebutt Tap & Eatery, Bertie Tire Centre, Lane's Restaurant, Stevensville Pallet Project, a local wood artist, Stevensville Garden Gallery, Construction companies like Gibbons Contracting, Circle P Paving, Peters Excavating, Niagara Industrial Maintenance, Jazzy Scoops which is one of the best ice cream places in the country with over 60 flavors etc. Nomad Drum Cases, who manufactures cases for drummers, which are exported globally. Stevensville is also the home of EMD Music Inc's Canadian office, an international full line music distributor. Their head office is in Brussels, Belgium.

The community of Stevensville is also home to Safari Niagara, a 100-acre (0.40 km^{2}) location featuring numerous exotic animals. Safari Niagara also has an outdoor amphitheater that hosts live concerts.

== Geography ==
Situated a few kilometres north of Lake Erie, and a short drive from Niagara Falls, Stevensville is surrounded primarily by agricultural land. Much wildlife can be sighted throughout the rural sections. There are many opportunities to experience the outdoors in Stevensville. Black Creek runs through the area which is often used for kayaking and canoeing, with a boat launch at the end of Main Street.

== Notable people ==
- James L. Kraft, inventor of processed cheese and founder of the multibillion-dollar J.L. Kraft & Bros. Company, which later became Kraft Foods Inc.
- Michael Fonfara, musician (blues, rock and pop keyboardist)
- Ron Sider, theologian and social activist
- Matt Thiessen, musician (Christian rock)
- Nick Weglarz, former professional baseball outfielder, played in the 2008 Summer Olympics
