= Kraft Foods =

American food and beverage company

Kraft Foods Group, Inc.

- Kraft Foods headquarters in Northfield, IL, as seen in 2012
- Type: Division
- Traded as: Nasdaq: KRFT
- ISIN: US50076Q1067
- Industry: Food processing
- Predecessor: Kraft Foods Inc.
- Founded: October 1, 2012; 14 years ago
- Defunct: July 2, 2015; 11 years ago (as a company)
- Fate: Merged with Heinz to form Kraft Heinz, remaining as a division
- Successor: Kraft Heinz
- Headquarters: Chicago, Illinois, United States
- Area served: Worldwide
- Products: List of products
- Number of employees: 22,500 (2015)
- Parent: Kraft Heinz

Kraft Foods Group, Inc. was an American food manufacturing and processing conglomerate, split from Kraft Foods Inc. on October 1, 2012, and was headquartered in Chicago, Illinois. It became part of Kraft Heinz on July 2, 2015, after merging with Heinz. The merger was arranged by Heinz owners Berkshire Hathaway and 3G Capital, and was completed on July 2, 2015, forming Kraft Heinz, the fifth-largest food and beverage company in the world.

== History ==
=== Spinoff of Kraft Foods Group from Kraft Foods Inc. ===
In August 2011, Kraft Foods Inc. announced plans to split into two publicly traded companies—a snack food company and a grocery company. On April 2, 2012, Kraft Foods Inc. announced that it had filed a Form 10 Registration Statement to the SEC to split the company into two companies to serve the "North American grocery business".

On October 1, 2012, Kraft Foods Inc. spun off its North American grocery business to a new company called Kraft Foods Group, Inc. The remainder of Kraft Foods Inc. was renamed Mondelēz International, Inc., and was refocused as an international snack and confection company. Burt P. Flickinger III of Strategic Resource Group said the strategy "worked for Mondelez, but not for Kraft".

On November 19, 2013, an arbitration ruling ordered Starbucks to pay Kraft Foods Inc. $2.7 billion because of an early contract termination. The money would go to Mondelēz International, Inc.

In October 2013, Kraft announced that it would remove artificial dyes from three macaroni and cheese varieties made in kid-friendly shapes, but not its plain elbow-shaped Kraft Macaroni and Cheese product with "original flavor". This was in response to a petition by activist Vani Hari and blogger Lisa Leake who delivered a petition to the company to remove controversial synthetic dyes Yellow 5 (labeled as Tartrazine) and Yellow 6 from its signature macaroni and cheese products.

In August 2014, Kraft announced an agreement with McDonald's to sell its McCafé brand of coffee in grocery stores starting in 2015.

=== Kraft and Heinz merger ===
On March 25, 2015, Kraft Foods Group Inc. announced that it would merge with the H.J. Heinz Company, owned by 3G Capital and Berkshire Hathaway Inc. Kraft's shares rose about 17 percent in premarket trading after the announcement of the deal, which will bring Heinz back to the public market following its takeover over two years prior. The companies completed the merger on July 2, 2015.

In 2025, Kraft Heinz confirmed that they will be spending $3 billion on its U.S. manufacturing facilities, adding 3,500 employees to the Lunchables producer's workforce.

== Sponsorships and promotions ==
Kraft is an official partner and sponsor of both Major League Soccer and the National Hockey League. Since 2006, Kraft Foods has sponsored Kraft Hockeyville, a reality television series produced by CBC/SRC Sports, in which communities demonstrate their commitment to the sport of ice hockey in a contest revolving around the theme of community spirit. The winning community gets a cash prize dedicated to upgrading their hometown arena, as well as the opportunity to host an NHL preseason game. In 2007, it was then relegated to segments aired during Hockey Night in Canada. In 2015, Kraft Hockeyville was expanded to the United States with a separate competition for communities there.

From 2002 to 2014, Kraft sponsored the Kraft Nabisco Championship, one of the four "majors" on the LPGA tour. The company also sponsored the Kraft Fight Hunger Bowl, a post-season college football bowl game, from 2010 to 2012.

== Brands ==
The old Kraft logo still seen on some Kraft-branded products

The new Kraft logo used since its soft-launch in April 2024 on few products

The company's core businesses are in beverage, cheese, dairy foods, snack foods, and convenience foods. Kraft's major brands include:

- A.1.
- Boca Burger
- Capri-Sun (U.S. Licensee)
- Claussen pickles
- Gevalia
- Grey Poupon
- Jell-O
- Jet-Puffed Marshmallows
- Kool-Aid
- Kraft
  - Kraft Dinner
  - Kraft Singles
  - Kraft Mayo
  - Kraft Ketchup
  - Kraft Dressings
- Lunchables
- Maxwell House
- Oscar Mayer
- Philadelphia Cream Cheese
- Primal Kitchen
- Pudliszki
- RIDG's Finer Foods, licensing name used by Kraft addressing Bull's-Eye Barbecue Sauce
- Seven Seas – salad dressings
- Velveeta

== See also ==
- List of Kraft brands
- List of dairy product companies in the United States
- General Foods
- Ovson Egg
