= List of spreads =

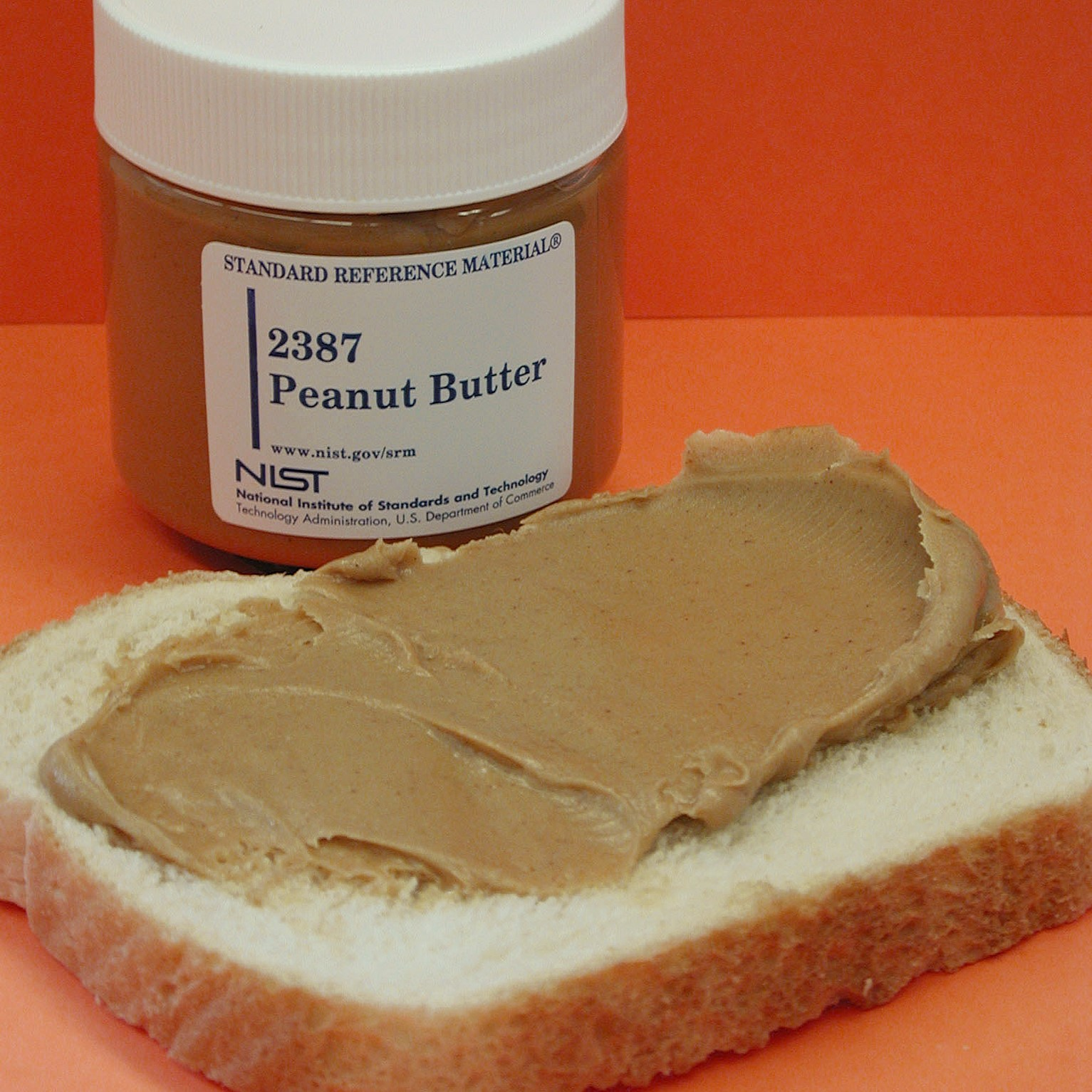
Peanut butter spread on white bread

This is a list of spreads. A spread is a food that is literally spread, generally with a knife, onto food items such as bread or crackers. Spreads are added to food to enhance the flavour or texture of the food.

== Spreads ==
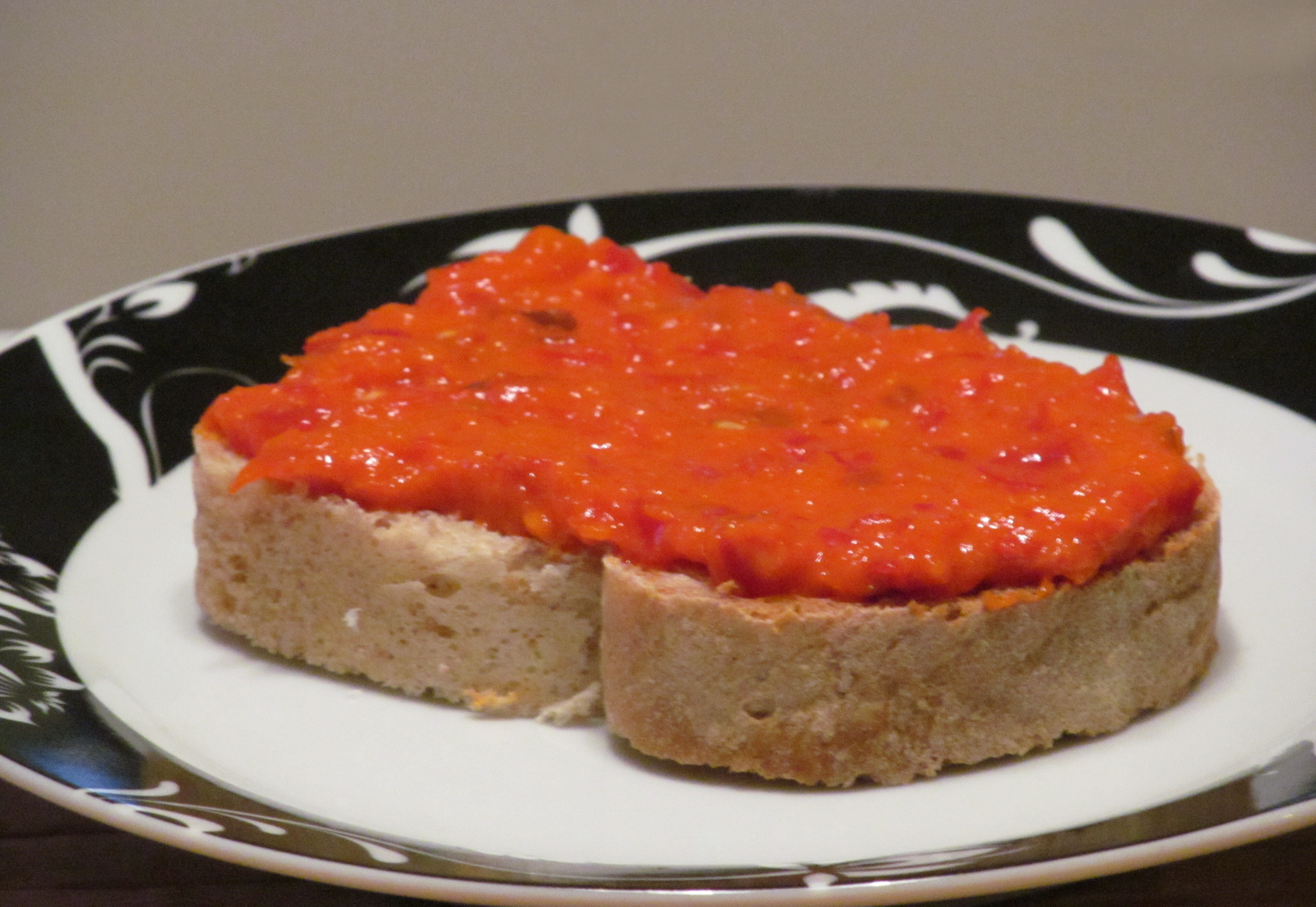
Ajvar atop bread

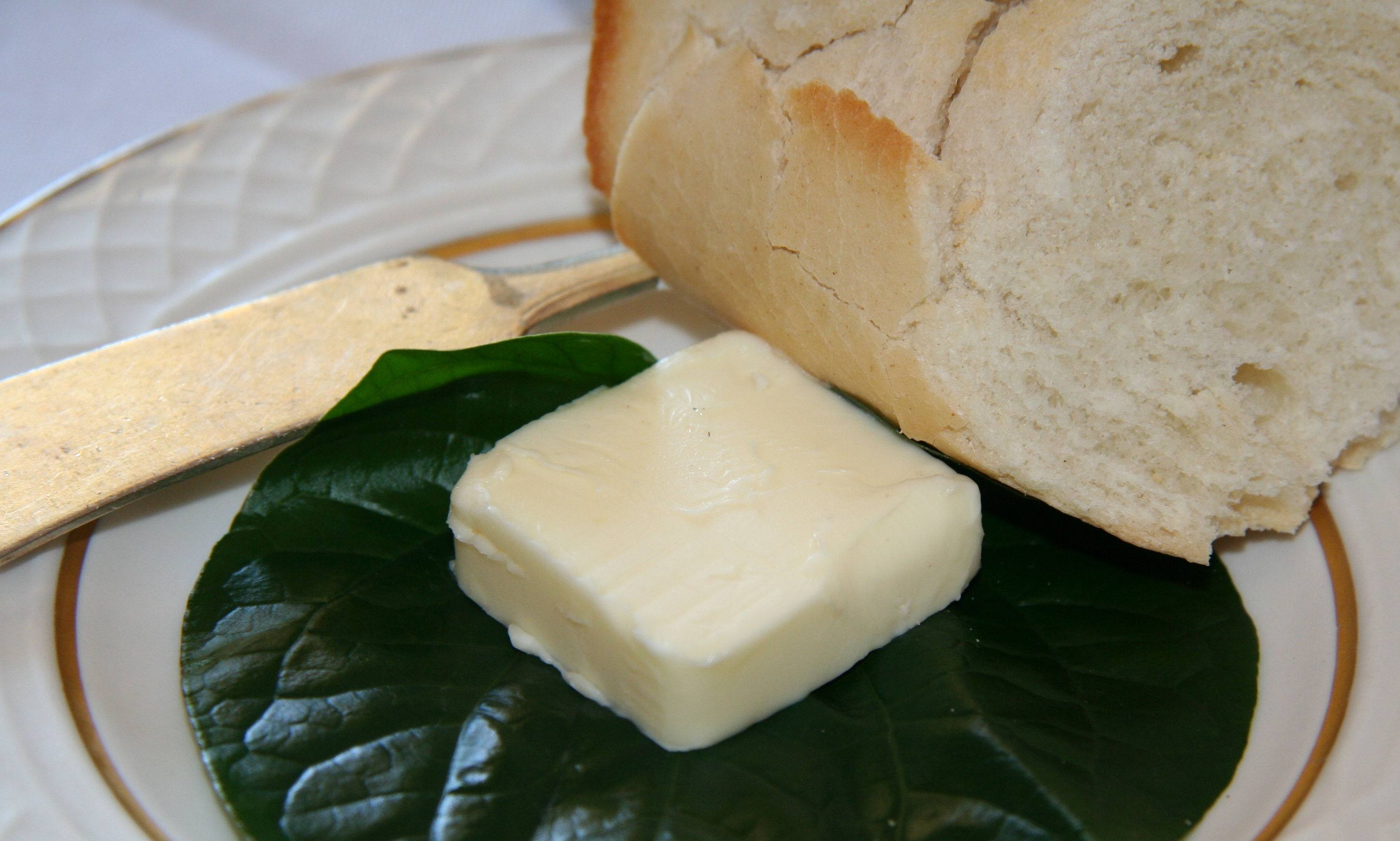
Butter is often served for spreading on bread with a butter knife.

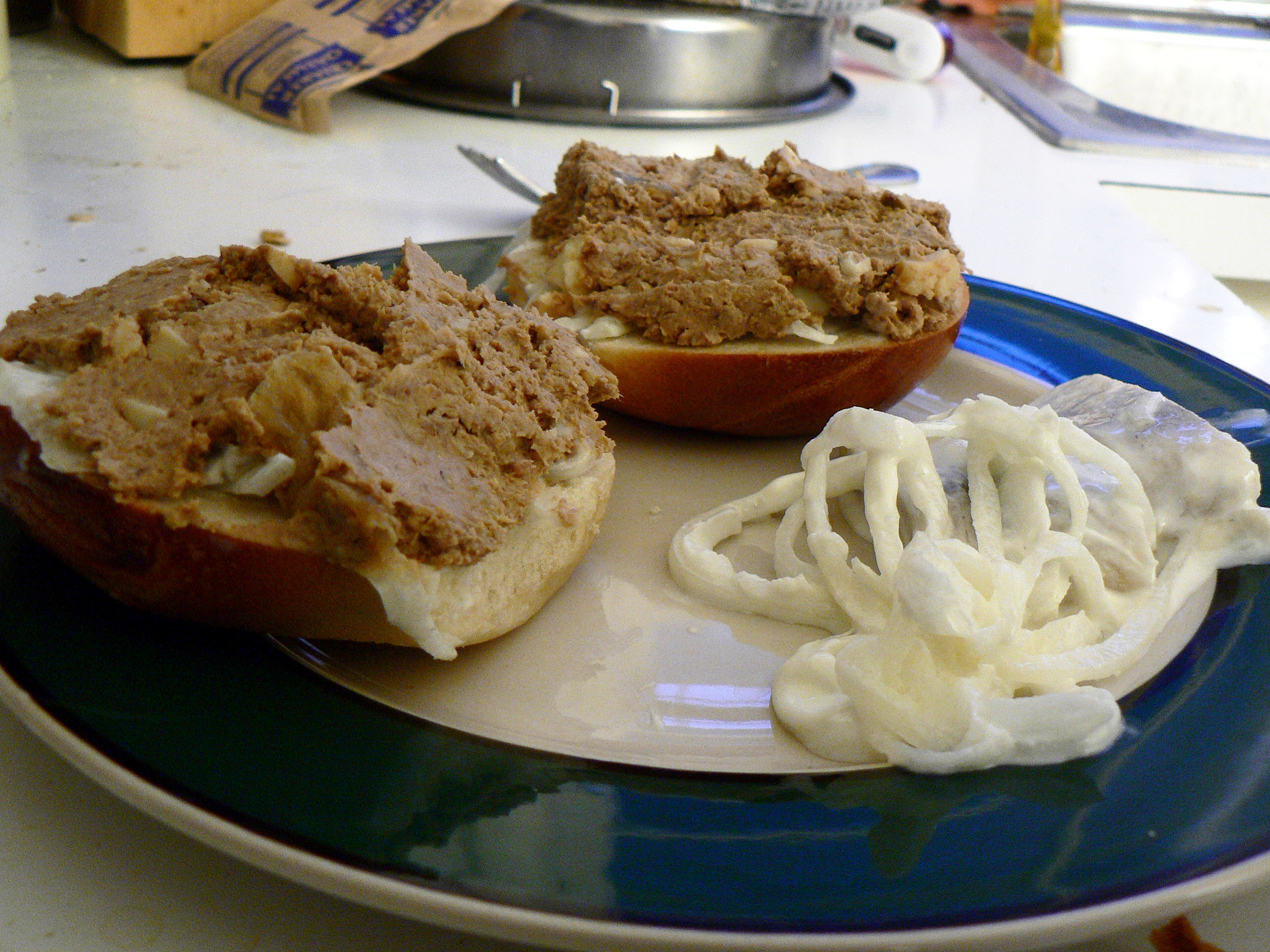
Chopped liver on bread

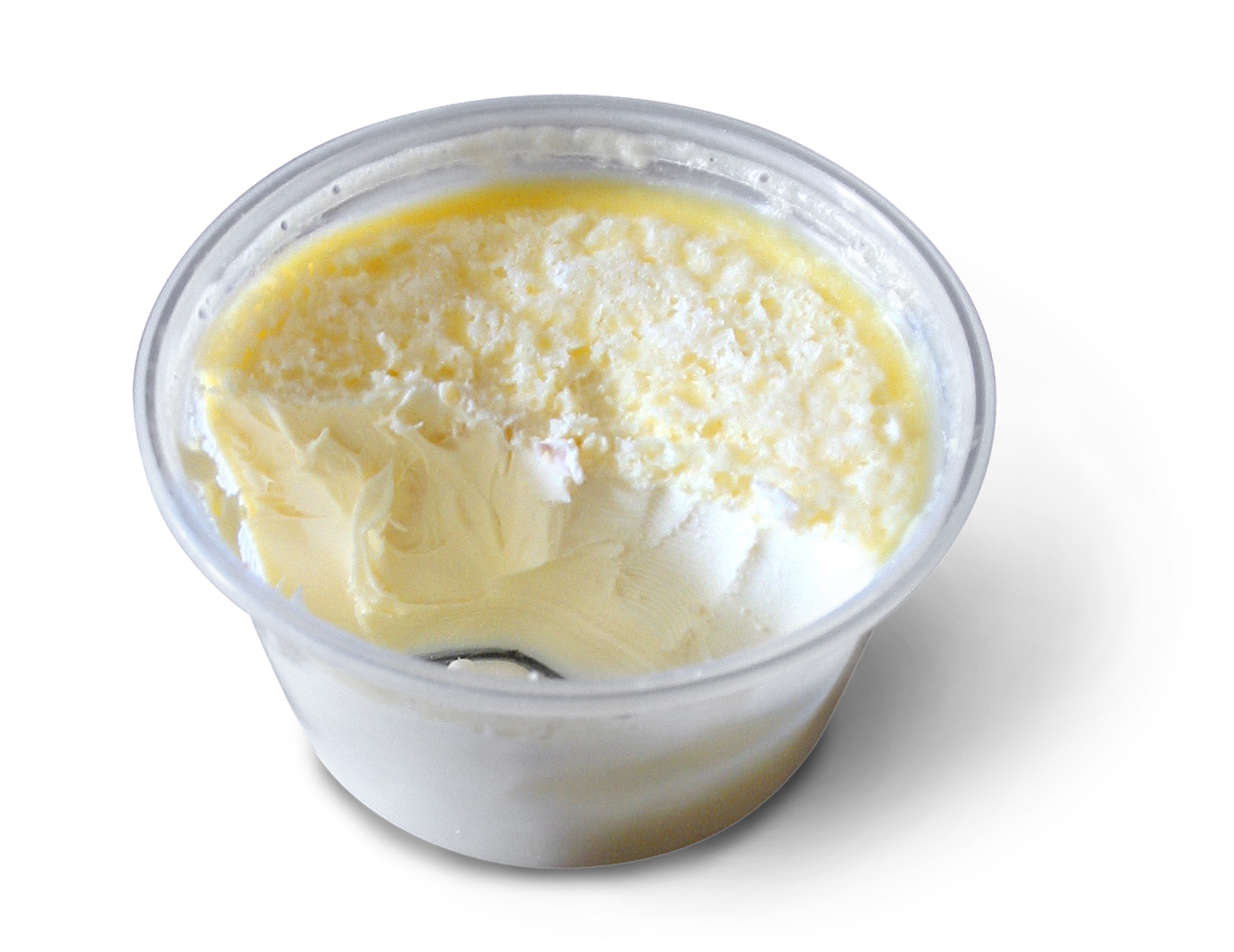
Clotted cream

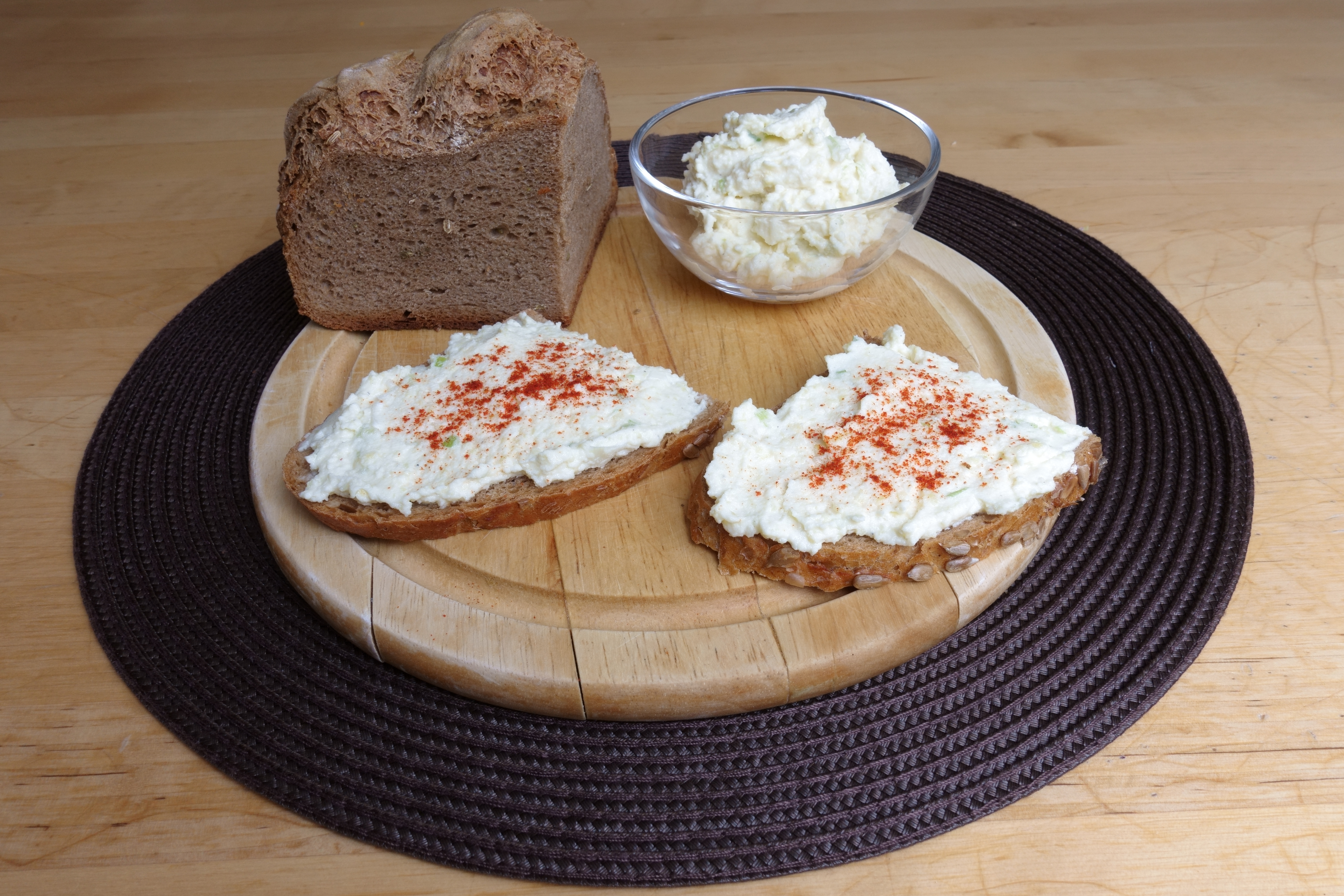
Kartoffelkäse atop bread

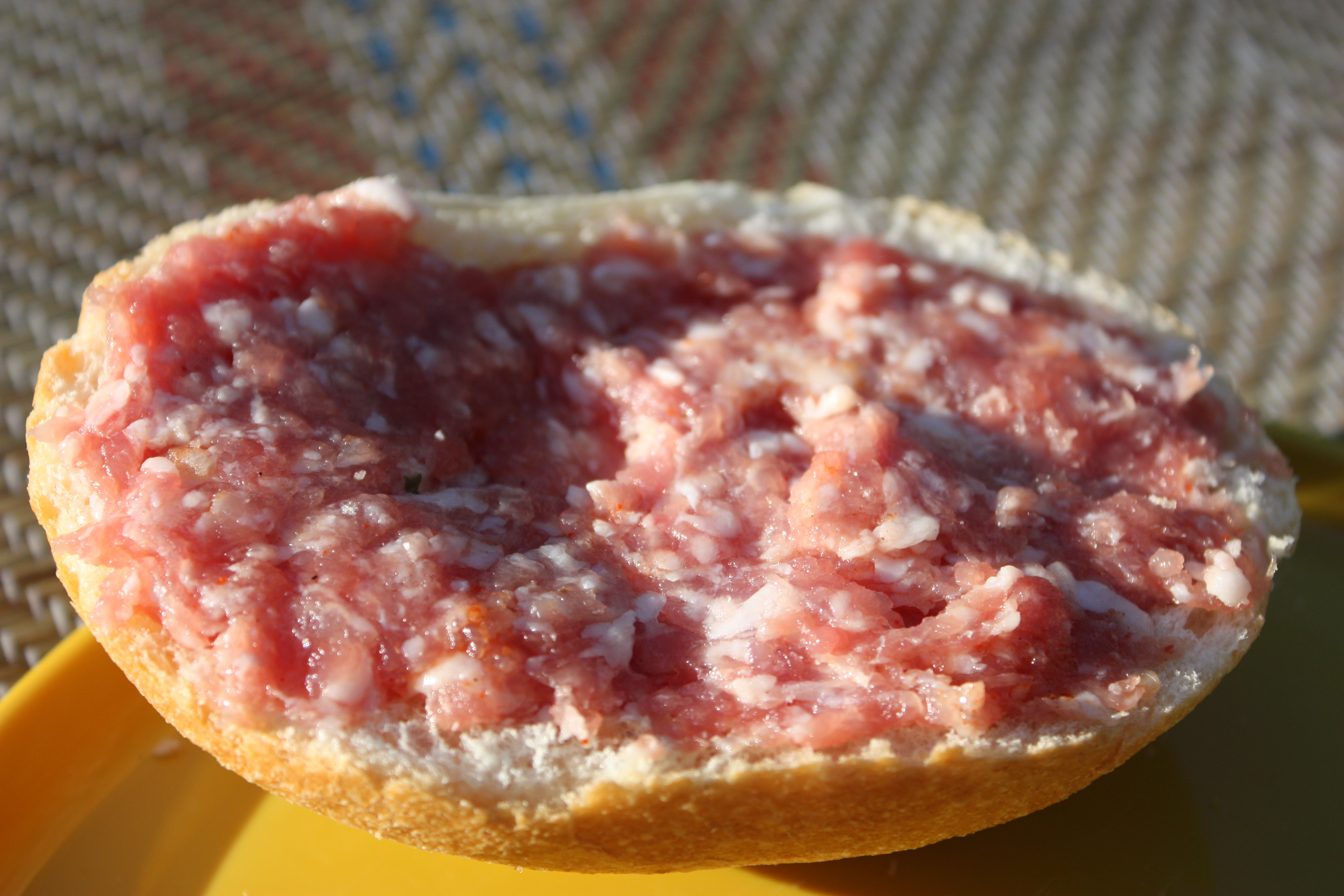
Mettbrötchen as served in Germany

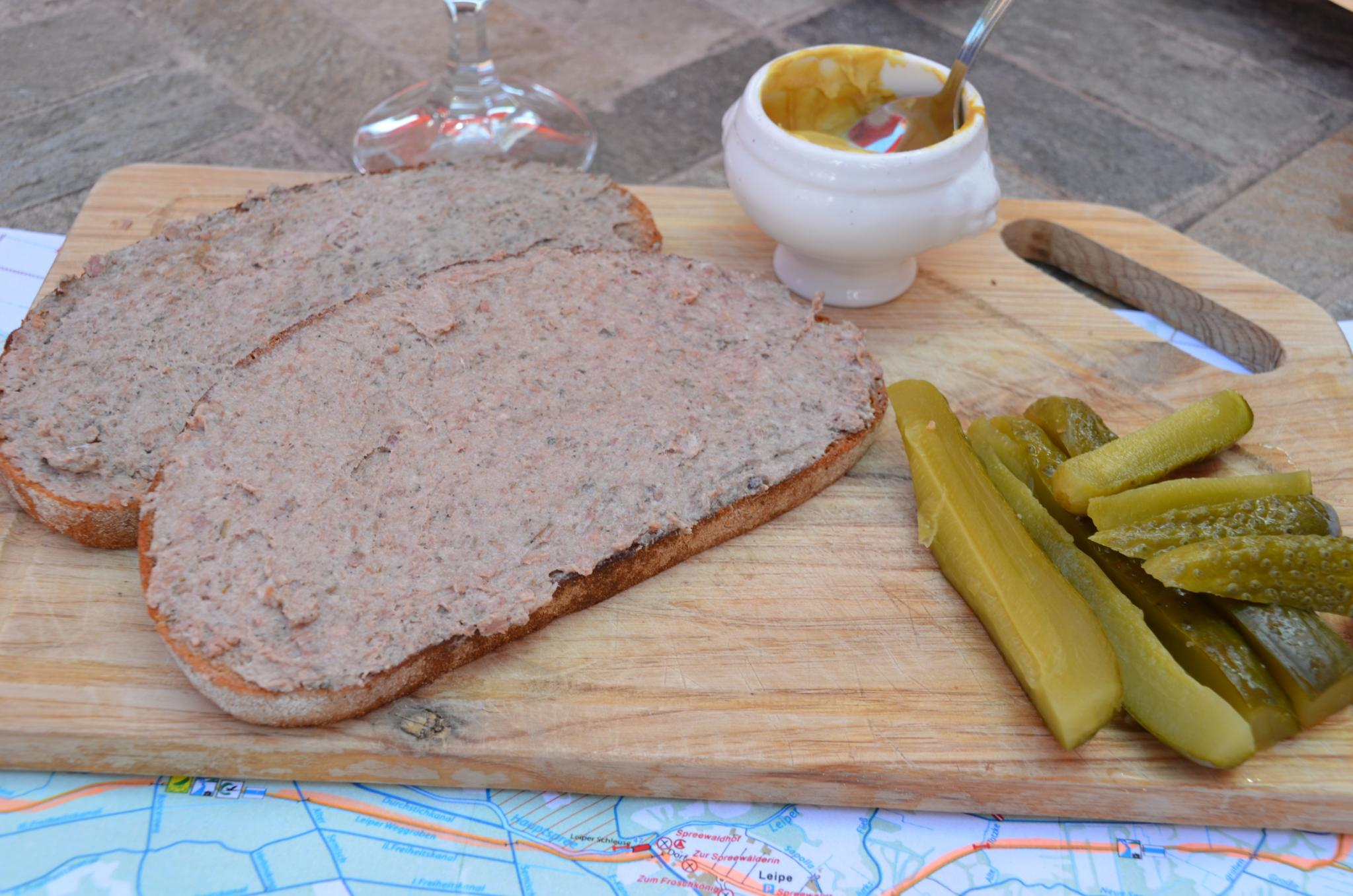
Liverwurst

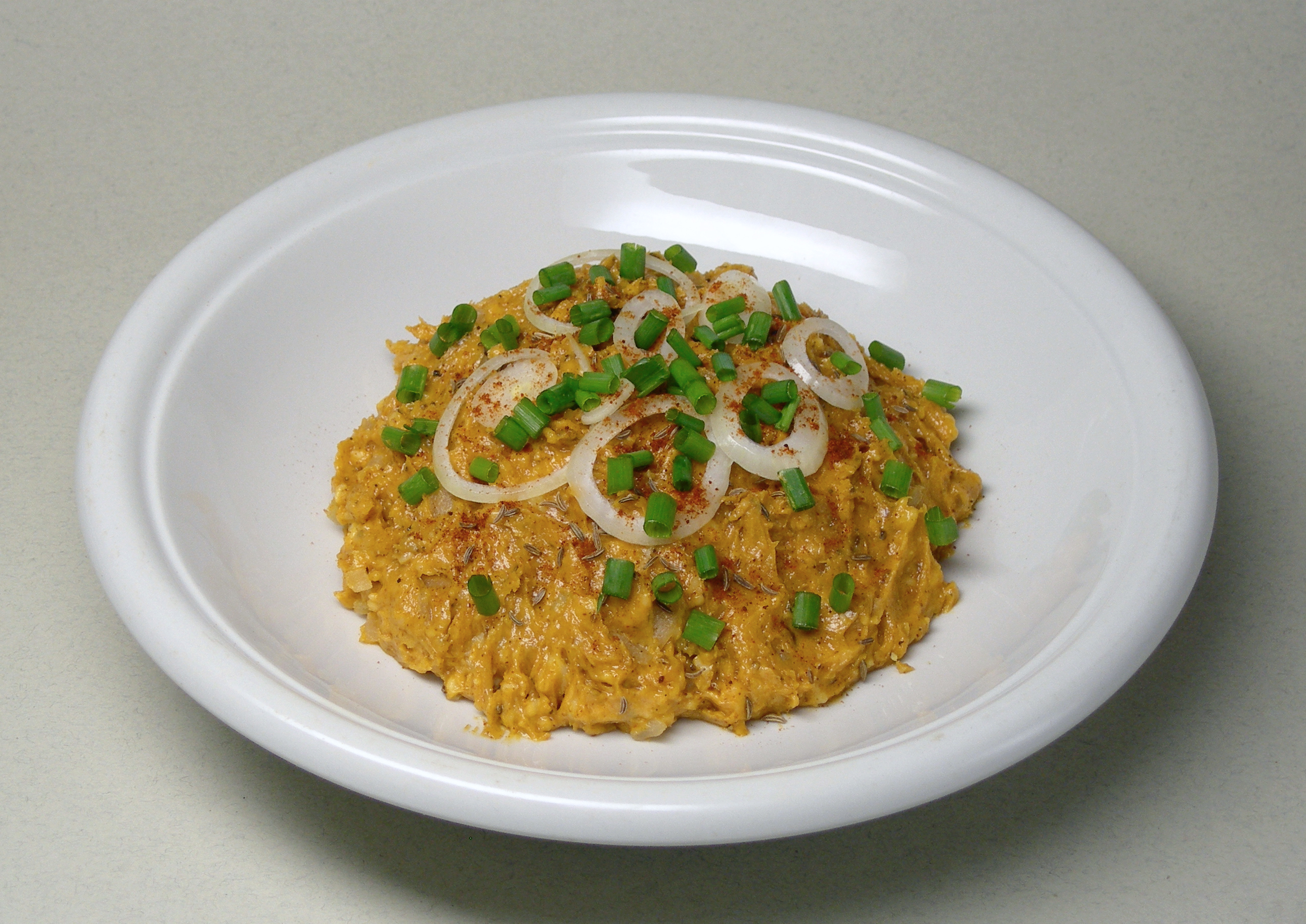
Obatzda

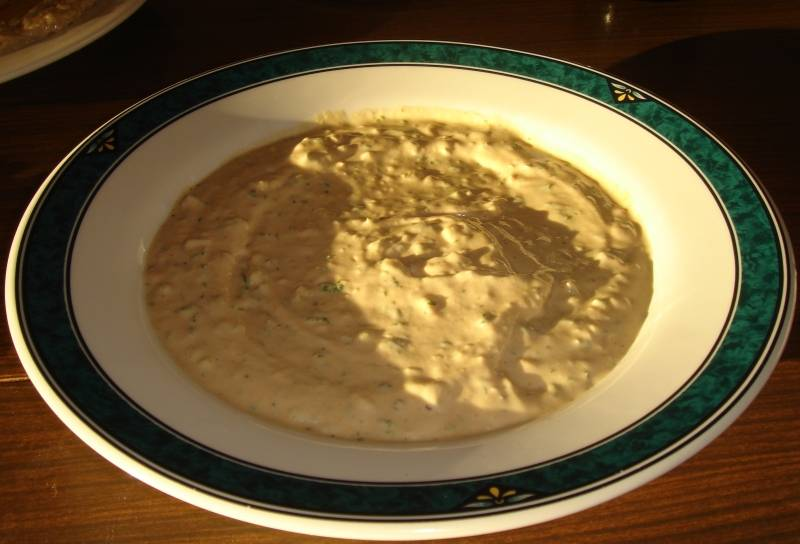
Tahini

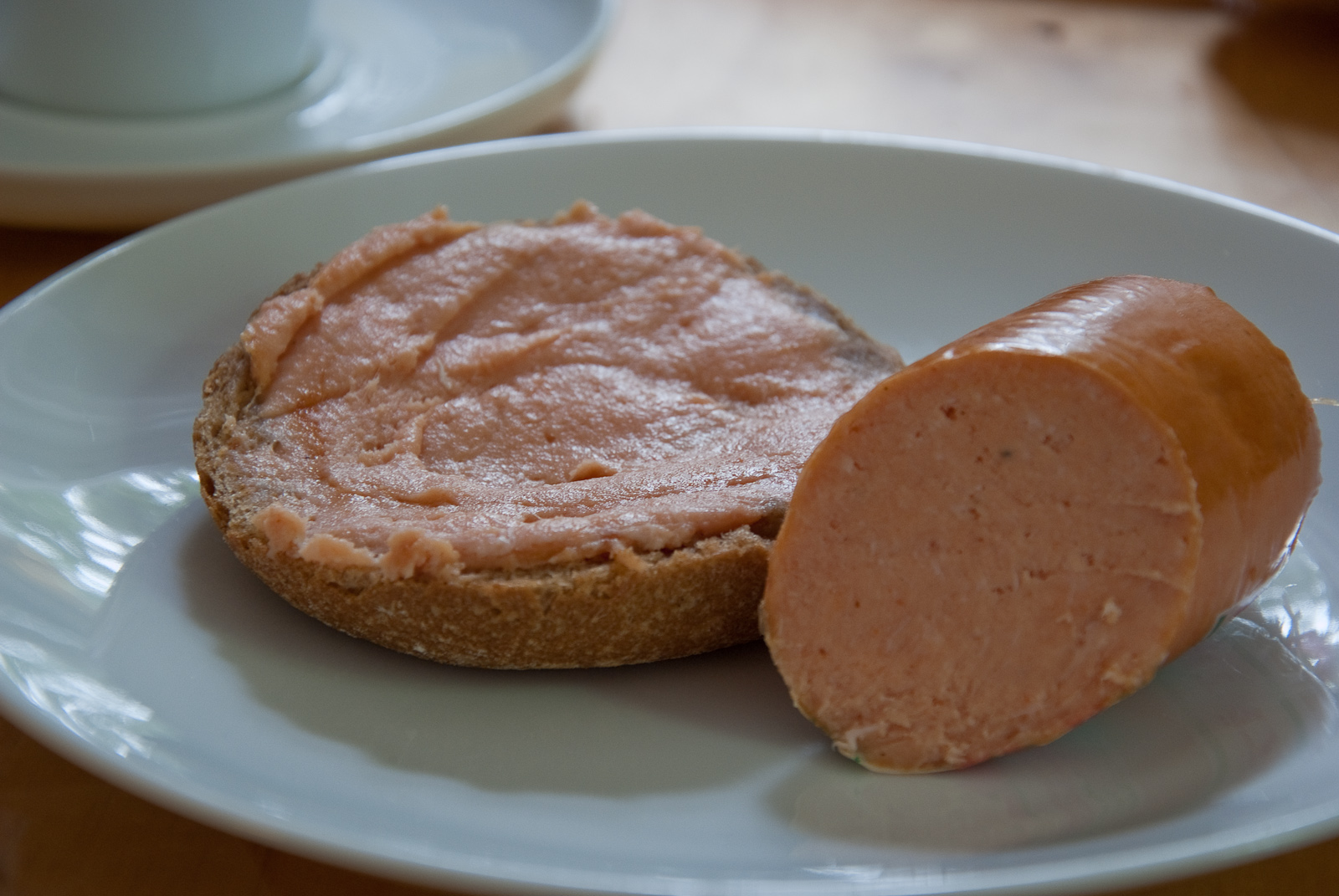
Teewurst

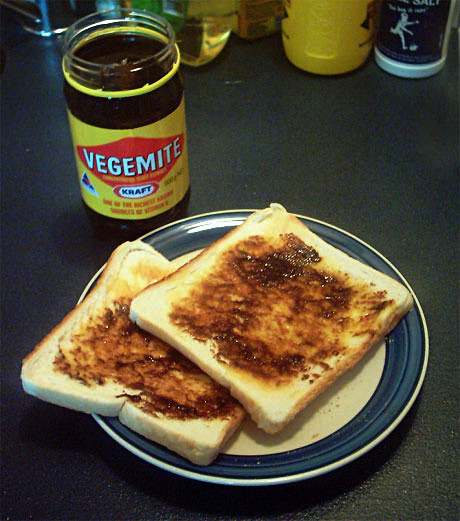
Vegemite on toast

- Aioli – sauce made of garlic, salt, and olive oil of the northwest Mediterranean
- Ajvar – Southeast European condiment made from red bell peppers, eggplants, garlic, and oil
- Amlu – Moroccan spread of argan oil, almonds, and honey
- Bacon jam
- Bean dip – sometimes used as a spread
- Beer jam
- Biber salçası – Anatolian paste made from red chili peppers or sweet long peppers and salt
- Biscoff – sweet paste made from Biscoff biscuits
- Bovril - salty meat extract paste
- Butter

- Bretel butter
- Rucava white butter

- Carrot jam
- Chutney – sauce of the Indian subcontinent of tomato relish, a ground peanut garnish or a yogurt, cucumber, and mint dip
- Cheong – various sweetened Korean foods in the form of syrups, marmalades, and fruit preserves
- Chocolate spread
  - Gianduja
  - Nocilla — a spread similar to Nutella sold in Spain and Portugal
  - Nutella – a popular brand of sweetened hazelnut cocoa spread
  - Nutkao
- Citadel spread – paste made of peanut butter, oil, sugar, and milk powder
- Clotted cream
- Coconut jam - a general term for coconut-based jams in Southeast Asia. Coconut jams include kaya of Indonesia, Malaysia, and Singapore; sangkhaya of Thailand; and matamis sa bao, latik, or kalamay of the Philippines.
- Cookie butter
- Cretons – pork spread containing onions and spices, from Quebec
- Dulce de leche – confection from Latin America prepared by slowly heating sweetened milk
- Egg butter
- Electuary (Larwerge) – a honey-thickened juice spread popular in Switzerland, often made with forest fruit such as juniper or pine
- Féroce – made of avocados, cassava, olive oil, lime juice, salt cod, garlic, chili peppers, hot sauce, and seasonings, from Martinique
- Filet américain – Belgian variation of steak tartare
- Flora
- Foie gras
- Guacamole
- Heinz Sandwich Spread
- Honey
- Hummus – a spread of Middle Eastern origin made from cooked, mashed chickpeas blended with tahini, lemon juice, and garlic; standard garnish in the Middle East includes olive oil, a few whole chickpeas, parsley, and paprika
- Smörgåskaviar – a fish roe spread eaten in Scandinavia and Finland
- Kartoffelkäse
- Kaya (jam) – coconut jam, commonly eaten as kaya toast
- Kyopolou – Bulgarian and Turkish spread made from roasted eggplants and garlic
- Lard
- Latik – also known as "coconut caramel", a traditional Filipino sweet syrup made from coconut milk and sugar
- Liver spread – also known as "lechon sauce", a Filipino spread made from pureed cooked pork or chicken liver with spices, vinegar, and brown sugar
- Ljutenica – vegetable relish or chutney in Bulgaria, Macedonia, and Serbia
- Manjar blanco – term used in Spanish-speaking world to a variety of milk-based delicacies
- Manteca colorá – Andalusian spread prepared by adding spices and paprika to lard, cooked with minced or finely chopped pieces of pork
- Maple butter
- Margarine
- Marmite – British spread made from yeast extract
- Marshmallow creme
- Mett – minced raw pork seasoned with salt and black pepper, popular in Germany and Poland
- Mint jelly
- Moambe – also referred to as palm butter or palm cream
- Mayonnaise
- Miracle Whip
- 'Nduja – a spicy, spreadable pork sausage or salumi from Calabria, Italy
- Nut butter
  - Almond butter
  - Cashew butter
  - Hazelnut butter
  - Peanut butter
- Obatzda – a Bavarian cheese spread, prepared by mixing two thirds aged soft cheese, usually Camembert and one third butter
- Palm butter – a spread made of palm oil designed to imitate dairy butter
- Paprykarz szczeciński – Polish spread made from ground fish, rice, tomato paste, vegetable oil, onion, salt and spices
- Pâté
  - Chopped liver
  - Liver pâté
  - Pheasant paste
- Pesto – a paste that traditionally consists of crushed garlic, European pine nuts, coarse salt, basil leaves, and hard cheese such as Parmigiano-Reggiano or Pecorino Sardo, all blended with olive oil
- Peabutter
- Pimento cheese
- Pindjur – Bulgarian, Serbian, Bosnian and Macedonian spread which ingredients include red bell peppers, tomatoes, garlic, vegetable oil and salt
- Plum butter
  - Powidl - a type of fruit spread prepared from the prune plum, that is popular in Central Europe.
  - Magiun of Topoloveni - a Romanian traditional plum butter that does not contain sweeteners or other additives, which has received a Protected Geographical Status from the European Union in 2011.
- Remoulade – European cold sauce based on mayonnaise
- Rillettes – French paste made with pork or other meats and sometimes with anchovies, tuna, or salmon
- Schmaltz – rendered (clarified) chicken or goose fat
- Sobrassada – typical from the Balearic Isles, made from pork, paprika, salt, and other spices
- Sunflower butter
- Tahini – paste made from ground, husked, hulled sesame seeds
- Tapenade – Provençal spread of puréed or finely chopped olives, capers, and anchovies
- Taramasalata – Greek meze made from salted and cured roe of the cod, carp, or grey mullet mixed with olive oil, lemon juice, and bread or potatoes
- Tartar sauce
- Teewurst – a German sausage made from two parts raw pork (and sometimes beef) and one part bacon, it contains 30 to 40 percent fat, which makes it particularly easy to spread
- Vegemite – a thick, dark brown Australian food spread made from leftover brewers' yeast extract with various vegetable and spice additives
- Zacuscă – vegetable spread popular in Romania and Moldova

Various spreads

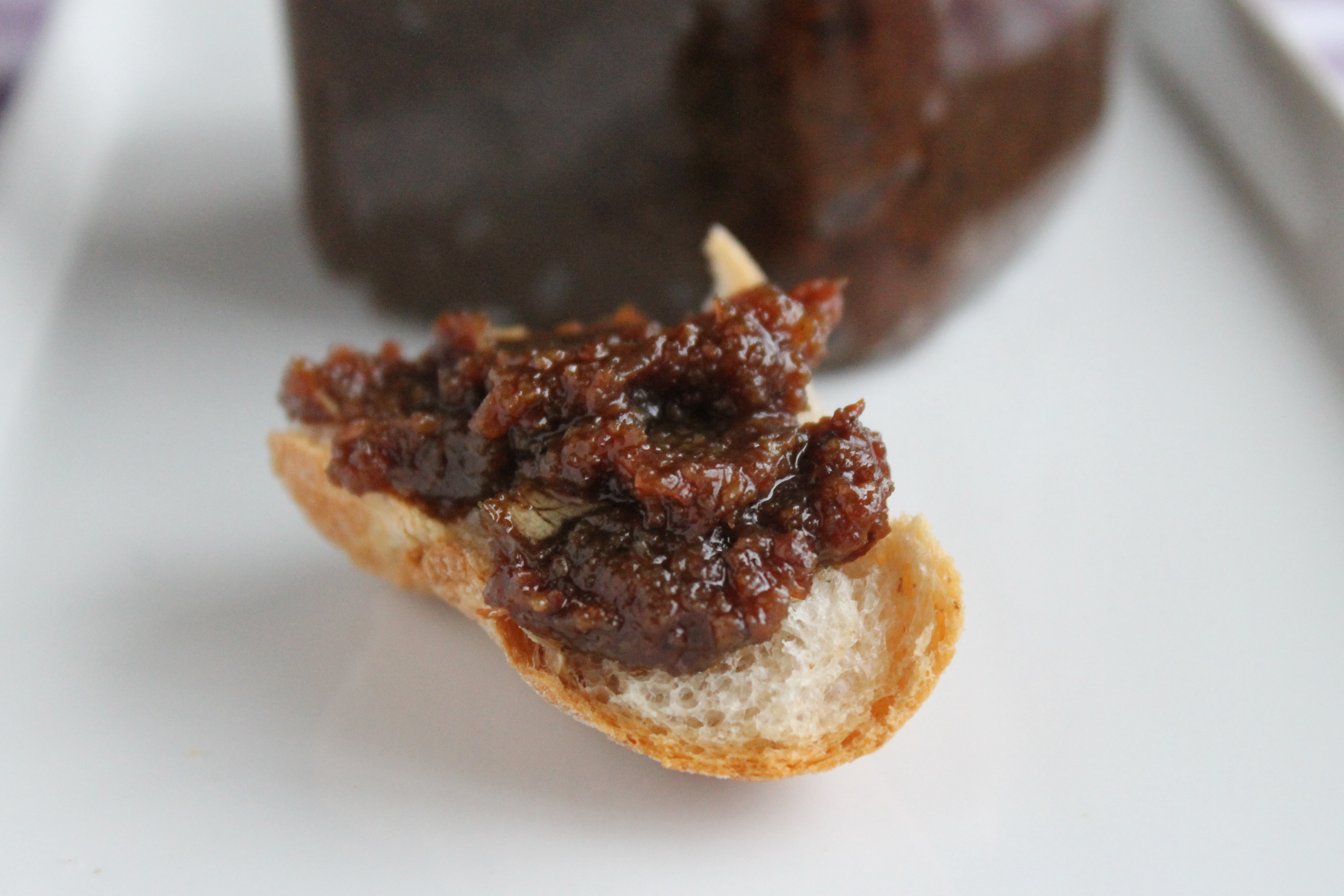
Bacon jam atop bread

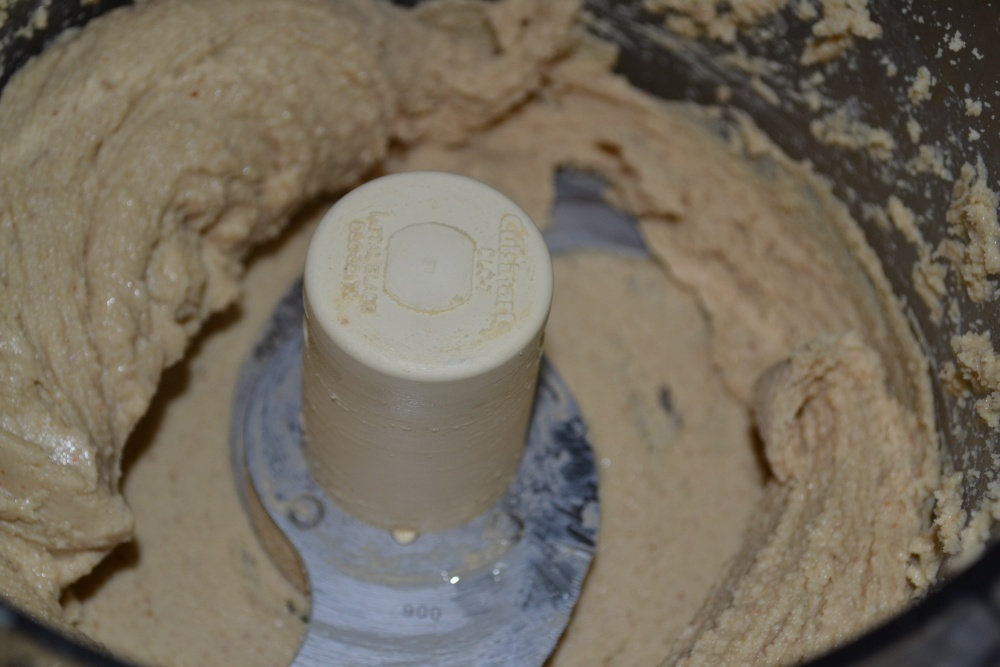
Cashew butter being ground

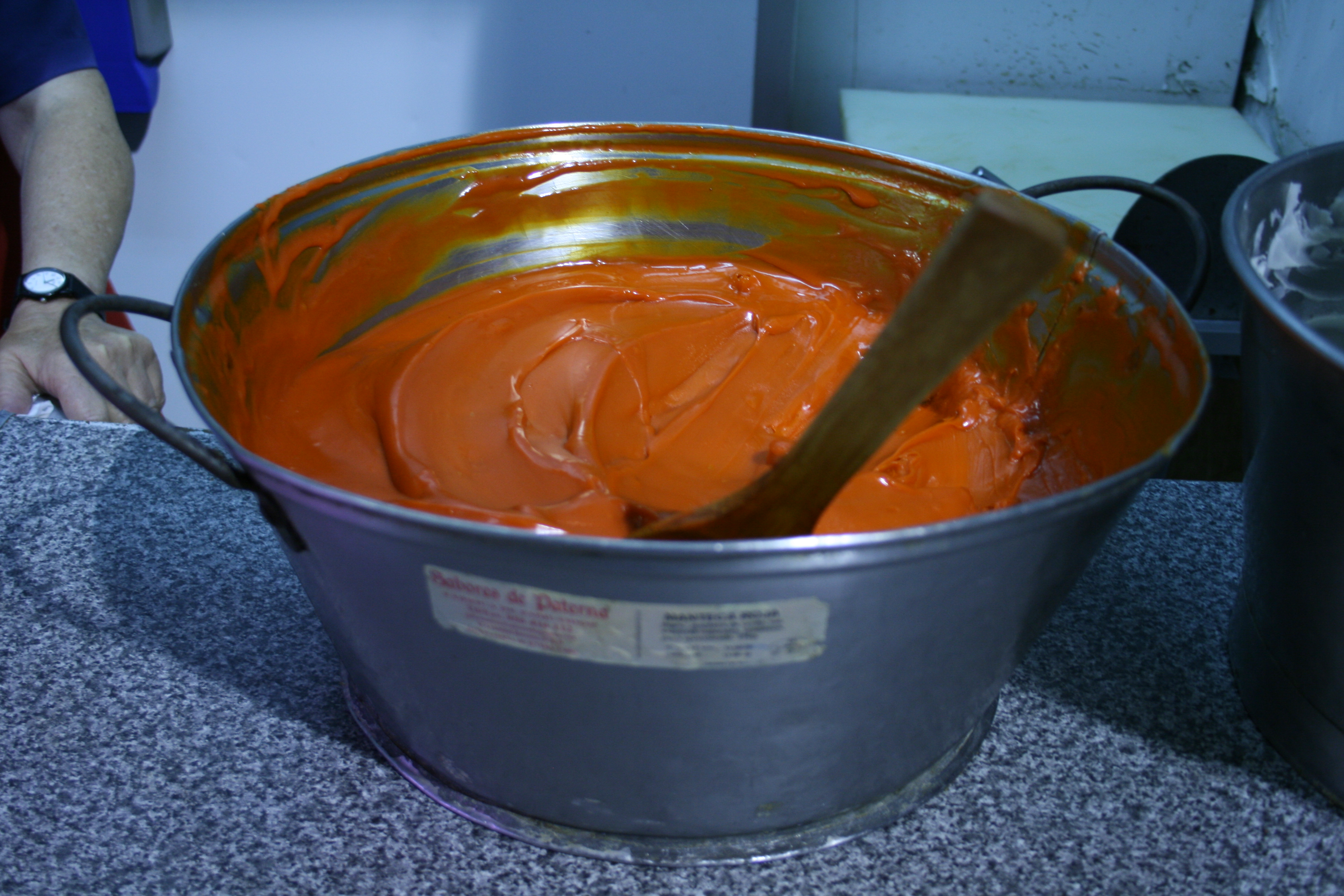
Manteca colorá

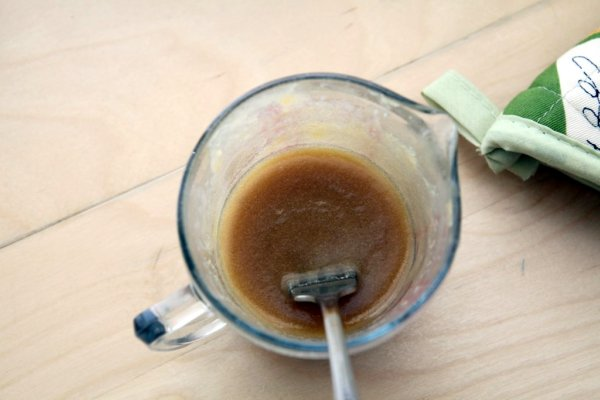
Maple butter

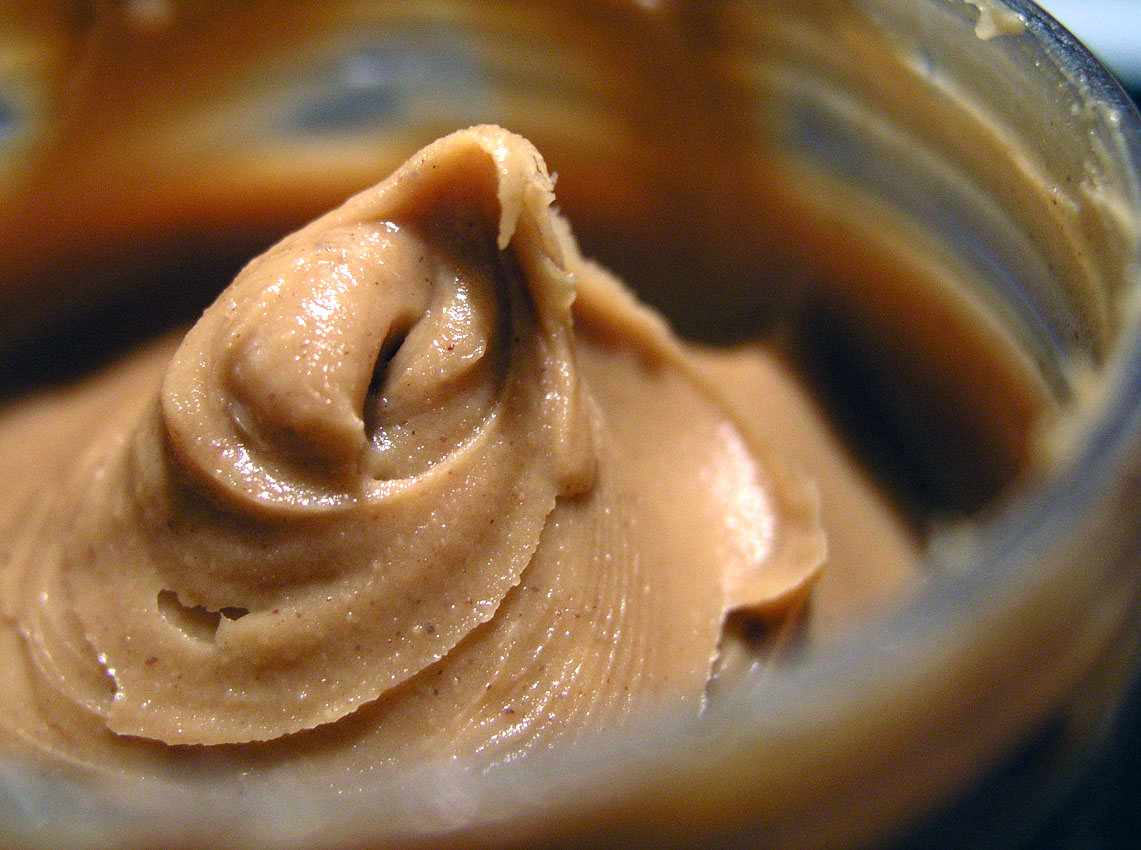
Peanut butter in a jar

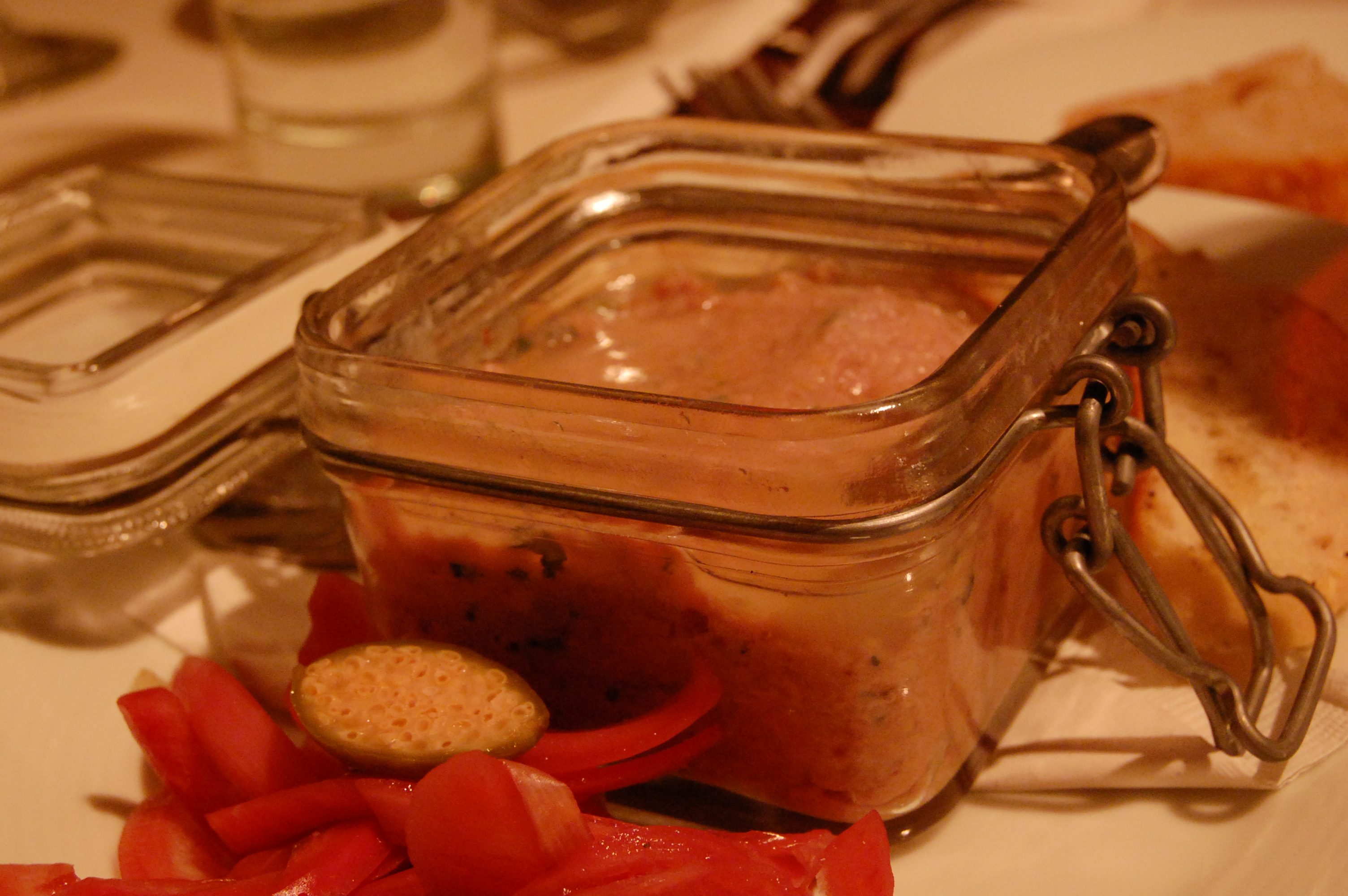
Rillettes

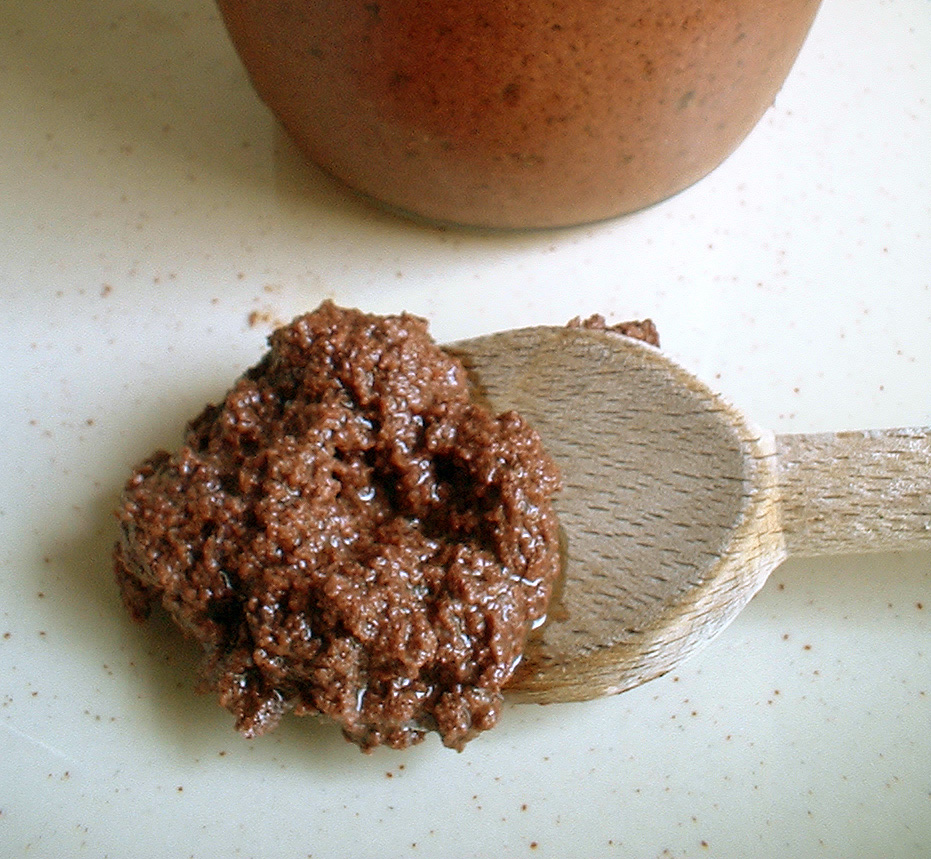
Tapenade

=== Cheeses and cheese spreads ===
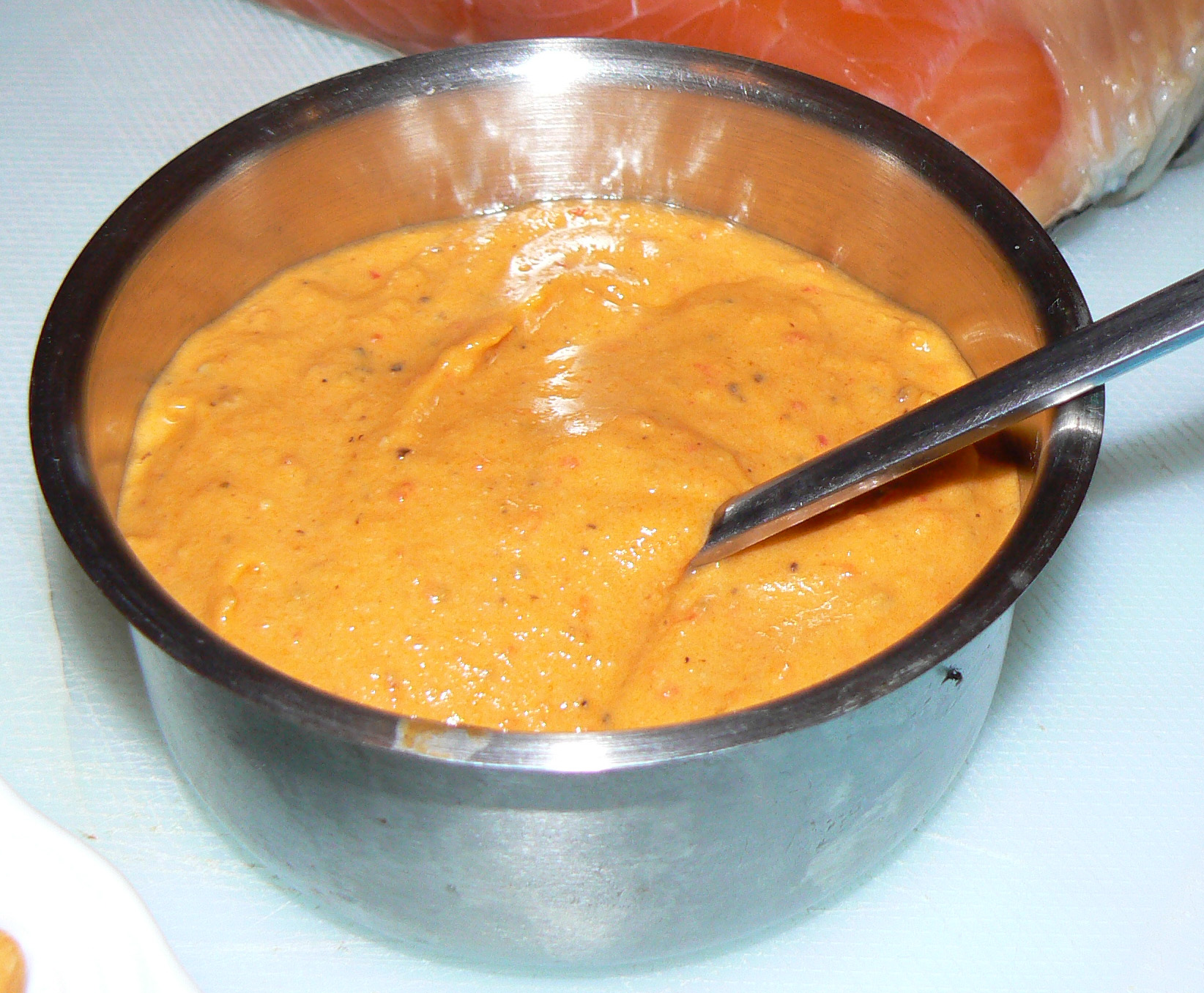
Almogrote

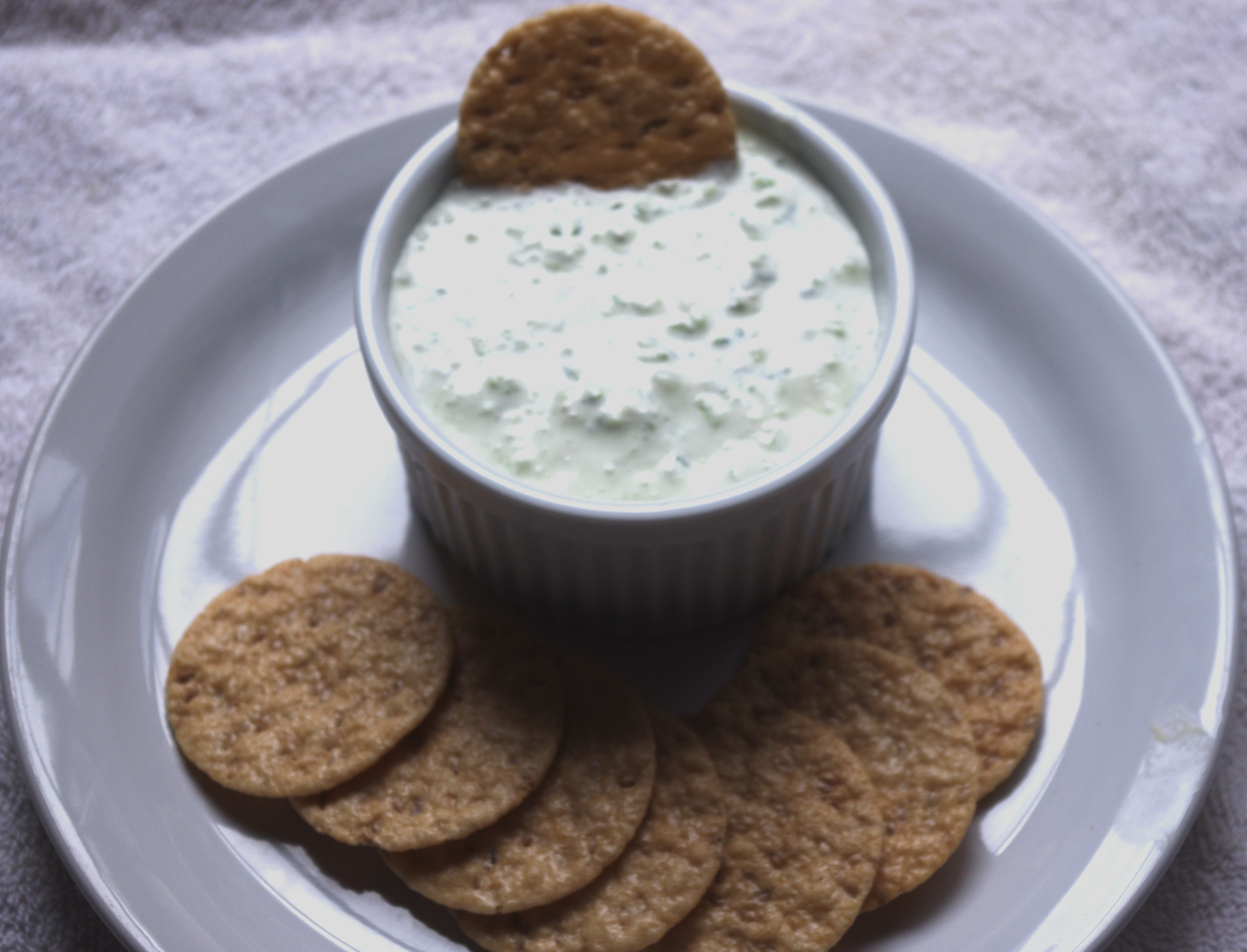
Benedictine used as a dip

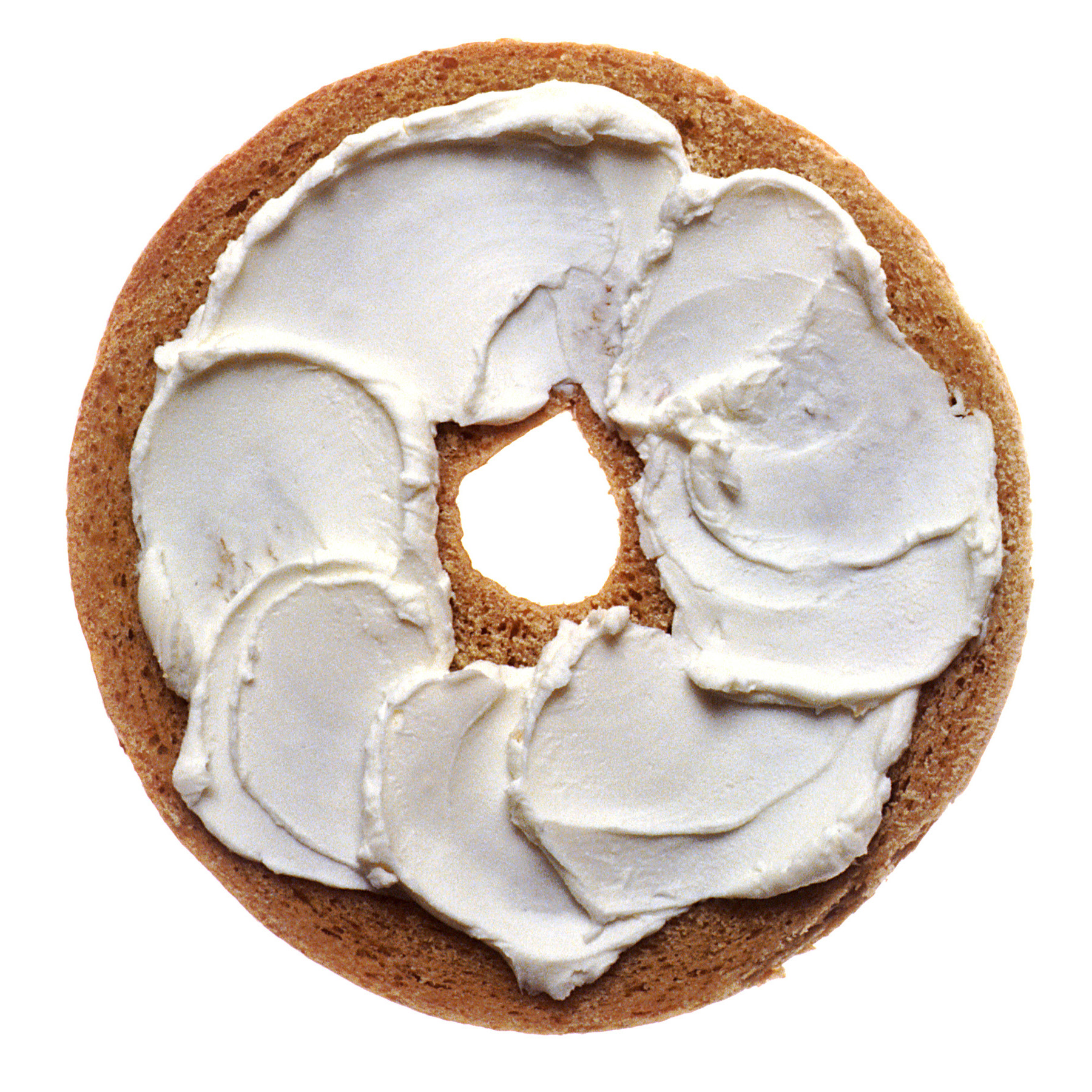
A bagel and cream cheese

Cheeses used as a spread and cheese spreads include:

- Almogrote
- Alouette cheese
- Beer cheese
- Benedictine
- Brie – sometimes used as a spread
- Catupiry
- Cheez Whiz
- Cervelle de canut
- Cold pack cheese
- Cottage cheese
- Cream cheese
- Creole cream cheese
- Cup cheese
- Dairylea
- Easy Cheese
- Eden
- Farmer cheese – sometimes used as a spread
- Fromage blanc
- Fromage fort
- Kraft Singles
- Laughing Cow
- Liptauer
- Magnolia
- Moretum
- Obatzda
- Pimento cheese
- Port wine cheese
- Prim
- Primula cheese spread
- Pub cheese
- Requeijão
- Rushan cheese
- Tirokafteri
- Urnebes
- Velveeta

=== Fruit spreads and preserves ===
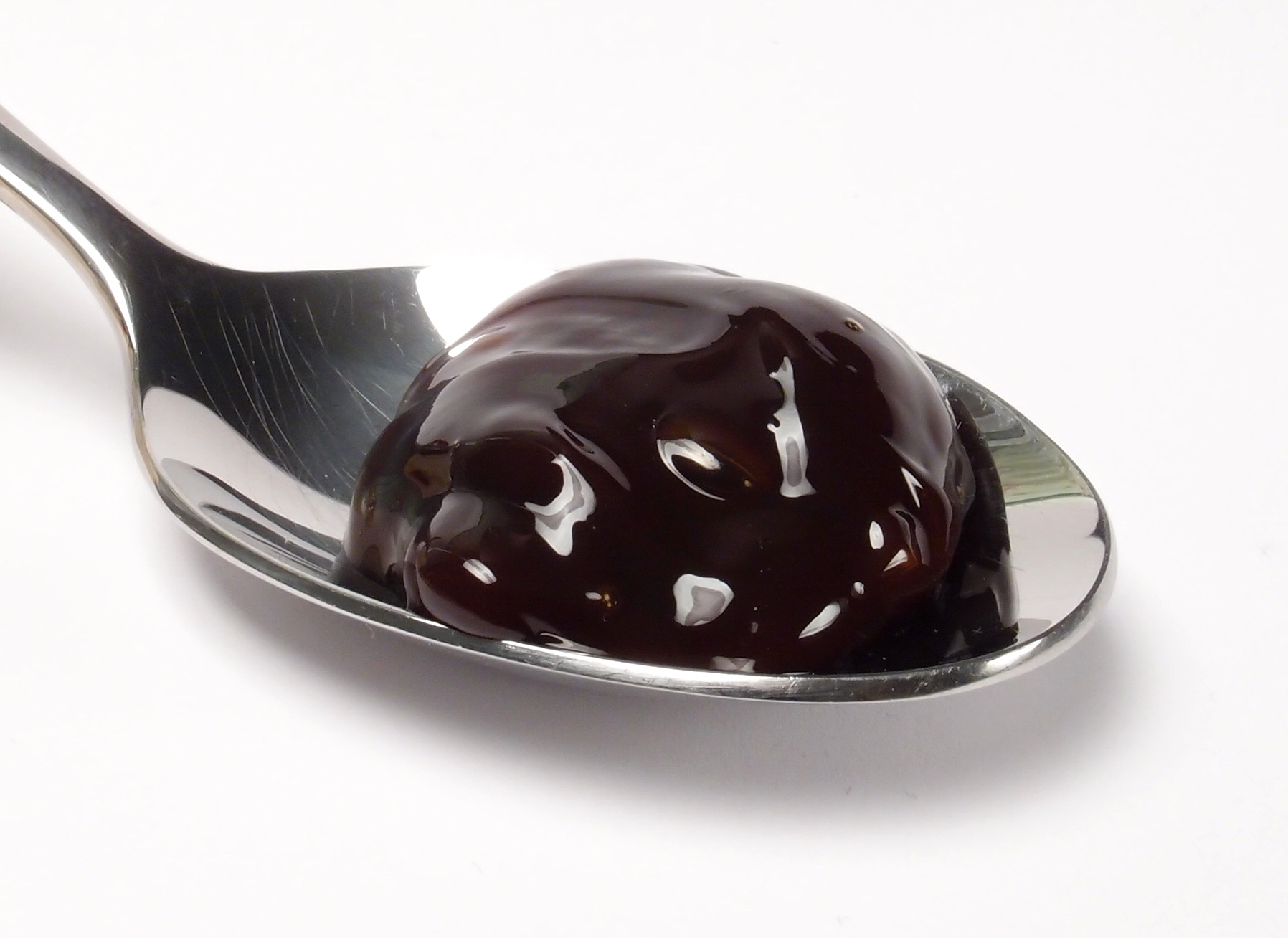
A spoonful of "rinse appelstroop" (sweet and sour apple butter), a Dutch syrup specialty made from apple and sugar beet juice.

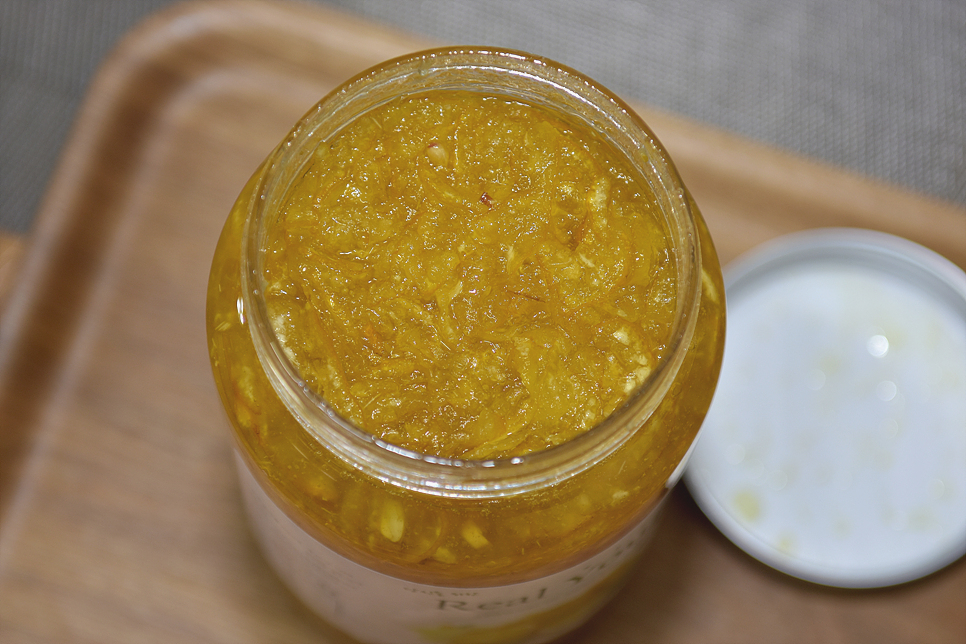
Yuja-cheong

Fruit spreads and preserves include:

- Apple butter – Caramelized, concentrated apple sauce
- Apricot Jam
- Bar-le-duc jelly
- Berry Jam
  - Berries
- Birnenhonig
- Cabell d'àngel
- Chutney
- Coconut jam
- Confit
- Confiture
- Confiture de lait
- Conserves
- Eggplant jam
- Fruit butter
- Fruit curd
- Guava jelly
- Hagebuttenmark – a fruit preserve made from rose hips, sugar and sometimes red wine
- Lekvar
- Lingonberry jam
- Marmalade
- Nièr beurre
- Pepper jelly
- Powidl – a plum butter prepared without additional sweeteners or gelling agents
- Quince cheese
- Sirop de Liège – prepared using evaporated fruit juices
- Tomato jam
- Ube halaya – also known as ube jam
- Yuja-cheong
Fruit spreads and preserves

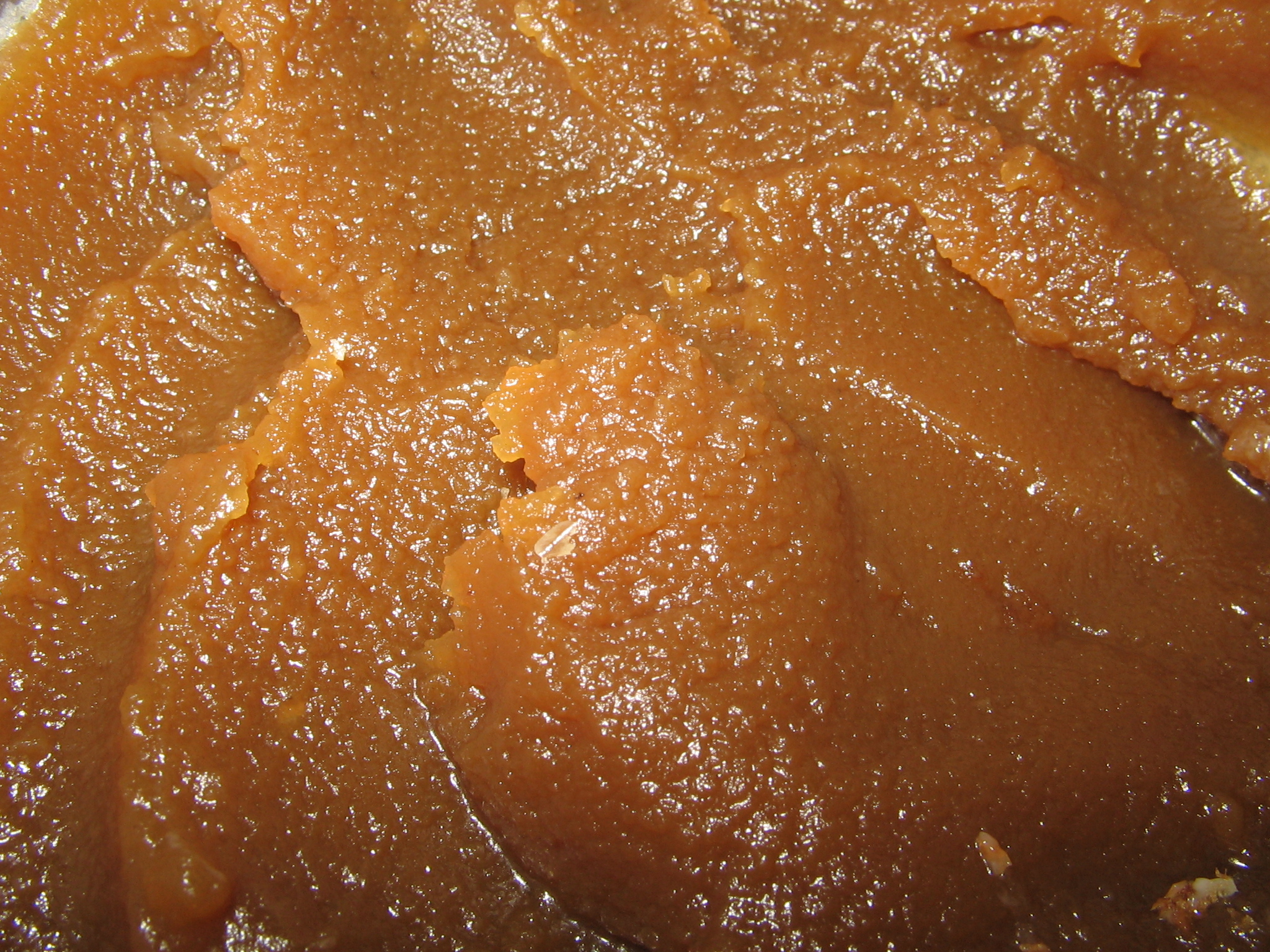
Close-up view of a coconut jam

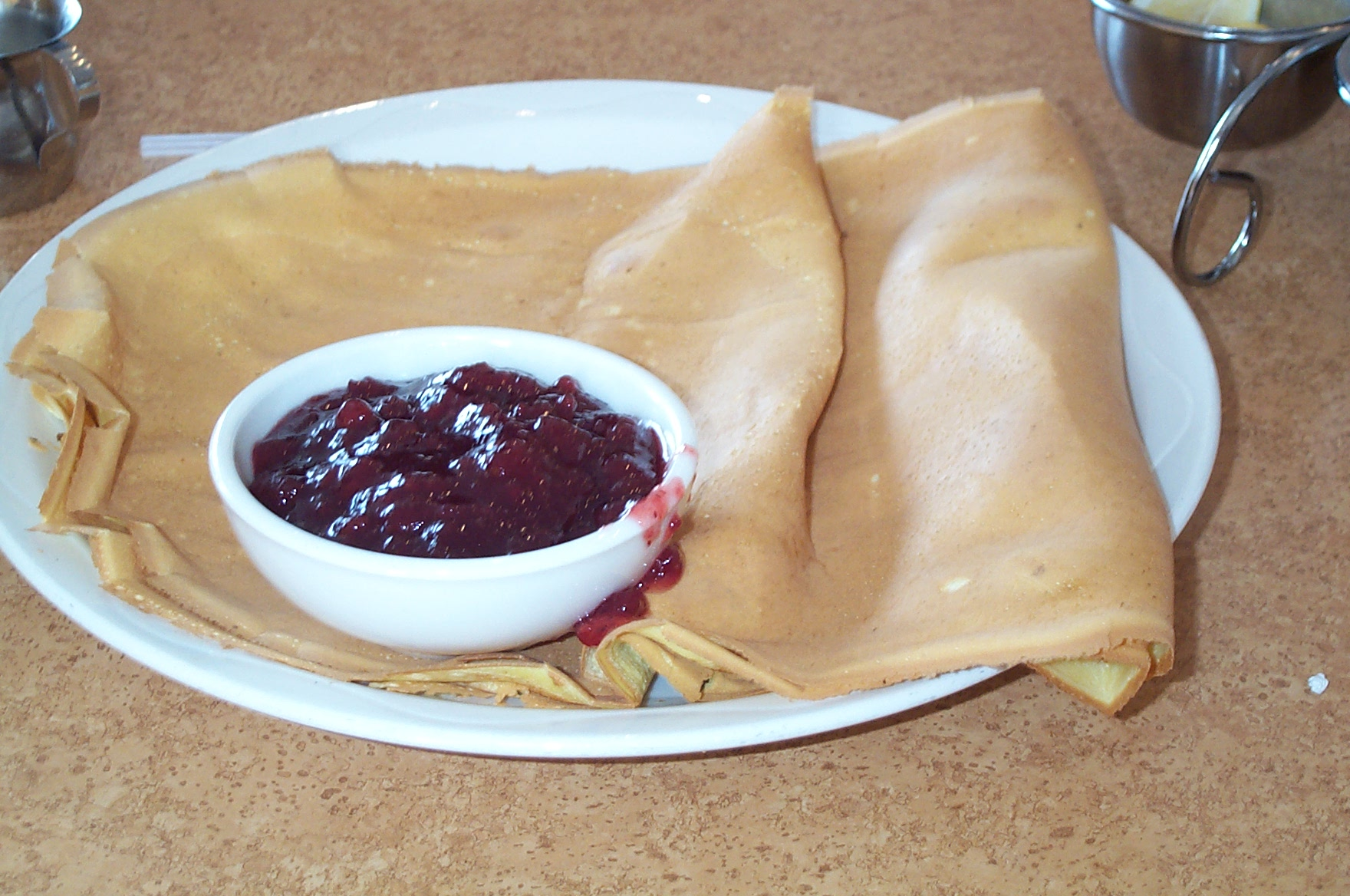
Pancakes with lingonberry jam

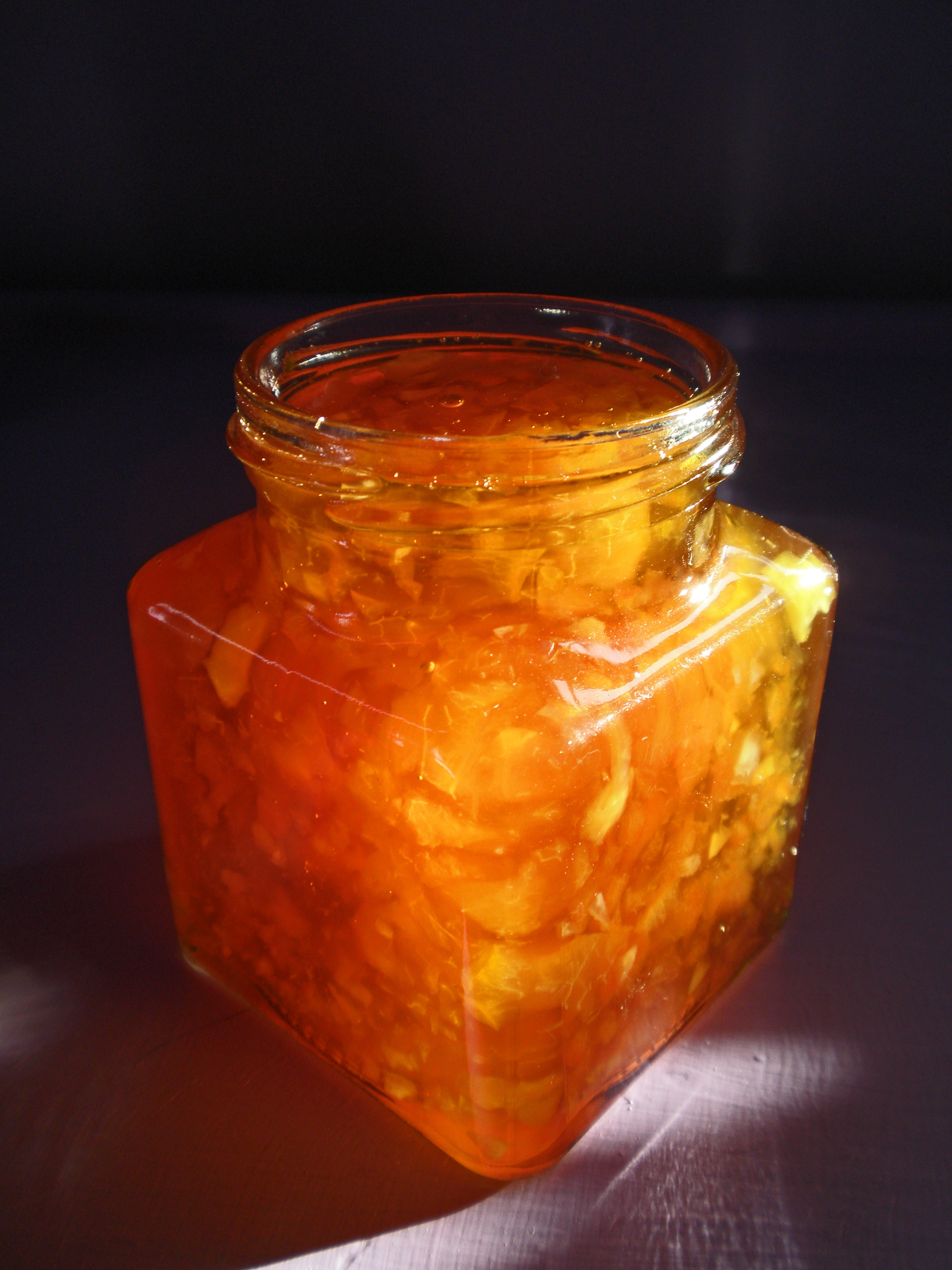
Homemade English marmalade

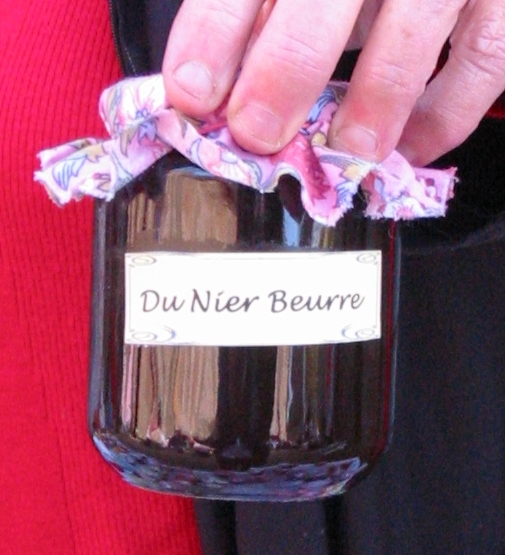
A jar of nièr beurre

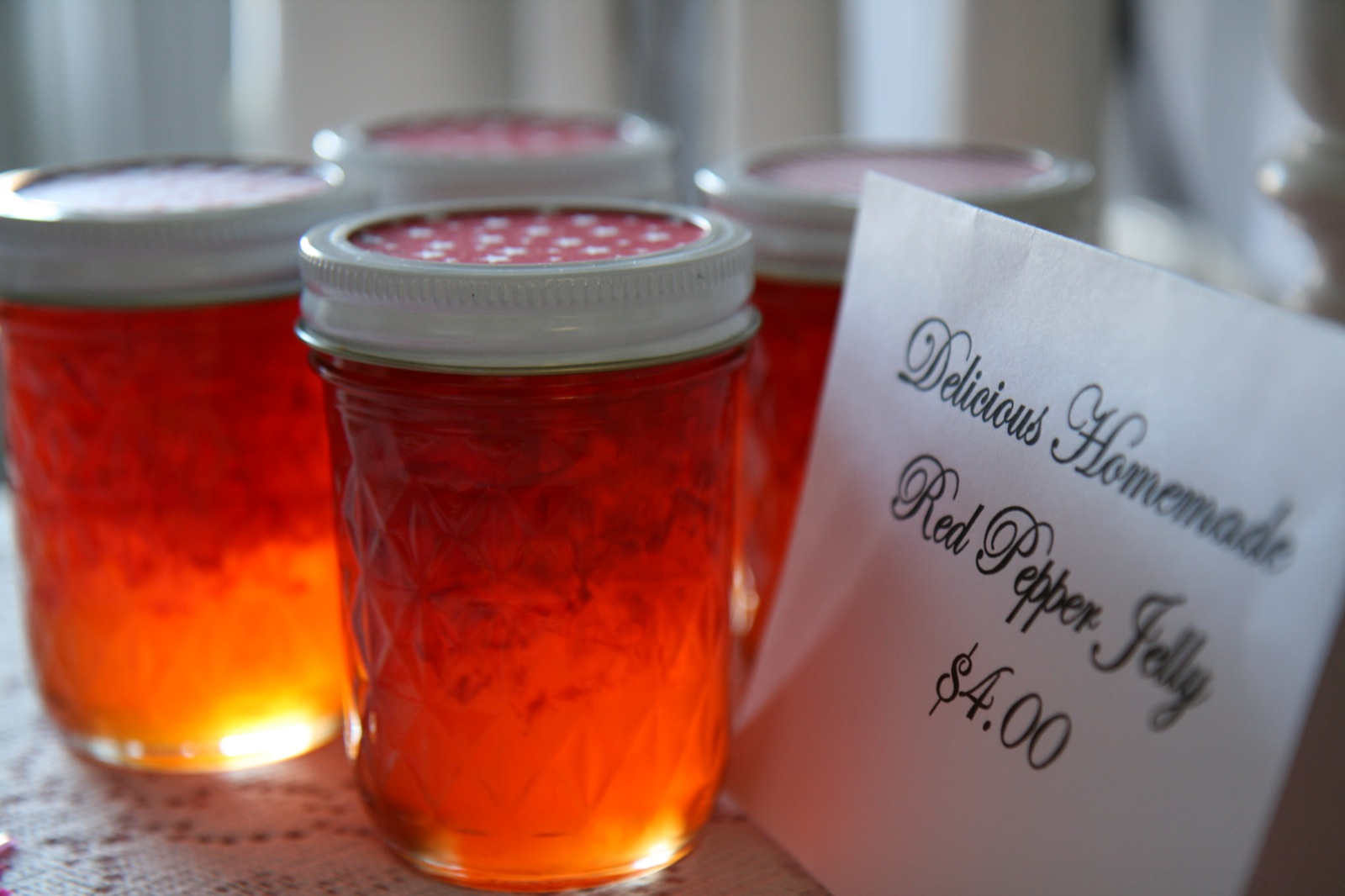
Red pepper jelly

Powidl plum butter

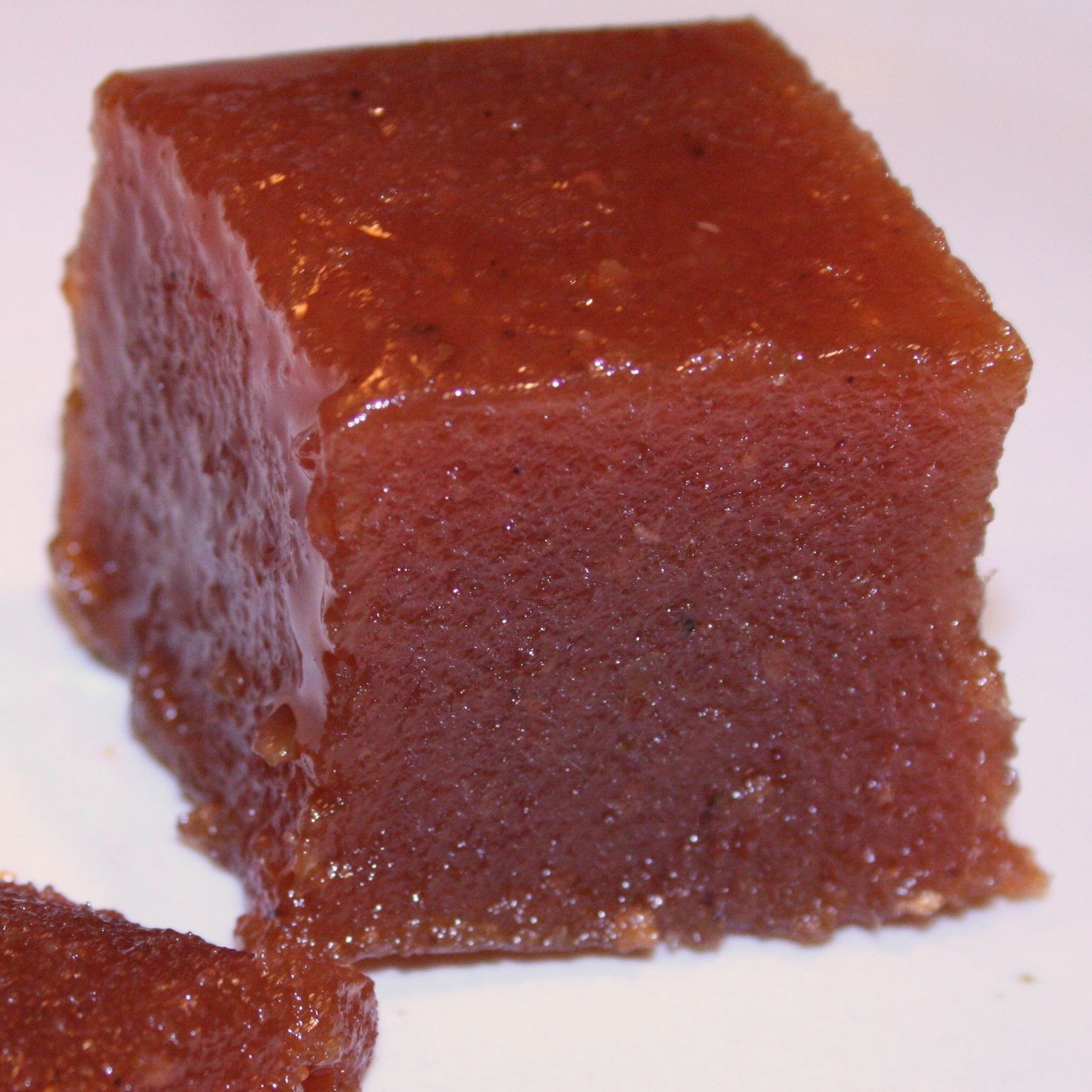
Quince cheese

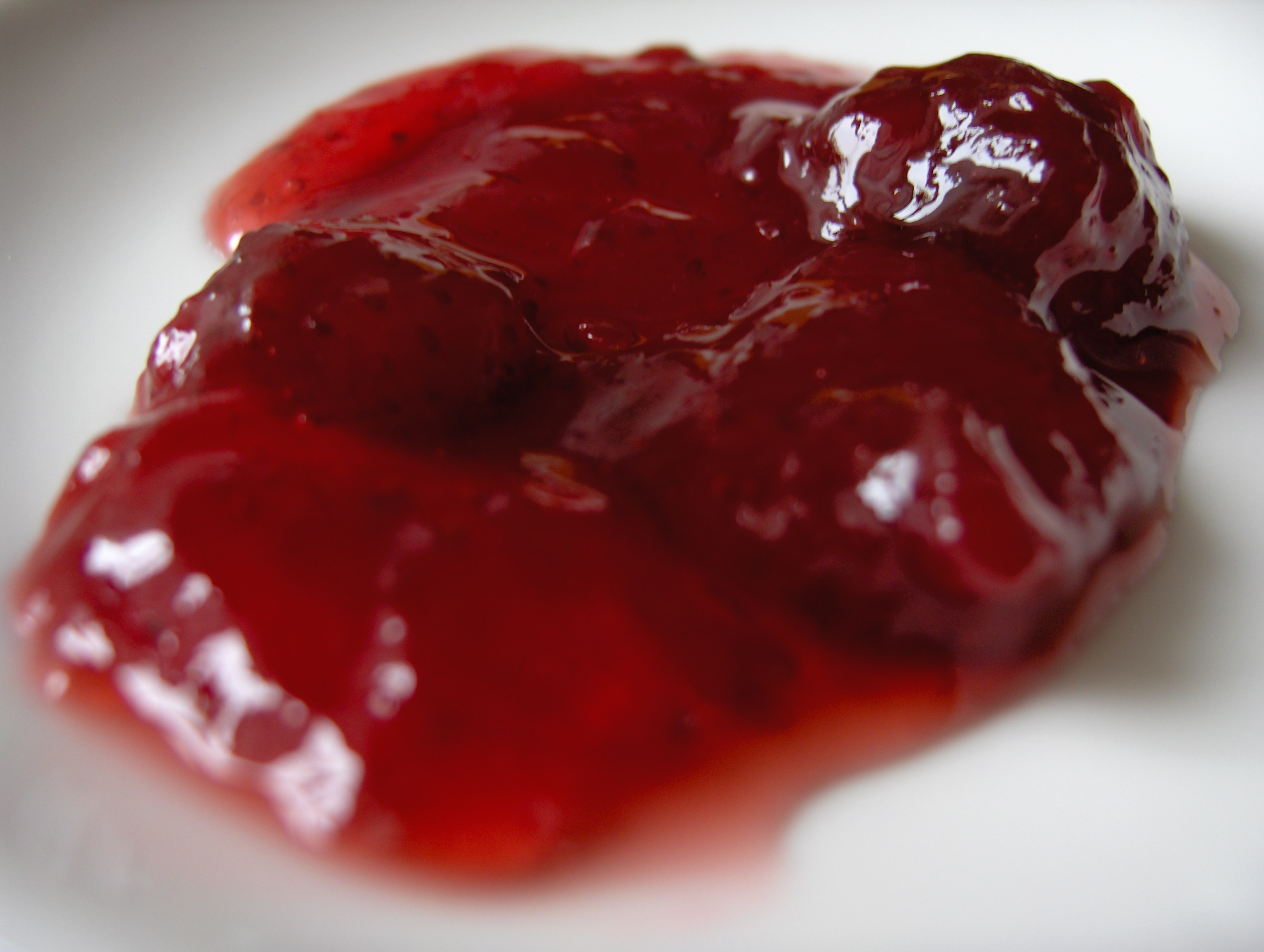
Strawberry jam

=== Yeast extract spreads ===
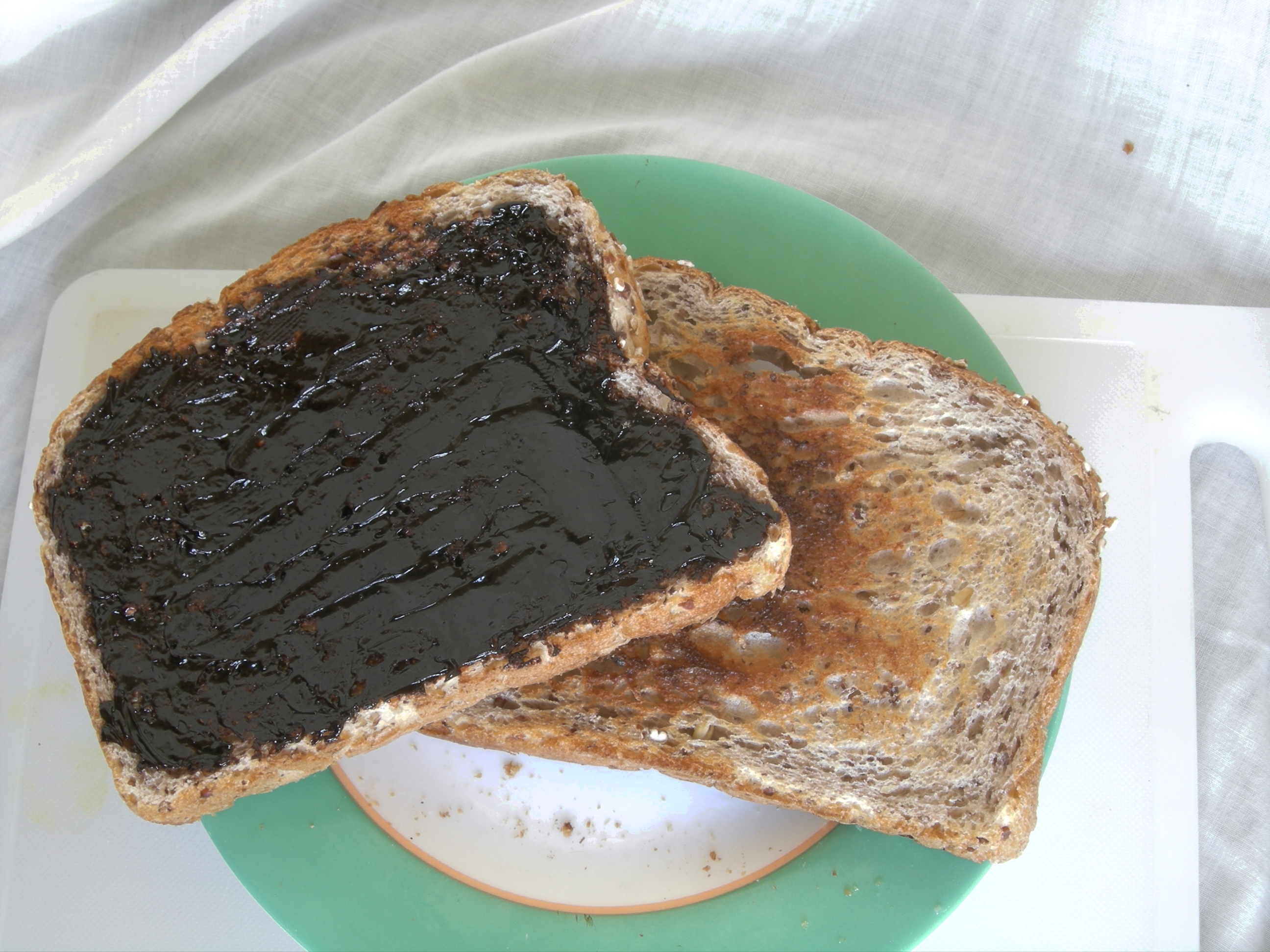
Marmite spread on toasted bread

Yeast extract spreads include:

- AussieMite
- Cenovis
- Guinness Yeast Extract
- Marmite
- Marmite (New Zealand)
- Oxo
- Promite
- Vegemite
- Vitam-R

== See also ==
- Fondue
- List of butter dishes
- List of condiments
- List of dips
- List of food pastes
- List of syrups
- Spoon sweets – sweet preserves, served in a spoon as a gesture of hospitality in Greece, the Balkans, parts of the Middle East, and Russia
- Yogurt
