= Cup cheese =

Soft cheese spread product

- Type: Cheese
- Place of origin: United States
- Region or state: Pennsylvania Dutch
- Created by: Mennonites and Amish
- Invented: Late 17th century

Cup cheese is a soft, spreadable cheese rooted in Pennsylvania Dutch culinary history. Its heritage dates back to the immigration of the Mennonites and Amish to Pennsylvania in the late 17th century. A variation of the German cheese "Kochkäse", it is a specialty food labeled as cup cheese because it is sold in a cup.

Cup Cheese is described in James A. Michener's novel Centennial in 1974:

'You ever tasted my mother's cup cheese? Best in Lancaster.'

Taking a corner of his black bread, he spread it copiously with a yellowish viscous substance that one would not normally identify as cheese; it was more like a very thick, very cold molasses, and it had a horrific smell. Rebecca was not fond of cup cheese; it was a taste that men seemed to prefer.

'Poppa likes cup cheese,' she said with a neutral look on her pretty face.

'You don't? Levi asked.

'Too smelly.'

'That's the good part.' He put the piece of bread to his nose, inhaling deeply. He knew of few things in the world he liked better than the smell of his mother's cup cheese. By some old accident the German farmers of Lancaster County had devised a simple way of making a cheese that smelled stronger than limburger and tasted better. He ate her piece, his own, what was left and then licked the container."

== See also ==
- List of spreads
