= Heinz Sandwich Spread =

Sandwich spread

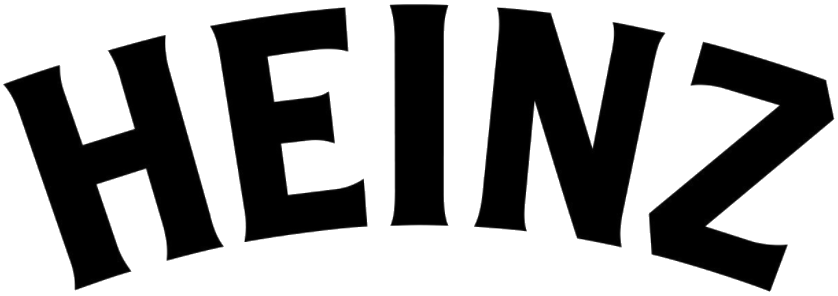

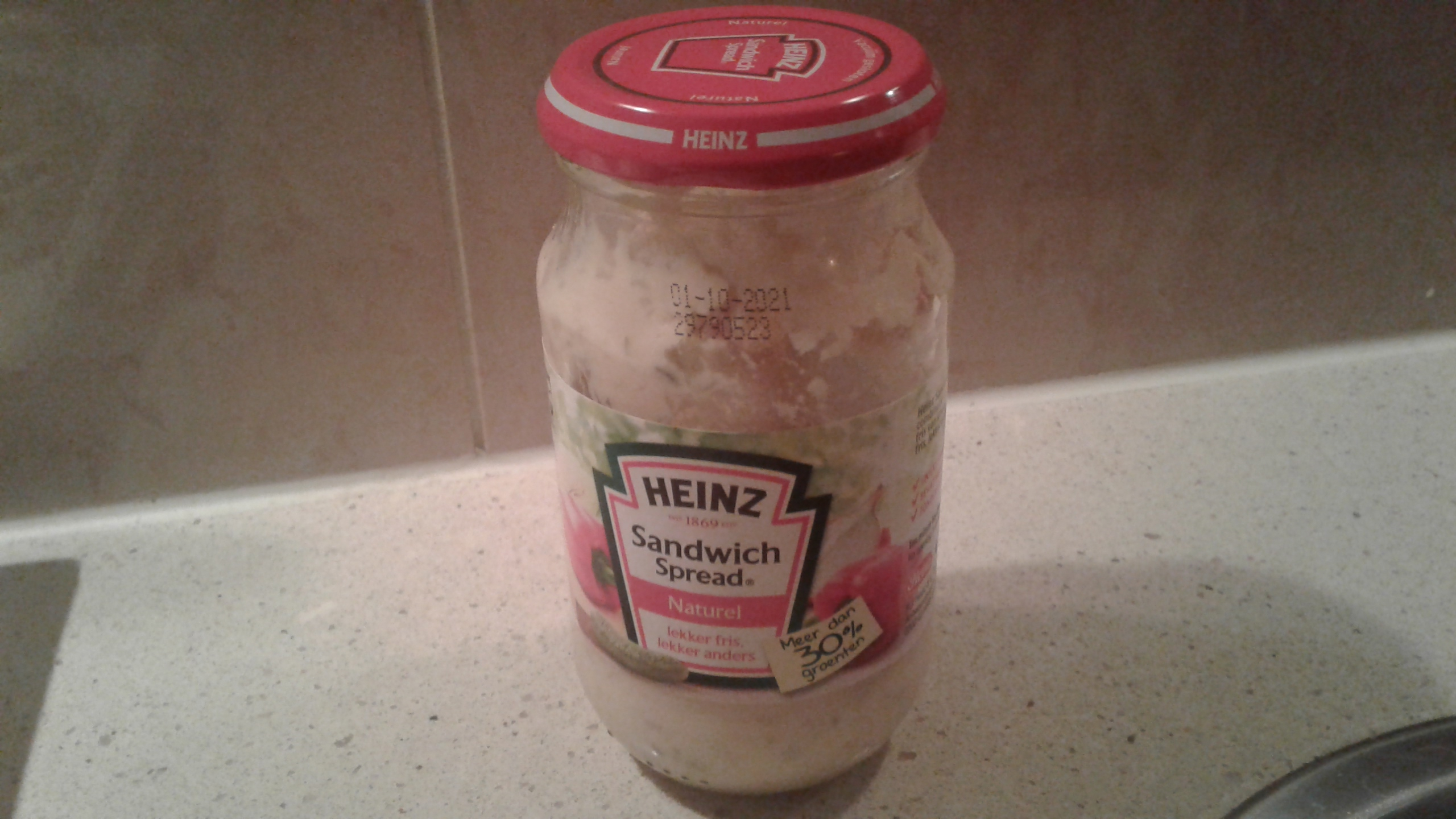
- Product type: Salad cream
- Current owner: Kraft Heinz
- Produced by: Heinz
- Markets: Europe
- Website: heinz.co.uk/spread

Heinz Sandwich Spread is a blend of salad cream and relish manufactured by Heinz and popular in the Netherlands and Britain. It is classified by the manufacturer as a sauce or relish. The relish ingredients are spirit vinegar, sugar, cabbage (contains preservative: sulphites), rapeseed oil, water, carrots, gherkins (contain firming agent: calcium chloride), modified cornflour, salt, onions, egg yolks, red peppers, mustard, stabilisers: guar gum and xanthan gum, spice extracts, spices, herb extract (contains celery), flavourings and colour: riboflavin; vegetables 35%. The salad cream base results in a more tart flavour than similar mayonnaise-based sandwich spreads found in the United States.

== Variations ==
Heinz Sandwich Spread is considered a niche product and its main markets are within the UK and in parts of Canada. It has also become popular in Australia, Belgium and The Netherlands. The Dutch spread is sweeter and creamier with the red colour coming from red pepper. The Original recipe version includes carrots and a different blend of spices. Similar supermarket own brand products have included Seafood Sandwich Spread using a Thousand Island Dressing base.

== Uses ==
In Britain, Sandwich Spread is a convenience lunchbox sandwich filling for both schoolchildren and adults. Among adults, it may also fall into the category of comfort food through its association with childhood.

Sandwich Spread may be used alone as a sandwich filling or as a relish in cheese, tuna or sliced meat sandwiches. It is also used with salads, burgers, hot dogs, baked potatoes and omelettes. Its longer shelf life means it is sometimes substituted for coleslaw.

== See also ==
- List of spreads
