= Nut butter =

Spreadable paste of nuts

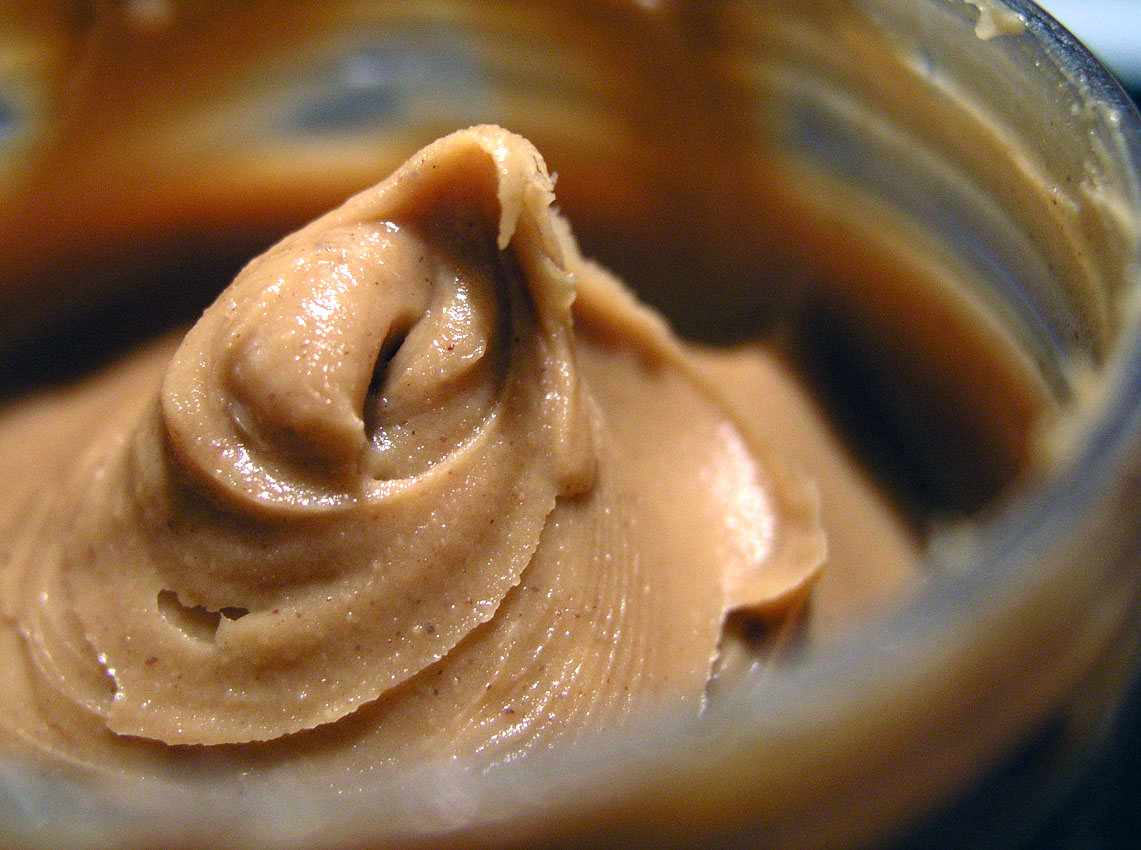
- Peanut butter, made from roasted peanuts
- Type: Spread
- Main ingredients: Nuts or seeds

A nut butter is a spreadable foodstuff made by grinding nuts or seeds into a paste. The result has a high fat content and can be spread like dairy butter. True nut butters include:

- Acorn
- Hazelnut (see Hazelnut butter and Chocolate hazelnut spread)

Other tree nut butters (from drupes):

- Almond (see Almond butter and Almond paste)
- Cashew (see Cashew butter)
- Macadamia
- Pecan
- Pistachio
- Walnut

Similar spreads can also be made from seeds that are not considered nuts in a botanical sense:

- Pumpkin seed
- Sesame seed (called tahini)
- Sunflower seed (see Sunflower butter)

Legume butters and spreads include:

- Peanut (see Peanut butter)
- Soybean, specifically soy nut (roasted soybeans)
- Chickpea (combined with tahini into hummus)

The almond, cashew, macadamia, peanut, pecan, pistachio and walnut are not true nuts in a botanical sense. However, because they are considered nuts in a culinary sense, their crushed spreads are called nut butters. Nut and seed butters have a high content of protein, fiber, and essential fatty acids, and can be used to replace butter or margarine on bread or toast. Nut butters can also be used as dipping sauces for apples and bananas, toppings for oatmeal or smoothie bowls, and ingredients in Asian sauces.

The grinding of nuts into a paste has a long history. Almond paste or marzipan was highly prized by the caliphs of Baghdad. The Kitab al-Tabikh or Book of Recipes was a collection of recipes from the court of ninth-century Baghdad. The most esteemed sweet was lauziinaq, an almond paste much like marzipan. Hazelnut butter was mixed with chocolate to overcome shortages during the Napoleonic wars and WWII, which led to the invention of gianduja chocolate spreads (e.g. Nutella).

== Nutritional properties ==
The following table gives some approximate nutritional properties (for a reference serving of 1 tablespoon or approximately 15 grams) of some nut and seed butters. Many of these contain additional oils or other ingredients that may alter the nut butter's nutritional content.

| Butter | Food energy kJ (kcal) | Protein (g) | Fat (g) | Calcium (mg) | Zinc (mg) |
|---|---|---|---|---|---|
| Almond butter | 420 (101) | 2.4 | 9.5 | 43 | 0.5 |
| Cashew butter | 390 (93) | 2.8 | 8 | 7 | 0.8 |
| Hazelnut butter | 390 (94) | 2 | 9.5 | N/A | N/A |
| Peanut butter – natural | 390 (94) | 3.8 | 8 | 7 | 0.4 |
| Peanut butter – reduced fat | 400 (95) | 4 | 6 | N/A | 0.4 |
| Sunflower butter | 330 (80) | 3 | 7 | N/A | N/A |
| Soy butter (sweetened) | 360 (85) | 4 | 5.5 | 50 | N/A |
| Soy butter (unsweetened) | 330 (80) | 4 | 6.5 | 30 | N/A |
| Soy-peanut butter (added sweetener) | 210 (50) | 2 | 1.2 | 40 | N/A |
| Tahini | 370 (89) | 2.6 | 8 | 64 | 0.7 |

== See also ==
- List of spreads
- Shea butter
