= Beer jam =

Food

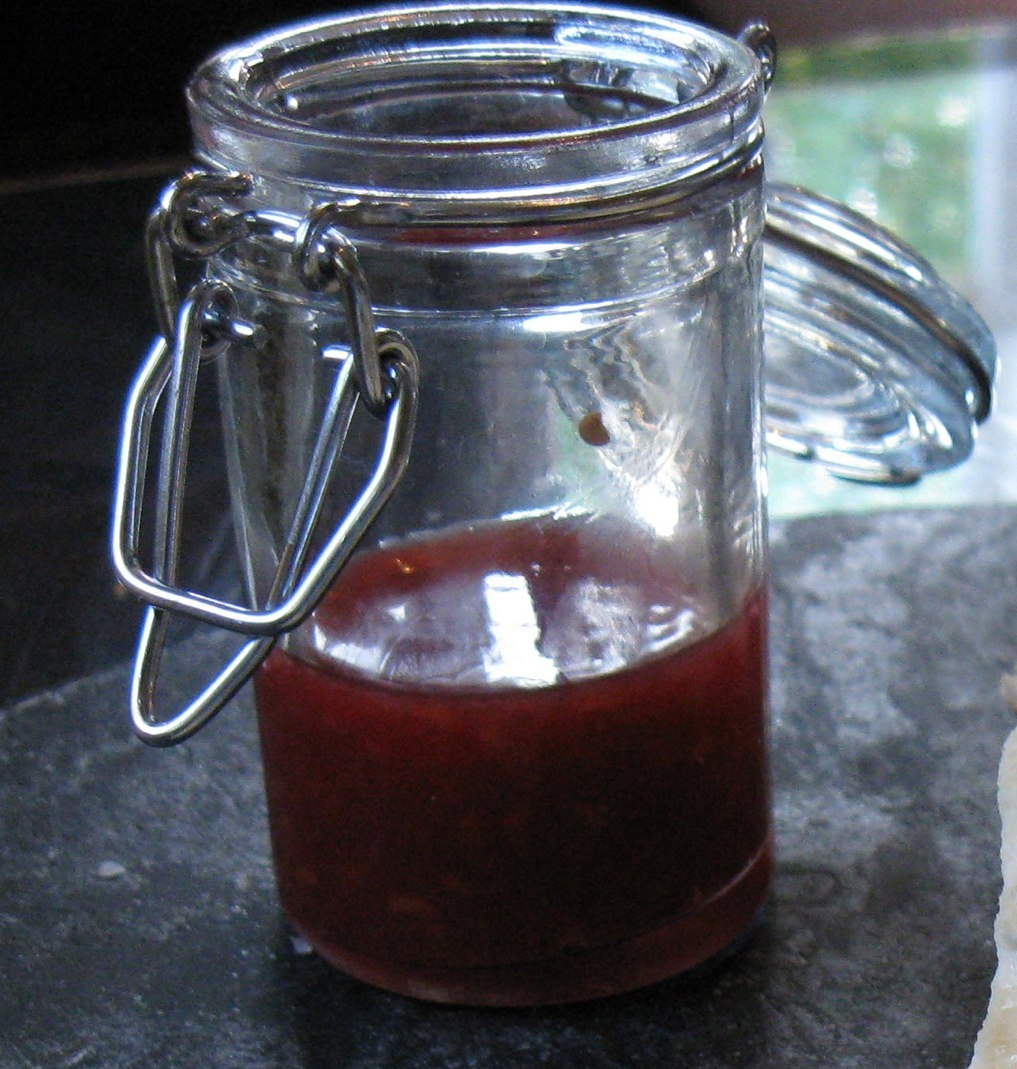
Raspberry-vanilla beer jam

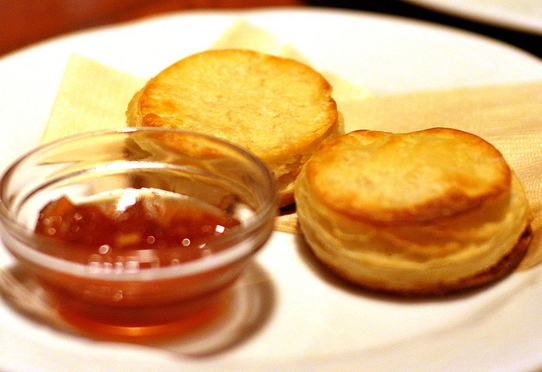
Cherry beer jam accompanying scones

Beer jam, also known as beer jelly, is a jam prepared with beer as a primary ingredient. It may be a sweet or savory jam, and some have a syrupy consistency. It may be used to glaze meats and vegetables or as a condiment. Some companies produce beer jam commercially.

== Overview ==
The primary ingredient of beer jam is beer. As a result of evaporation of the alcohol during the cooking process, beer jam may be non-alcoholic. Various types of beer, such as ale, dark beer and stout are used.

Some types are syrupy in consistency, rather than jam- or jelly-like, and syrupy versions are used in mixed drinks and cocktails, such as a beer jam Manhattan.

Simple versions may consist of only beer and pectin, but other types, both sweet and savory, are more complex. Sweet varieties can include sugar, allspice, cloves, orange zest, star anise, lemon and vanilla bean, while savory types may use tomato, shallots, grated Parmesan cheese, olive oil, rosemary, balsamic vinegar and sugar or brown sugar as ingredients.

== Uses ==
Beer jam may be used as a filling inside baked goods such as biscuits, as a glaze atop meat and vegetable dishes, and to accompany foods such as cheese, charcuterie and crackers, among others.

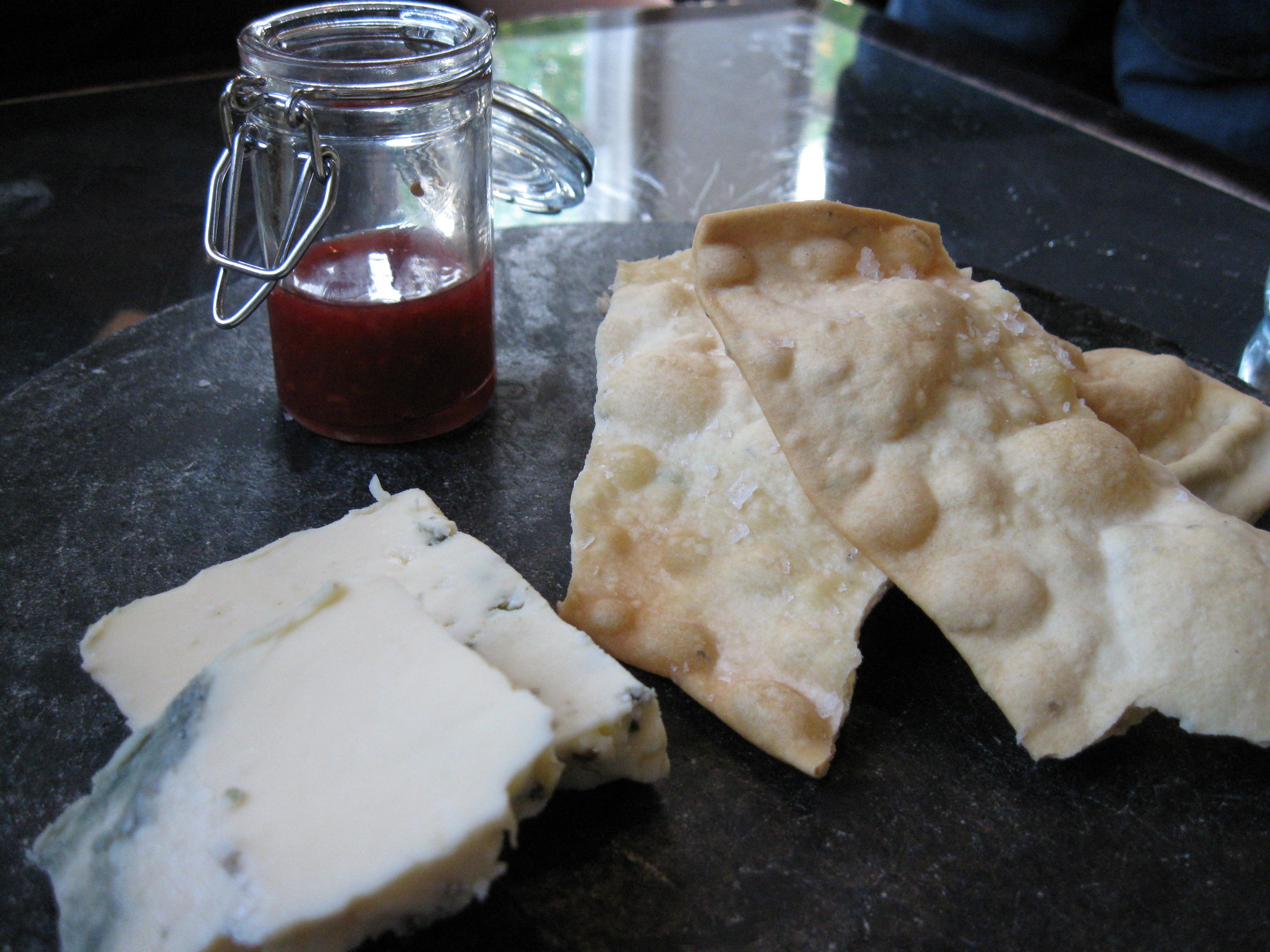
Raspberry-vanilla beer jam with flatbread and blue cheese

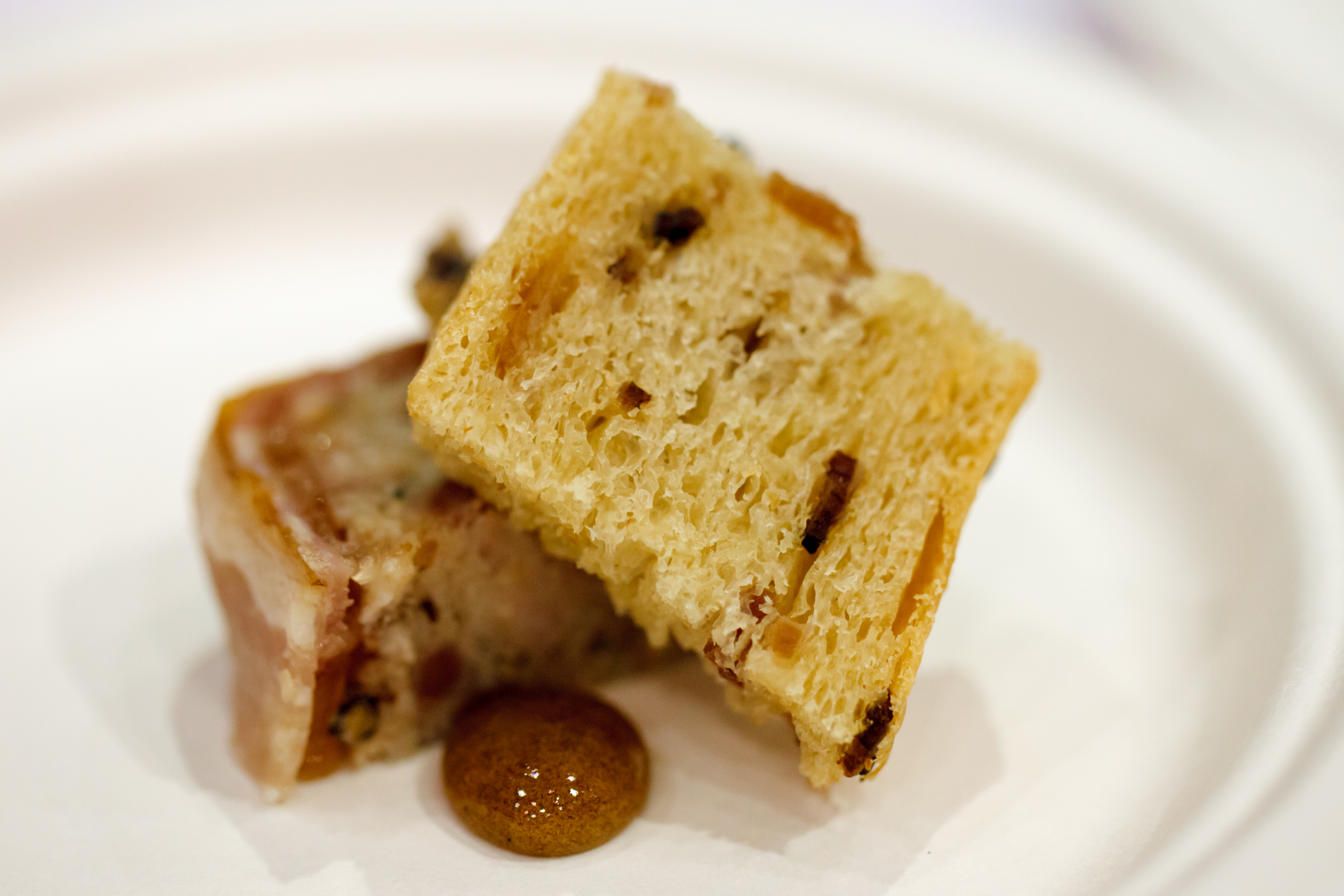
A globule of beer jam aspic prepared with bacon pâté (at bottom)

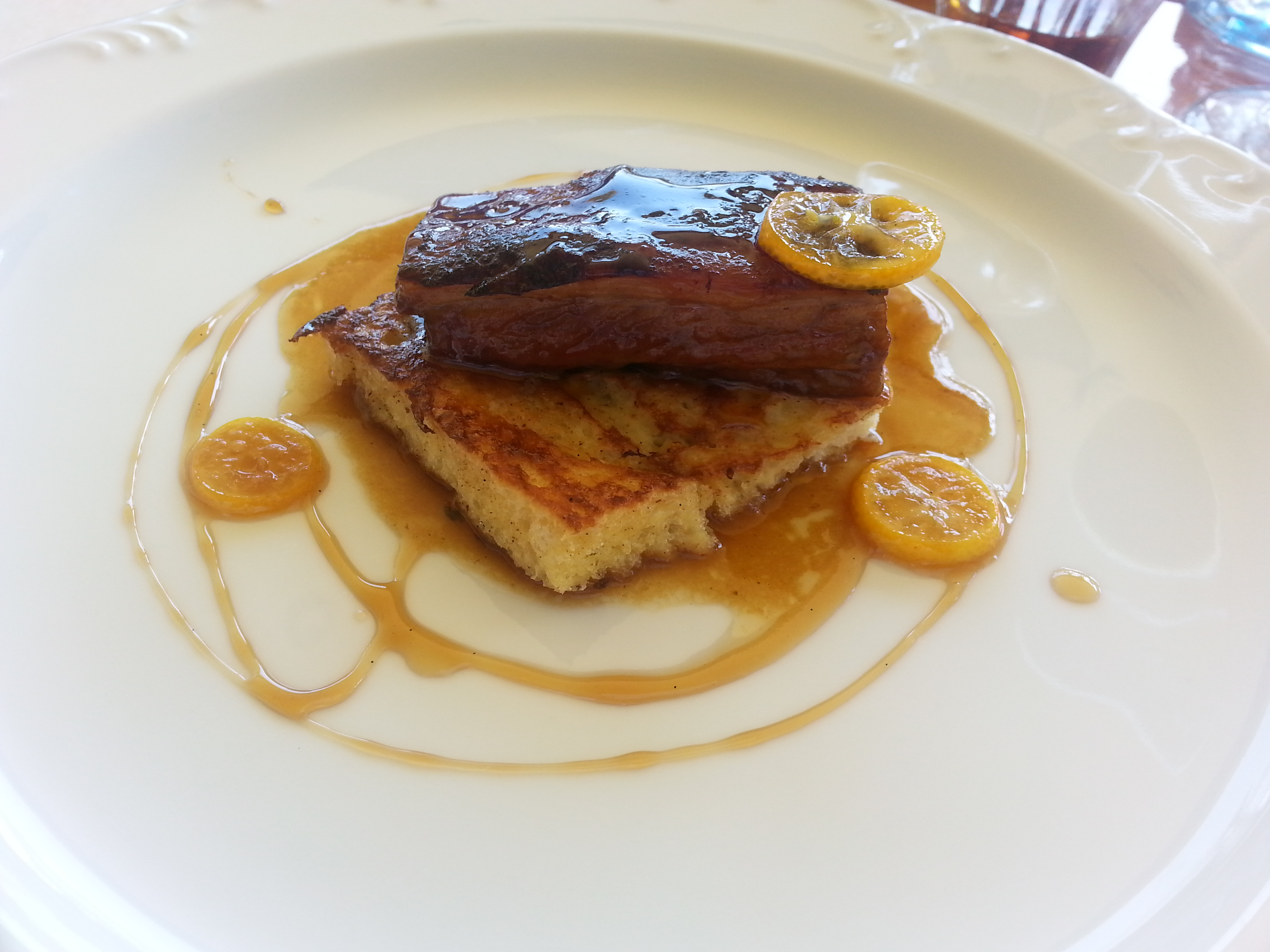
French toast and pork belly served with beer jam

== Commercial varieties ==
Some commercial varieties of beer jam are produced. Al’s Backwoods Berrie Co. in Plymouth, Massachusetts, produces beer jam prepared with Samuel Adams' spicy Cold Snap winter brew. Cleveland Jam of Cleveland, Ohio manufactures and markets beer jams and wine jams. As of July 2015, Cleveland Jam is prepared in James Conti's home, and the company has plans to open a store. The Potlicker Kitchen in Stowe, Vermont, prepares all-beer beer jams using only citrus fruit pectin, which thickens it, and cane sugar to sweeten the product. Potlicker Kitchen beer jams include flavors such as porter, oatmeal stout, IPA and Hefeweizen, and have an alcohol content of 0.5%. Potlicker Kitchen's products are all produced with locally made beer, and most of the alcohol evaporates during the cooking process. Birra Spalmabile is a brand of chocolate beer jam in the United Kingdom that was invented in a collaboration between an Italian brewer and an Italian chocolatier. It has been described as being similar to Nutella, with a beer flavor.

== See also ==
- List of spreads
