= Cashew butter =

Food spread made from baked or roasted cashews

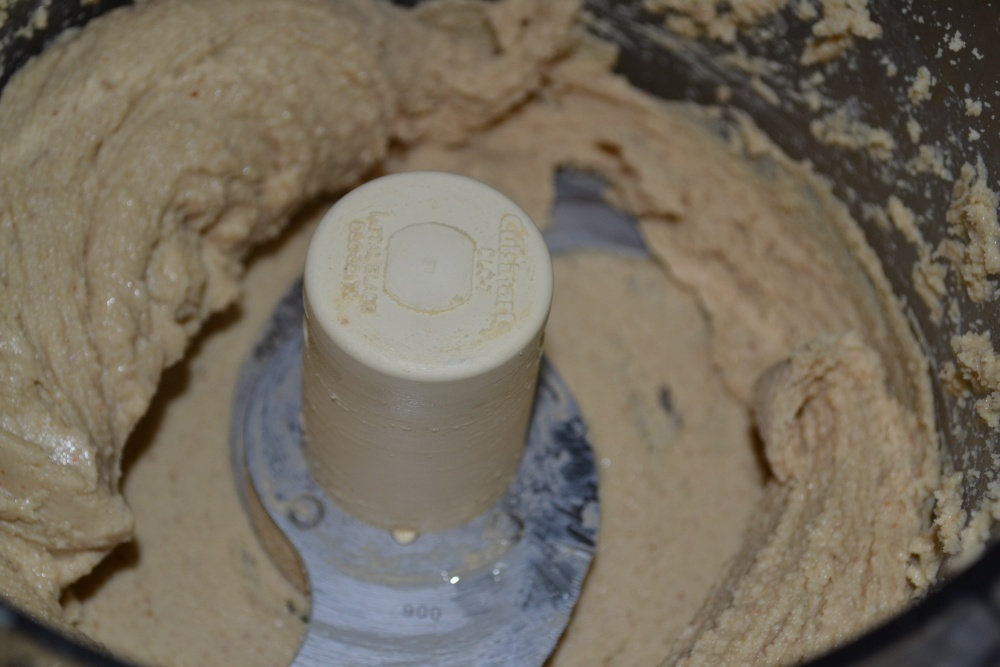
- Cashew butter being ground
- Type: Spread
- Main ingredients: Cashews

Cashew butter is a food spread made from baked or roasted cashews. It is rich and creamy in flavour and when stored the oils and solids separate easily.

Cashew butter is high in protein, unsaturated fats and vitamin B.

One tablespoon of unsalted cashew butter provides 94 calories, 12 percent of the daily value of fat and 8 percent of the daily value of saturated fat, but it contains less fat than most nuts.

Cashew butter was among the foods packaged in metal cans for United States civil defense survival kits during the Cold War.

According to the University of Kentucky Cooperative Extension Service it is better to eat raw cashew butter than the roasted variety, due to the higher nutrient levels.

Cashew butter can be spread on toast, added to smoothies or oatmeal, used as a dip for apple slices or as the base for vegan cashew nut cheese.

== See also ==
- List of spreads
- Nut butter
- Peanut butter
