= Almond butter =

Nut butter made from almonds

- Almond butter
- Type: Spread
- Main ingredients: Almonds

Almond butter is a food paste made from grinding almonds into a nut butter. Almond butter may be "crunchy" or "smooth", and is generally "stir" (susceptible to oil separation) or "no-stir" (emulsified). Almond butter may be either raw or roasted, but this describes the almonds themselves, prior to grinding.

== Compared to peanut butter ==
Almond butter is an alternative to peanut butter for those with peanut allergies. Almond butter contains significantly more fiber, calcium, potassium, iron, and manganese than peanut butter, and about half the saturated fat, although a slightly higher total fat content. Almonds, a type of tree nut, are not legumes, whereas peanuts are, so almond butter can not be consumed by those have tree nut allergies.

== Nutrition ==
Almond butter, plain, without salt added
Nutritional value per 100 g (3.5 oz)
- Energy: 2,648 kJ (633 kcal)
- Carbohydrates: 21 g
- Dietary fiber: 3.7 g
- Fat: 59 g
- Saturated: 5.6 g
- Monounsaturated: 38.3 g
- Polyunsaturated: 12.4 g
- Protein: 15 g
Vitamins and minerals
Minerals	Quantity %DV^{†}
Zinc	27% 3 mg
- ^{†}Percentages estimated using US recommendations for adults.

Almond butter is high in monounsaturated fats, calcium, potassium, iron and manganese. It is considered a good source of riboflavin, phosphorus, and copper, and an excellent source of vitamin E, magnesium, and fiber. Almond butter also provides dietary protein.

== See also ==
- List of almond dishes
- List of spreads
