= Eggplant jam =

Azerbaijani and Turkish jam

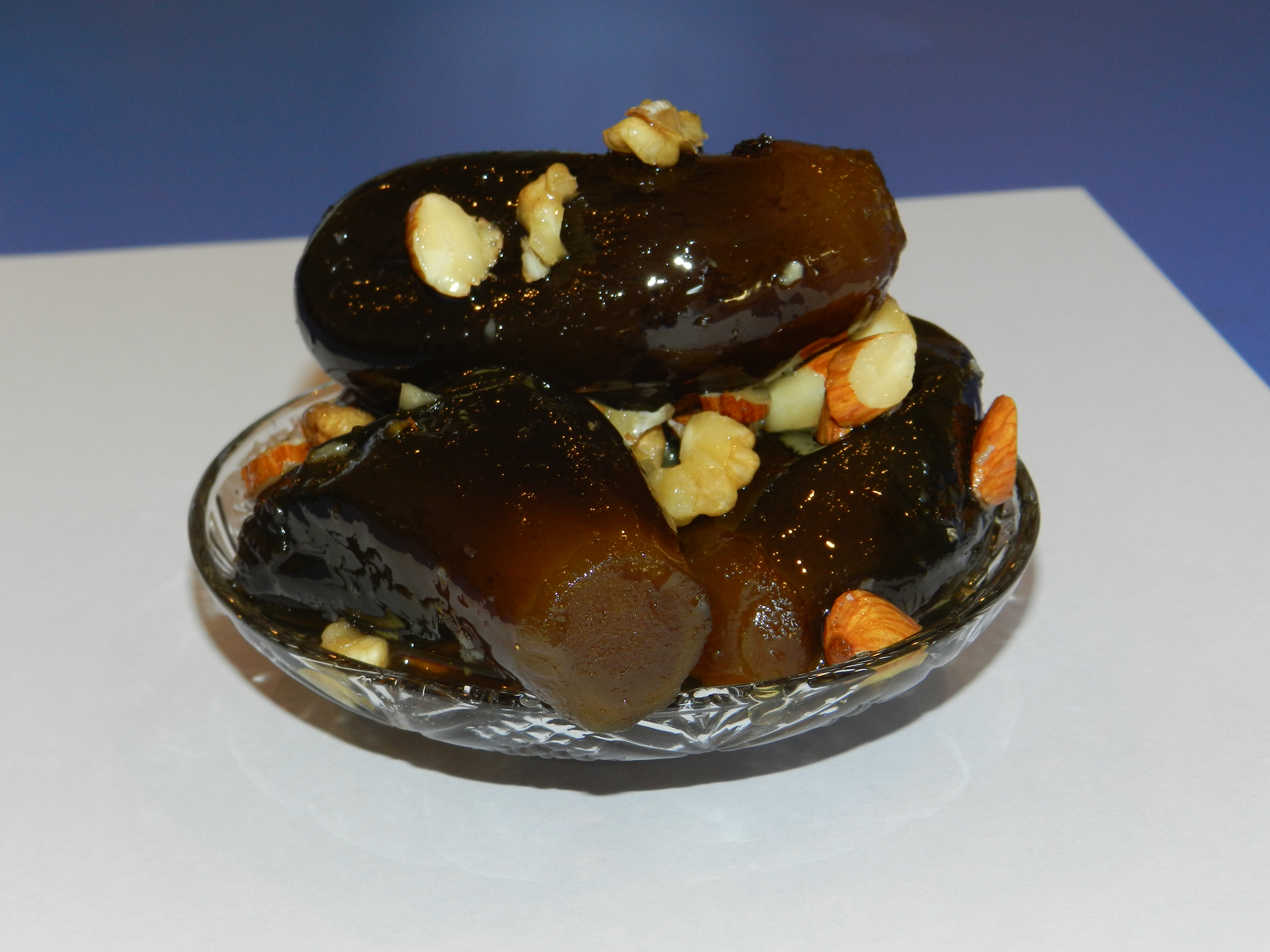
- Eggplant jam from Azerbaijan
- Alternative names: Badımcan mürəbbəsi Patlıcan reçeli
- Type: Jam
- Place of origin: Azerbaijan; Turkey; Syria
- Main ingredients: Eggplant

Eggplant jam (Azerbaijani: Badımcan mürəbbəsi, Turkish: Patlıcan reçeli, Arabic: مربى الباذنجان) is a whole-fruit jam in Azerbaijani, Turkish and Syrian cuisine. In Turkey, it is especially popular in Antalya, Iğdır and Kağızman. The Governorate of Iğdır Province is making efforts to obtain a geographical indication for the name "patlıcan reçeli". In Syria, it is prepared in a similar way but sometimes topped with coconut flakes.

== See also ==
- List of spreads
