= Powdered cheese =

Dehydrated cheese product

Powdered cheese is a processed dairy product made from dehydrated cheese solids. It is commonly used to enhance the flavor and mouthfeel of various food products.

== History ==
Several companies claim to have pioneered the development of powdered cheese, notably the Danish processed-food company Lactosan. The company states that in 1951, after a customer returned an order of processed cheese due to a lack of storage space, factory manager Christian Jessen began experimenting with melted cheese and industrial spray dryers. This led to the creation of what is now known as modern cheese powder, which proved so successful that Lactosan shifted its focus entirely from producing regular processed cheese to specializing in cheese powder. In the United States, Commercial Creamery, the owner of cheesepowder.com, asserts that it has been a trailblazer in manufacturing cheese powders for the food industry for over sixty years.

In 2017, an article by The New York Times raised alarms when it reported the presence of phthalates in boxed macaroni and cheese, particularly in the powdered cheese. Critics noted the report lacked context regarding harmful dosage levels. Experts emphasized that phthalates are common in processed foods due to packaging and manufacturing, and the detected levels posed minimal risk unless consumed in large quantities. The study, published on an advocacy site rather than in a peer-reviewed journal, was criticized for its potential sensationalism.

In August 2022, Kerry Group acquired the B2B powdered cheese business and related assets of The Kraft Heinz Company for consideration of $107.5 million.

Recent market analyses in 2024 indicated rapid growth in the use of powdered cheese as an essential ingredient within the food sector.

== Production ==
Powdered cheese is produced by drying cheese through techniques like spray drying or foam mat drying. During the production process, a certain amount of aroma is inevitably lost, especially during drying. To compensate for this, aged cheese is generally used as the starting material. In cheese powders, either a single cheese variety, blends of various cheeses, or a blend of cheese with other dairy ingredients such as skimmed milk solids, whey, and lactose are typically used. The cheese slurry is concentrated to 35-45% total solids and homogenized before undergoing spray drying.

Powdered cheese is relatively inexpensive to ship and has a longer shelf life compared to its non-powdered counterpart. However, the quality of cheese powder is influenced by storage conditions. Degradation in flavor, color, and texture can occur under adverse conditions, such as in hot and humid climates.

== Uses ==
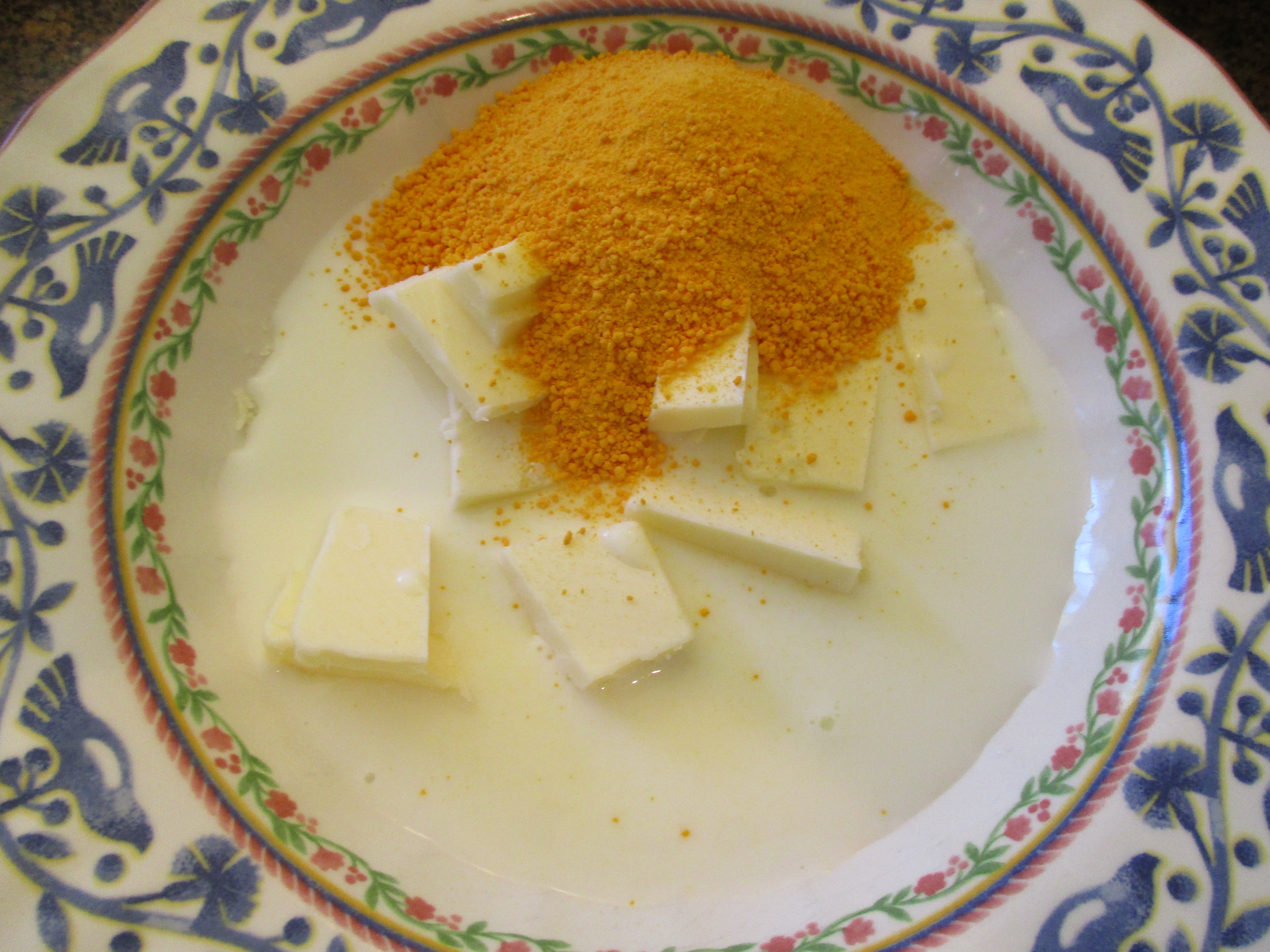
Kraft Dinner, cheese powder and additional ingredients for classic prep

Powdered cheese is a food ingredient commonly used to enhance the flavor and mouthfeel of various food products. It is utilized in items such as crackers, chips, and relish for ready-to-eat products, as well as in salads and fresh vegetables as a flavor-odor additive. It is used as an ingredient in boxed macaroni and cheese (such as Kraft Dinner), Taiwanese pineapple cake, and cheese puffs. Powdered cheese is also used as a nutritional supplement.

Historically, a 1931 public health report noted its use as an "attractive bait" for rat traps. During World War II, the rations of German soldiers included powdered cheese.

== See also ==
- Enzyme-modified cheese
- Powdered milk
- List of dried foods
- Food powder
