= Cheese sauce =

Sauce made with cheese

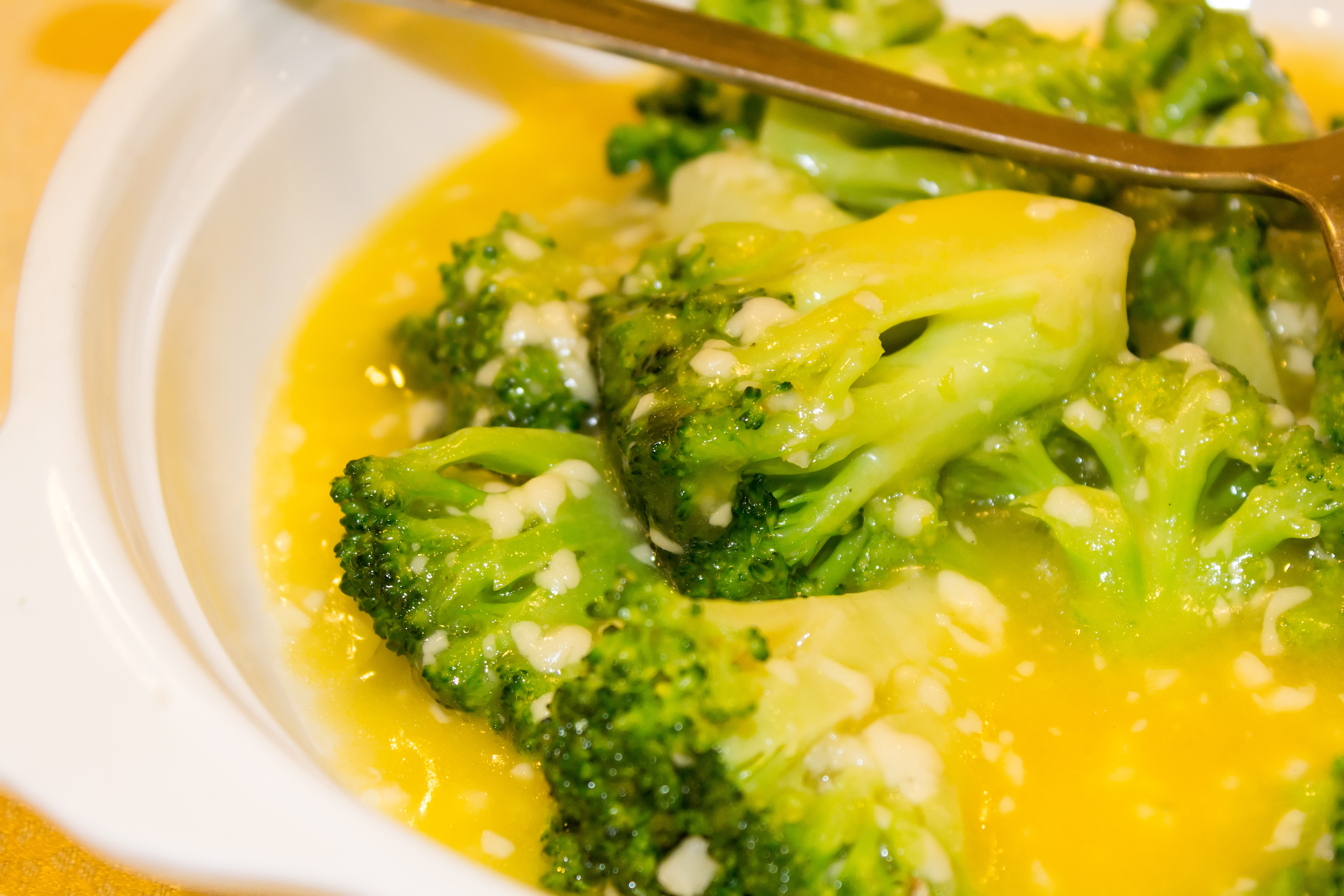
- Broccoli with cheese sauce, at a restaurant in Semarang, Indonesia
- Alternative names: Cheese dip, cheese dipping sauce
- Serving temperature: Can be served cold, warm or hot
- Main ingredients: Cheese, sometimes prepared using processed cheese, dried cheese, or powdered cheese

Cheese sauce is a sauce made with cheese or processed cheese as a primary ingredient. Sometimes dried cheese or powdered cheese is used. Several varieties exist and it has many various culinary uses. Mass-produced commercial cheese sauces are also made by various companies, in both liquid and dry forms. These prepared sauces are used by consumers and restaurants, and commercial formulations are used in the production of various prepared foods, such as macaroni and cheese mixes and frozen meals.

== Varieties ==
Many sauces are prepared with cheese or processed cheese as the primary ingredient.

- Alfredo sauce – an American sauce inspired by Fettuccine Alfredo
- Blue cheese dressing
- Caruso sauce – a South American sauce
- Cheddar sauce
- Chile con queso – has a smooth, creamy texture, and is very popular in the American Southwest
- Crab dip
- Mornay sauce – a French sauce based on béchamel
- Nacho cheese – an American processed cheese sauce

Cheez Whiz is an American brand of processed cheese spread produced by Kraft Foods since the 1950s. It was developed as an easy way to prepare the sauce for Welsh rarebit. It was initially sold in glass jars, and today is sold in jars and spray cans. Cheez Whiz is commonly used for a cheesesteak.

Varieties

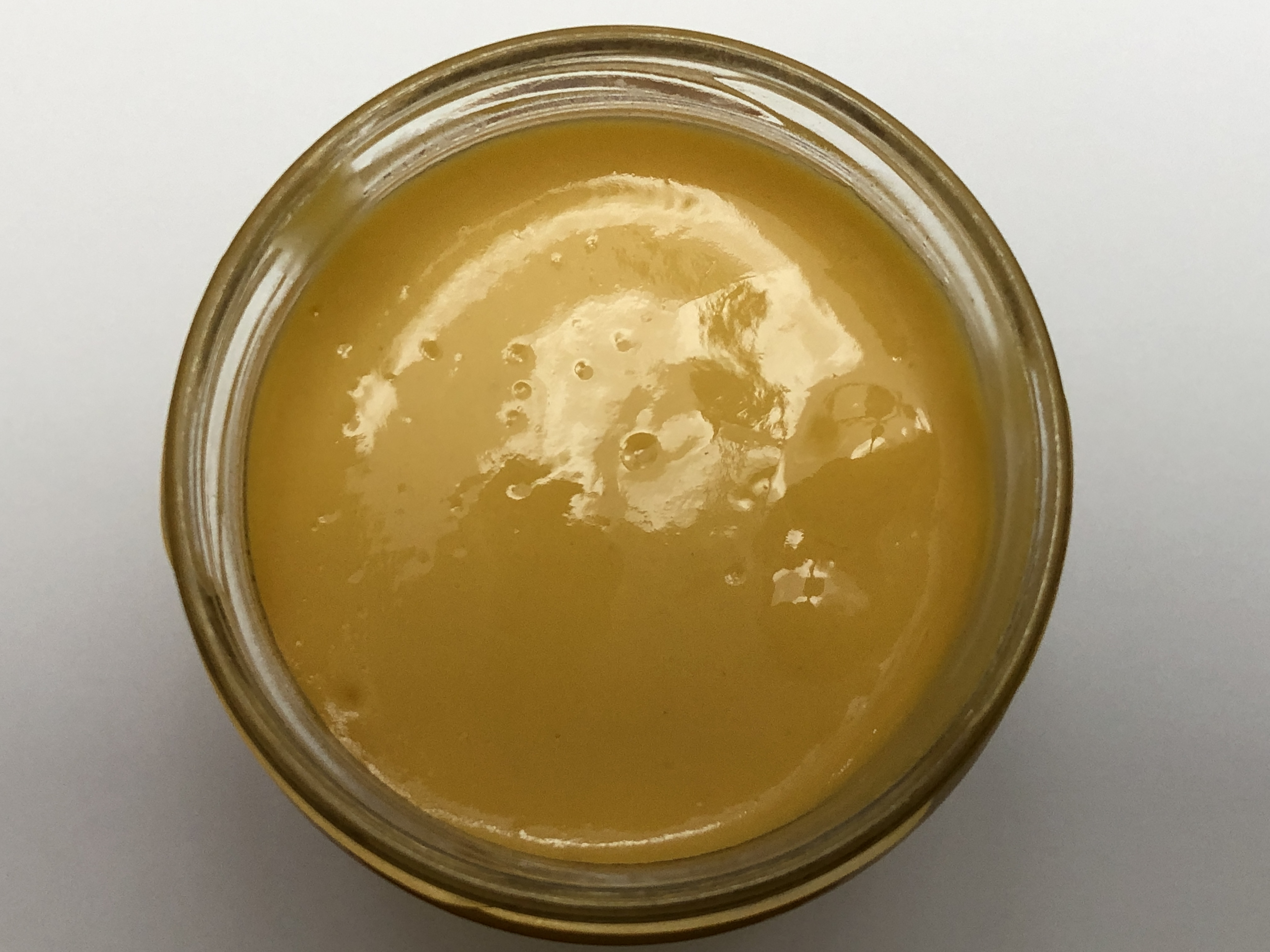
An open jar of Cheez Whiz

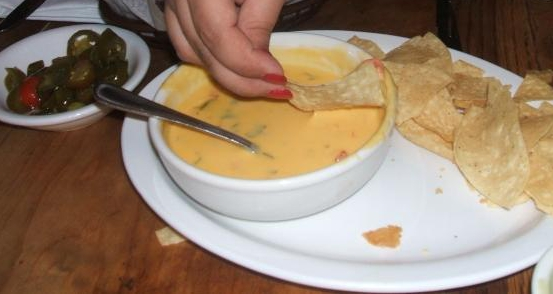
Chile con queso with tortilla chips

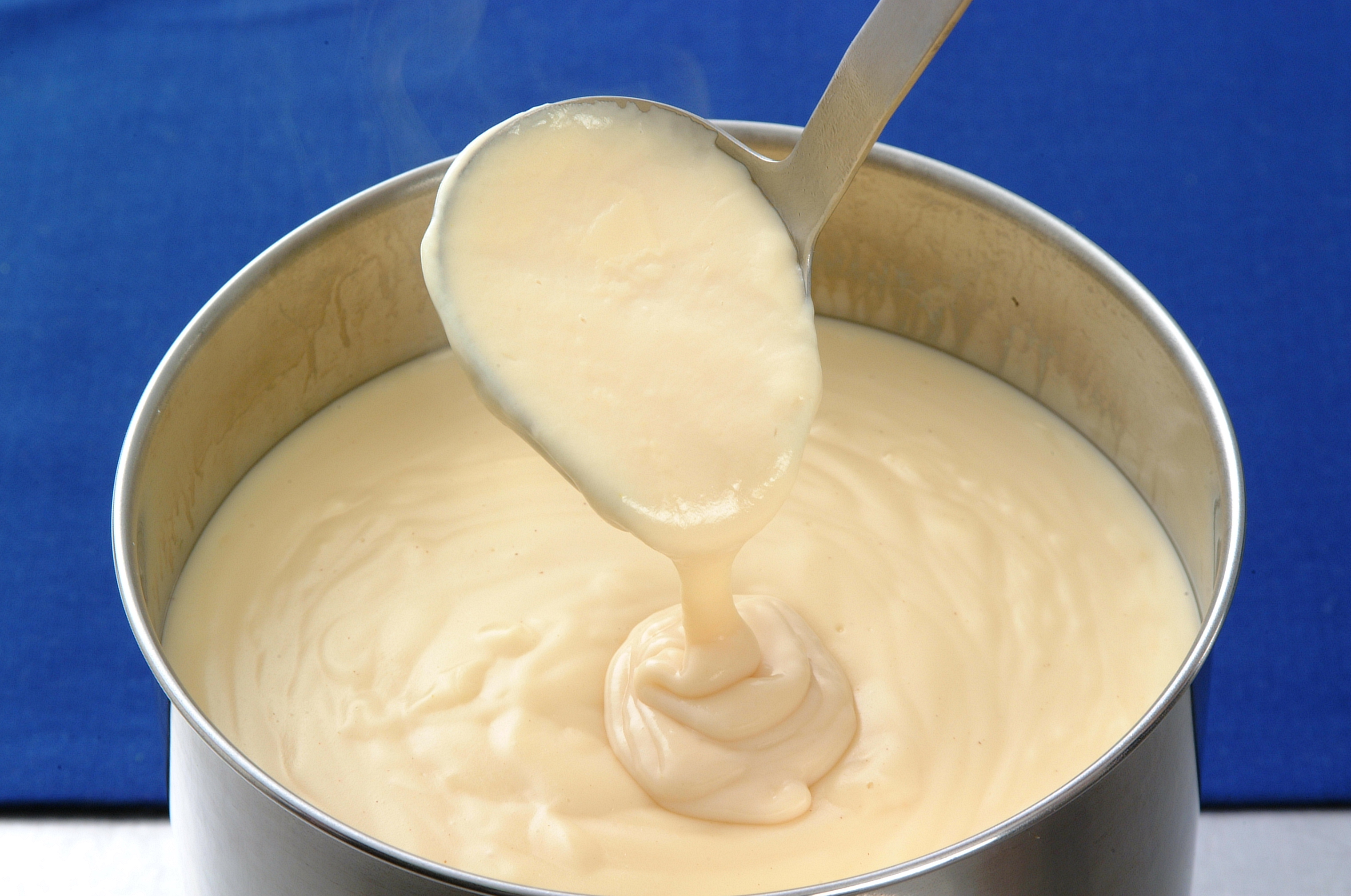
Mornay sauce

== Culinary uses ==
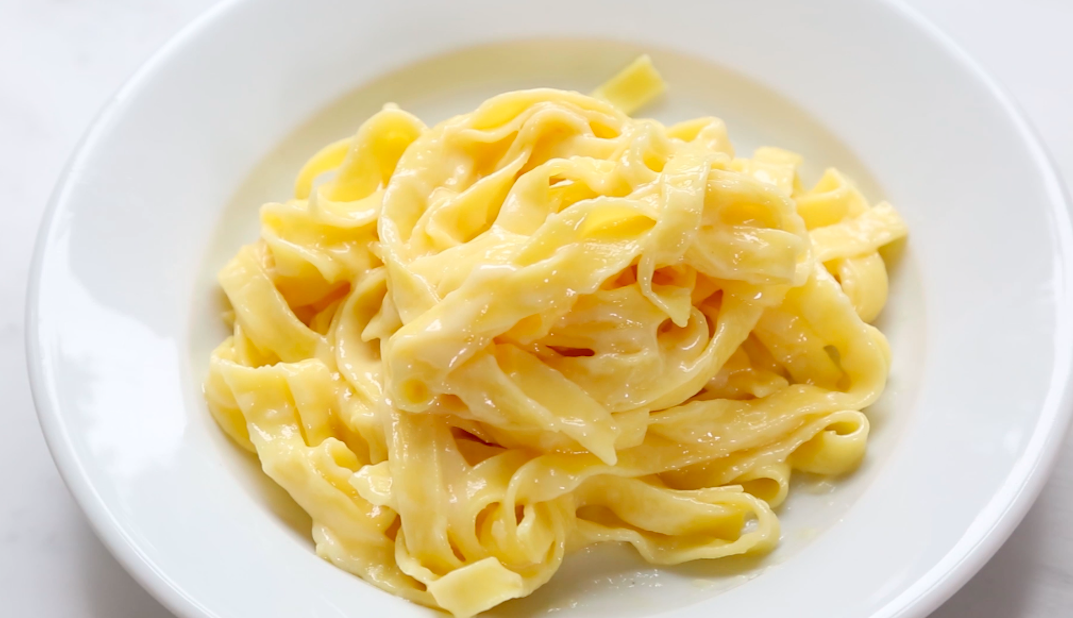
Fettuccine Alfredo, prepared with a butter and Parmigiano-Reggiano mixture that forms a cheese sauce as it cooks

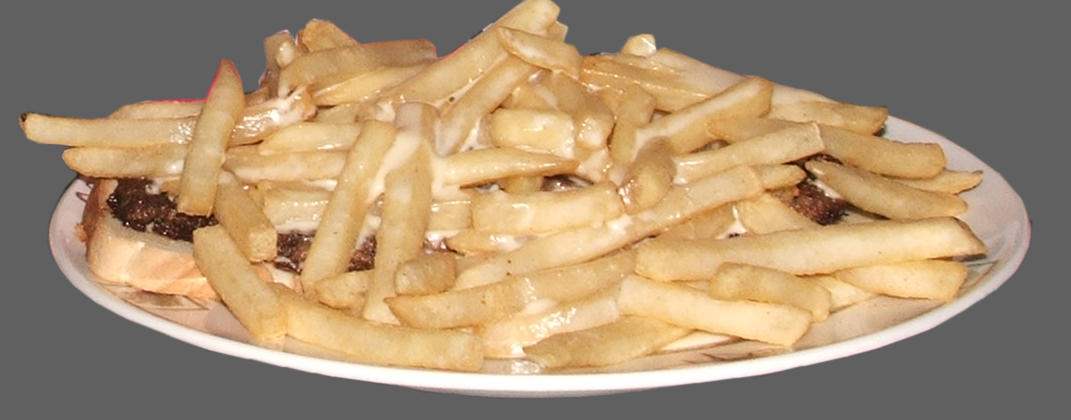
A horseshoe sandwich

Cheese sauce is commonly used as a dip for various foods, such as chips and vegetables. It is also used as an ingredient or topping for many various dishes and side dishes, such as sandwiches, roasted potatoes, casseroles, pasta dishes, egg, fish and meat dishes and in soups.

Many dishes are prepared using cheese sauce:

- Almadroc
- Cheese fries
- Cheesesteak
- Fettuccine Alfredo
- Fondue – a Swiss melted cheese dish, the sauce typically consists of a blend of cheeses, wine, and seasoning
- Horseshoe sandwich
- Lokshen mit kaese
- Macaroni and cheese
- Nachos
- Tetrazzini
- Welsh rarebit – a dish of cheese sauce over toast, and sometimes the sauce itself

== Industrial products ==
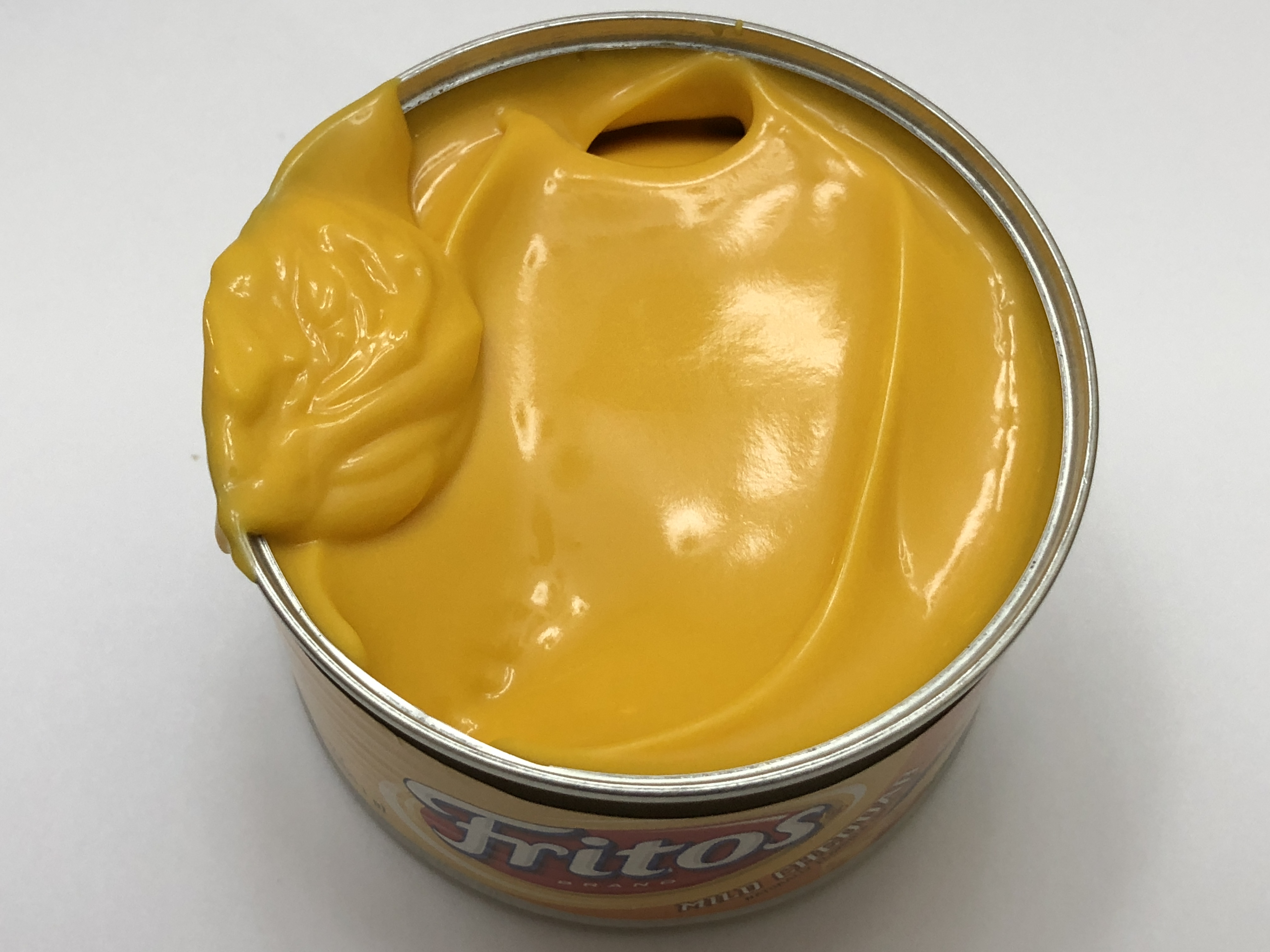
A can of mass-produced Fritos cheese sauce

Cheese sauce is a mass-produced product in the United States and other countries, such as China and Switzerland. In the U.S., commercial preparations are available to consumers in grocery stores and are used in family-style, casual and fast-food restaurants.

Mass-produced cheese sauce is typically prepared aseptically and then packaged in sterile cans, bottles and bag-in-box containers. Some varieties are sold in aerosol cans. Commercial cheese sauces may be prepared using natural cheese, processed cheese, or both. (Note: Last but not least, there is no existing standard for processed cheese 'sauce'. i.e. natural and/or analogue...") Various food additives and preservatives may be used in commercial preparations to create a uniform product that is consistent and stabilized in texture, consistency, color and flavor, to enhance flavor, and to ensure freshness. Some additives and preservatives used may include carrageenan, citric acid, monosodium glutamate, sodium citrate, sorbic acid, and xanthan gum, among others.

The industrial preparation and processing of liquid cheese sauces typically involve the shredding of bulk cheese products which is then placed en masse into a large processing container along with various dry ingredients and emulsifying salts. The mixture is agitated to create a slurry, and is then aseptically treated using various machines to heat and sterilize the product and make it pourable, after which sterile bottles, jars or cans are filled with the product. Such aseptically processed cheese sauces are typically shelf-stable, requiring no refrigeration until opened.

Bag-in-box cheese sauces are typically used in retail environments and involve the use of connecting a bag of aseptically treated cheese sauce to a vessel that heats it and keeps it warm at a food-safe temperature. A pump dispenser is used that delivers the sauce to various items, such as tortilla chips and sandwiches.

Cheese sauces are also mass-produced in a powdered dry mix form. These are produced as an instant food and purveyed to consumers in sauce mix packets and jars. Dry mix packets are also provided in some dry macaroni and cheese products.

Commercial frozen cheese sauce is used as an ingredient in prepared frozen meals and prepared frozen vegetables. In some instances, particularly when a sauce has a high-fat content, the product may require emulsification to keep the product uniform and prevent it from separating. Factors in frozen sauces such as their overall fat content and the size of particulates in them plays a role in how various frozen cheese sauces are formulated, cooked, treated and processed.

Additionally, commercial cheese sauce formulations have been used as an ingredient in processed canned vegetables in the United States.

Circa the later 2000s, Campbell's began to modify its canned cheese sauce formulas based upon the company's perceived consumer preferences in various geographic regions in the United States. The company concluded that the sauce was not considered hot enough (pungent) for average consumers in the American Southwest and West while being too hot for consumers in the Eastern United States. At the time, to better serve its customer base, Campbell's began manufacturing a hotter product in their California and Texas plants compared to their other plants.

In July 2018, Kraft Heinz issued a voluntary nationwide product recall in the United States of around 100,000 jars of cheese dip, due to a potential for the growth of clostridium botulinum because of ingredient separation. It was only distributed in the United States, and consumers were advised not to eat it, even if it lacked signs of spoilage.

Commercial cheese sauces

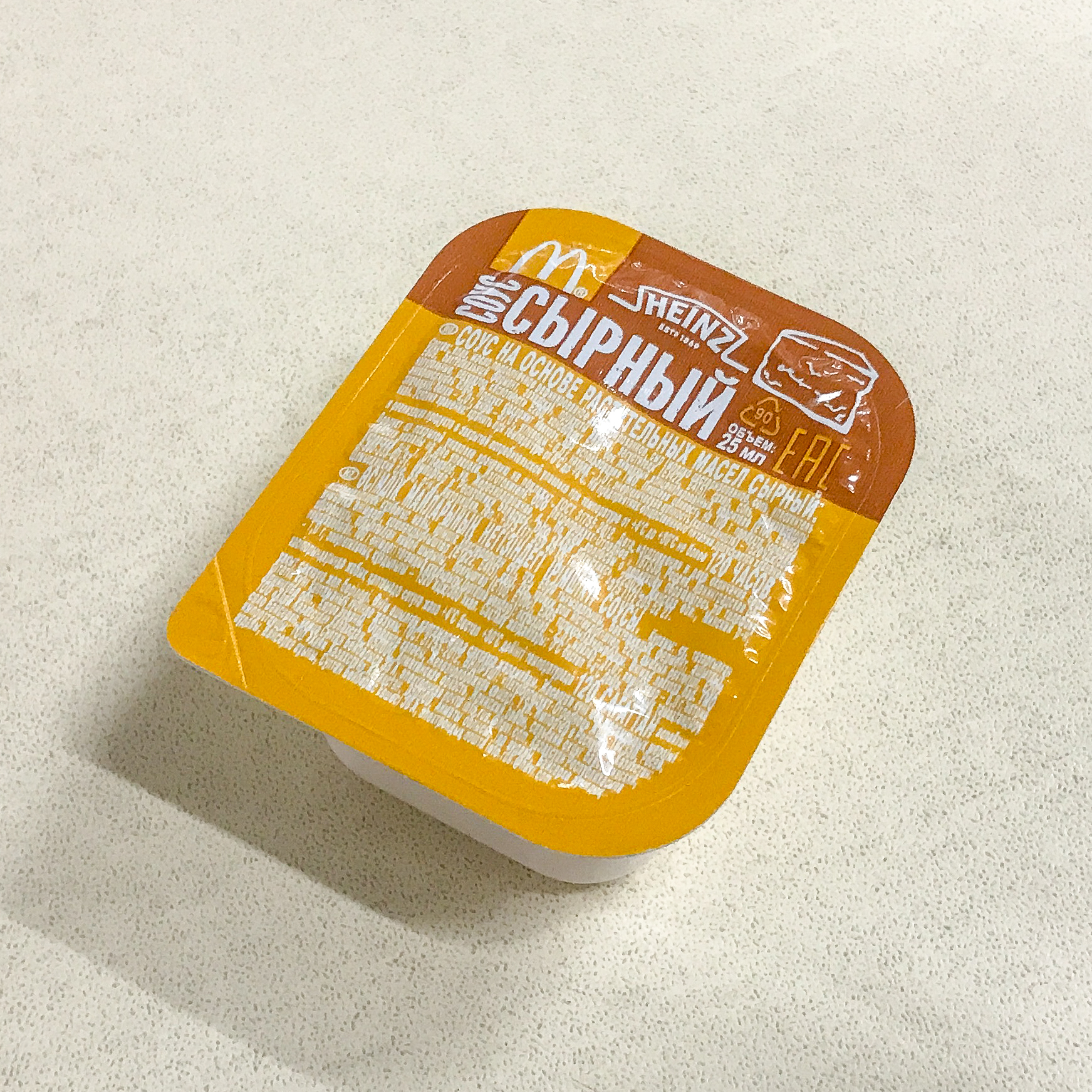
A packet of mass-produced Heinz cheese sauce at a McDonald's restaurant in Moscow, Russia

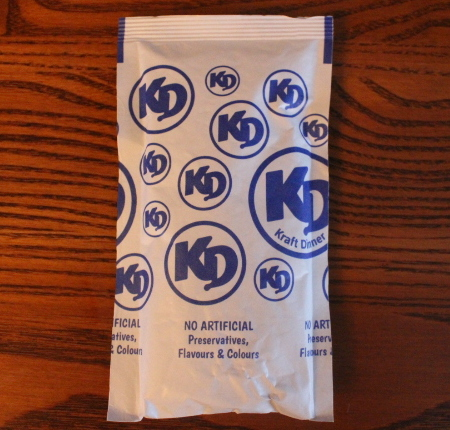
Kraft Dinner is packaged with a processed powdered cheese sauce packet (Canada, 2018).

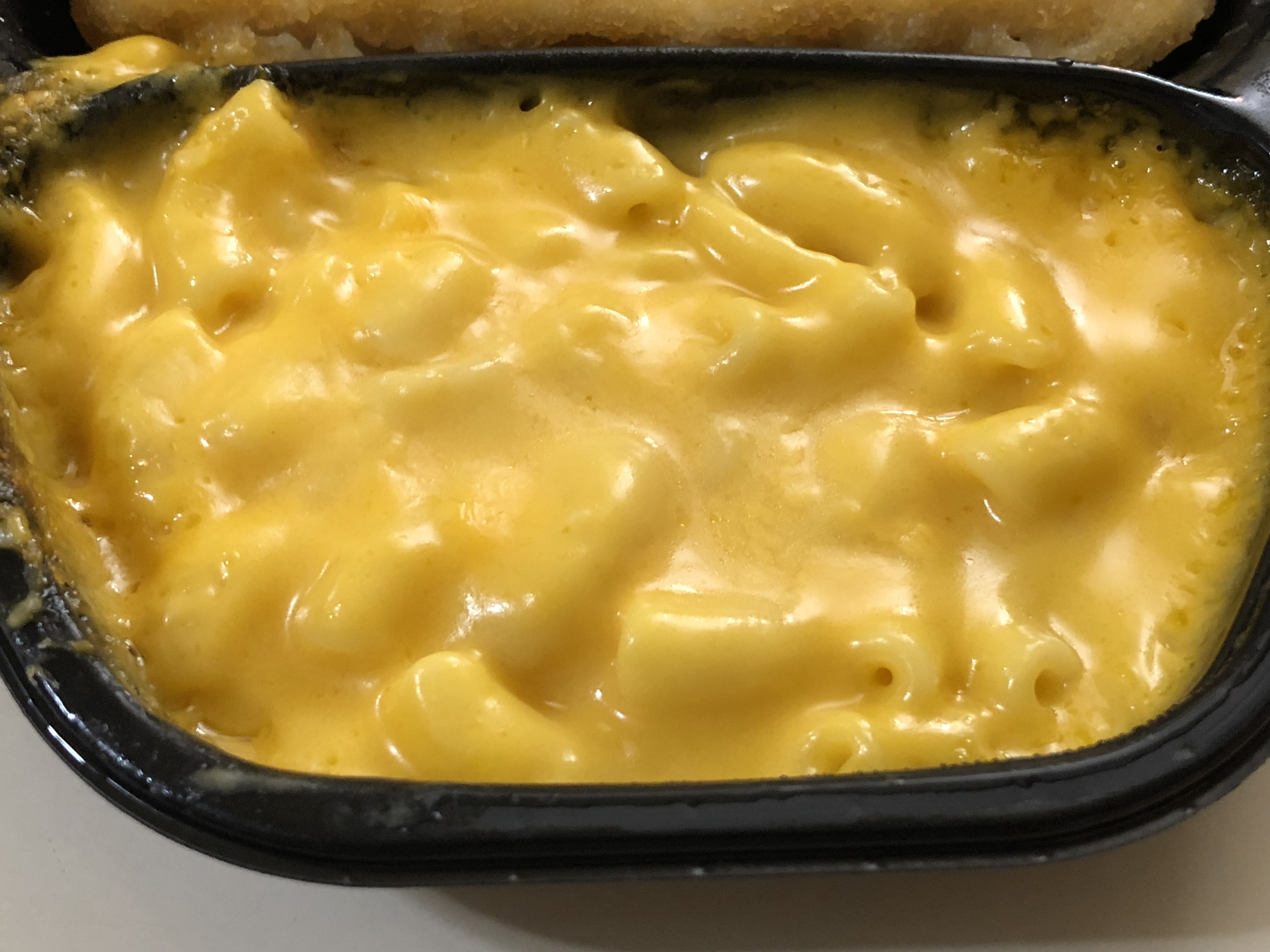
A serving of macaroni and cheese included as part of a frozen meal with frozen cheese sauce as an ingredient

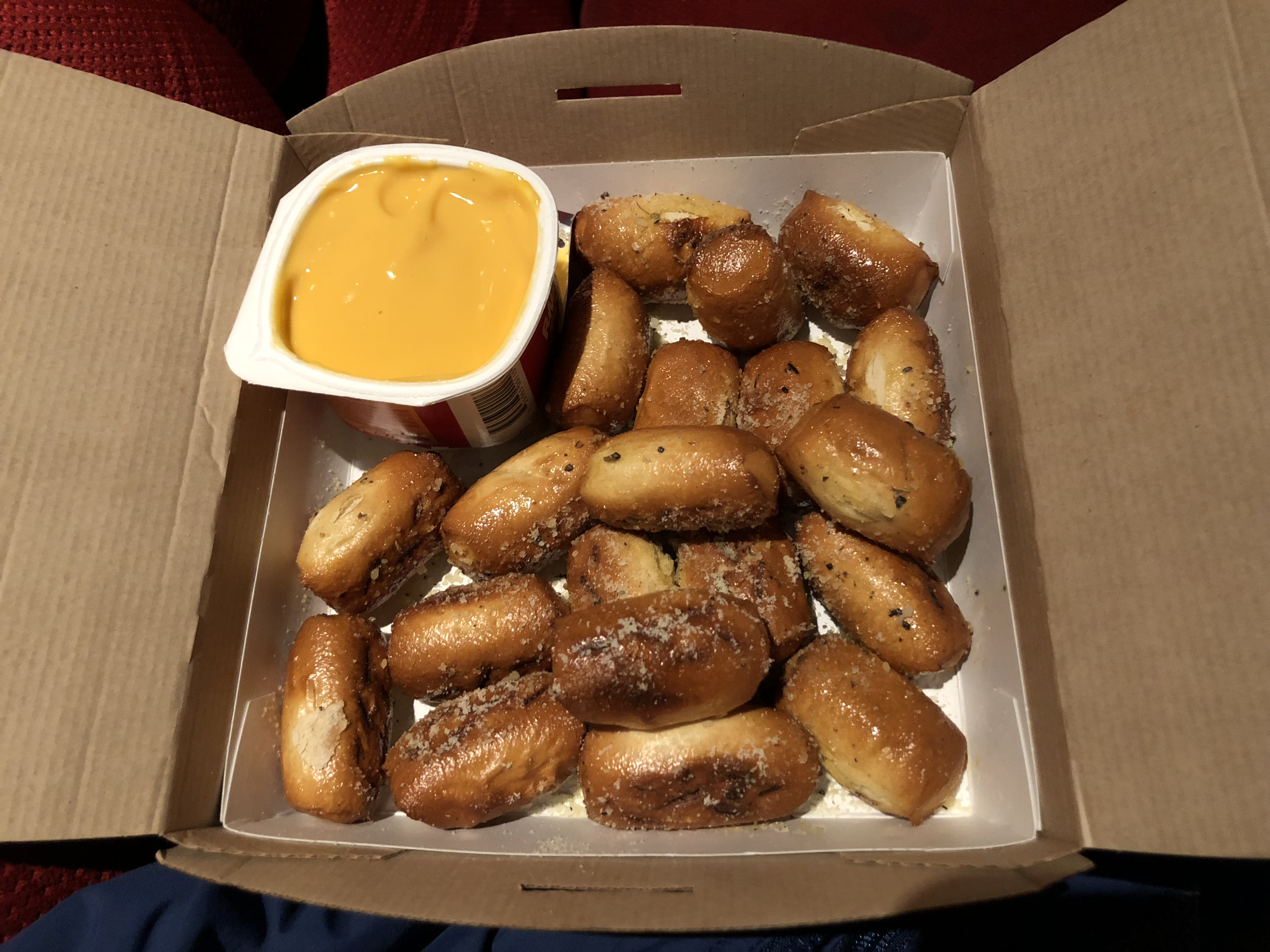
Pretzel bites with a commercial cheese sauce at a movie theater in the United States

Cheddar cheese sauce in plastic squeeze bottles produced by Turkish food manufacturer Sauchef

== See also ==
- Mornay sauce
- Cheese soup
- Easy Cheese
- List of cheese dishes
- List of sauces
- Pimento cheese – a cheese-based spread
