= Easy Cheese =

Canned processed cheese product

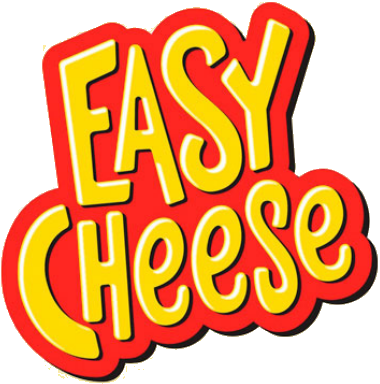

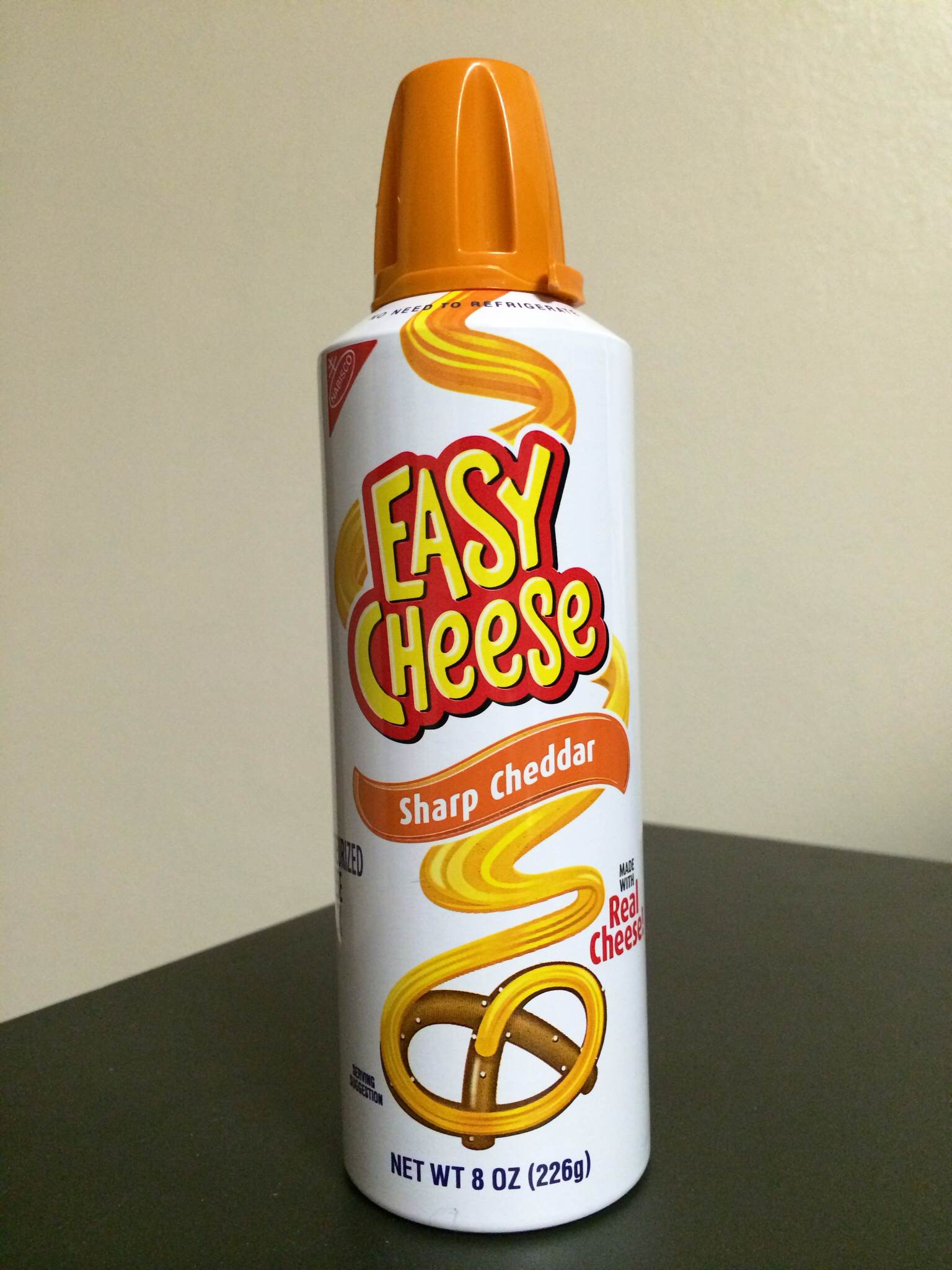
- An 8 oz (230 g) can of Easy Cheese
- Product type: Processed cheese
- Current owner: Mondelēz International
- Country: United States
- Introduced: 1965; 61 years ago
- Previous owners: Nabisco
- Website: snackworks.com/easycheese

Easy Cheese is the trademark for a processed cheese spread product distributed by Mondelēz International. It is also commonly referred to by generic terms such as "spray cheese", "squirt cheese", "cheese in a can", and/or "cheese cans". Easy Cheese is packaged in a metal can filled with air covered with a plastic cap that reveals a straight, flexible nozzle where the cheese is extruded.

A similar product was released by Betty Lou Foods in 1963. Easy Cheese was first manufactured by Nabisco and sold under the name Snack Mate from 1965 until 1984. Advertisements often displayed the orange product adorned in flowy peaks atop several different types of appetizers. As a 1966 advertisement says, it was "instant cheese for instant parties." Easy Cheese is currently available in Cheddar and American Cheese flavors. Discontinued varieties include Sharp Cheddar, Cheddar n' bacon, Nacho, Blue Cheese, Pizza, French Onion, Pimento and Shrimp Cocktail.

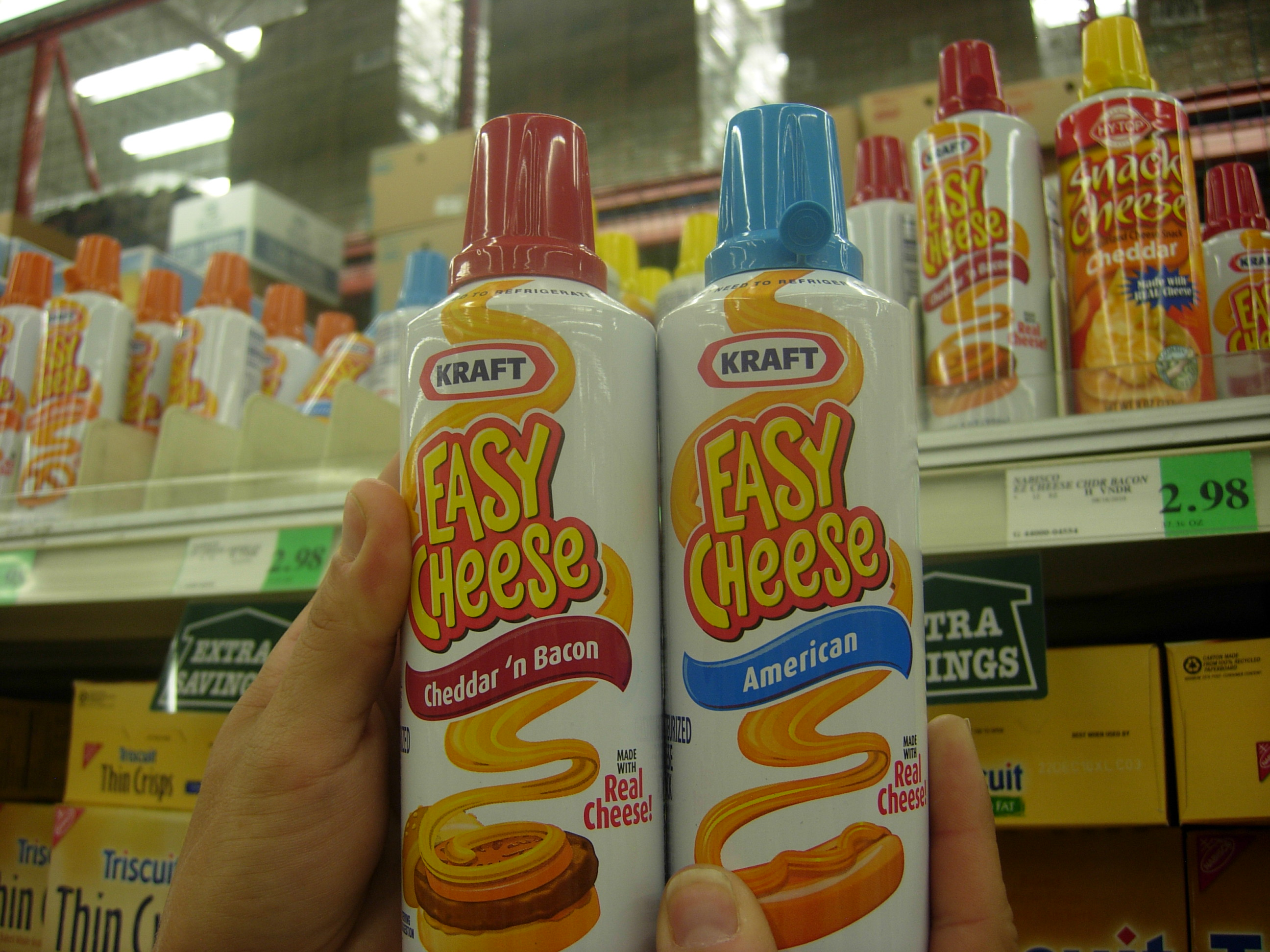
Cans of Kraft Cheddar 'N' Bacon (discontinued) and American Easy Cheese among other varieties in Alaska in 2010.

== Ingredients ==
Easy Cheese contains milk, water, whey protein concentrate, canola oil, milk protein concentrate, sodium citrate, sodium phosphate, calcium phosphate, lactic acid, sorbic acid, sodium alginate, apocarotenal, annatto, cheese culture, and enzymes.

== Physical-chemical properties ==
=== Molecular composition ===
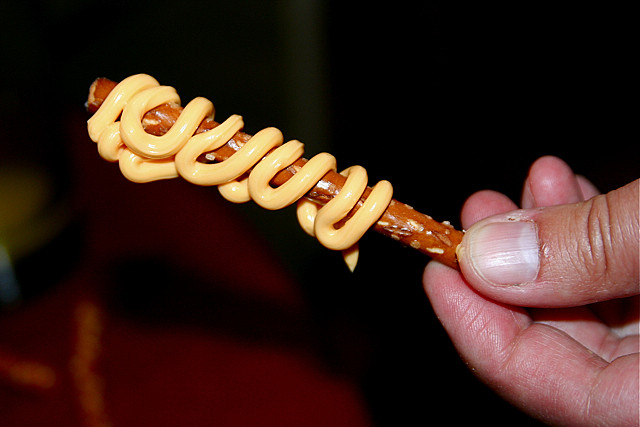
Easy Cheese on a pretzel

Processed cheese spreads, like Easy Cheese, have a moisture content that ranges from 44 to 60%, while its milk fat content must be greater than 20%. Milk proteins are needed for processed cheese spread production, and contains two main types: casein, which accounts for at least 80%, and whey protein, which can further be classified into α-lactalbumin and β-lactoglobulin. The manufacturing of processed cheese spreads uses natural cheese with a composition that ranges from 60 to 75% intact casein.

==== Water ====
Water plays a multitude of functions in Easy Cheese. First, it allows for more stable emulsion, serving as a medium for the hydrophilic moieties of chelating salts. More specially, chelating salts bind calcium ions to hydrate proteins and create a more uniform spread. Water also provides the moisture content needed in processed cheese spreads to achieve the desired texture for extrusion and consumption.

=== Physical structure ===
==== Casein and emulsifying agents ====
Easy Cheese is an oil-in-water emulsion. Oil droplets typically have a diameter of no more than one micrometer. Emulsions with large droplets like this tend to have a low-medium viscosity in comparison to smaller droplets whose emulsions have a higher viscosity. Heating the cheese mixture causes separation of the fats and protein of the cheese emulsion from destabilization. Emulsifying agents are made up of amphiphilic molecules that act as an interface to reduce the surface tension between hydrophilic and hydrophobic molecules of the product to result in a uniform cheese spread that does not separate during storage. Cheese proteins that have denatured during processing are reestablished using melting salts. Sodium citrate and sodium phosphate are the main emulsifiers used in Easy Cheese to sequester calcium in cheddar cheese. This occurrence hydrates and solubilizes the casein, causing it to swell with water.

The key role of emulsifying agents in Easy Cheese is to create a uniform cheese spread by altering the structure of casein micelles in the cheese. Casein micelles have a diameter ranging from 15 to 20 nanometers and are composed of flexible aggregates alpha-, beta-, and kappa-casein. The alpha- and beta-casein are kept in place by “colloidal calcium phosphate-mediated cross links” covered with a kappa-casein outer layer. The outer layer on the casein's surface has glycosylated hydrophilic tails that are negatively charged and is stable in solution due to Van der Waals interactions. All of the negative charges causes the casein micelles to initially repel each other and provides stability to the matrix by protecting the alpha- and beta-caseins.

When the group of casein micelles are exposed to heat and shearing forces, kappa-casein is cleaved causing the displacement of the glycosylated hydrophilic tails. The casein micelle becomes destabilized as alpha and beta-casein are now exposed to the environment. Emulsifying agents such as sodium phosphate play an important role in stabilizing the newly destabilized structure. The hydrophilic portion of sodium phosphate removes calcium from the calcium paracaseinate from ion exchange reactions. This action causes “hydration and partial dispersion of the calcium-paracaseinate phosphate network." The hydration process increases the solubility of the protein. Sodium phosphate removes calcium from the Ca-paracaseinate cheese complex due to ion exchange interactions, where positive calcium ions bind to the negative phosphate groups. Phosphate and citrate anions can then bind to the protein structure, converting calcium-paracaseinate converts to water-soluble sodium-paracaseinate.

==== Viscosity ====
Whey products in processed cheese spreads increases the viscosity of the overall product due to the “intermolecular interactions between adjacent protein molecules with the formation of weak transient networks” formed from the conglomerate cheese mass. The protein concentration within the cheese matrix is directly proportional to the viscosity of the solution due to their interactions with hydrated protein molecules. Therefore, the continuous phase of the oil-in-water emulsion has a greater contribution to the viscosity of the cheese product over than the discontinuous phase.

==== Flow properties ====
Easy Cheese exhibits pseudoplastic behaviors during extrusion of the product, which can be represented using the Herschel-Bulkley Model:

$$\sigma = K \dot\gamma^n$$

This power law model represents a type of non-Newtonian fluid relating shear rate and shear stress with viscosity. As cheese is pushed out of the can, shear rate increases causing a decrease in viscosity and higher flow rates of the material. In this case, the cheese behaves more as a fluid. After it is expelled, there is no more shear rate and the cheese retains its original higher viscosity. Here, the cheese behaves like a solid.

Sodium alginate is one of the main ingredients that is responsible for Easy Cheese's pseudoplastic characteristics. More specifically, it contributes to the integrity of the gel-like network formed by the casein and salts. The newly formed network is made possible through cation binding, which converts the hydrophilic sodium alginate into hydrophobic calcium alginate. Guluronic acid residues that are linked together demonstrate a high affinity for calcium ions. Sodium alginate works in conjunction with the destabilization of the casein micelle where calcium ions can interact with guluronic chains. Due to a mixture of these interactions, a gel-like structure is formed rather than a true gel structure. About 0.05–0.5% weight by volume of sodium alginate at a 5.4–5.7 range must be added to the cheese mixture to exhibit these properties during extrusion.

== See also ==
- American cheese – Type of processed cheese
- Cheese – Curdled milk food product
- Cheese sauce – Sauce made with cheese
- Cheez Whiz – Processed cheese sauce
- Government cheese – Commodity cheese controlled by American government
- Velveeta – Pasteurized prepared cheese product by Kraft
