= Cheez Whiz =

Processed cheese sauce

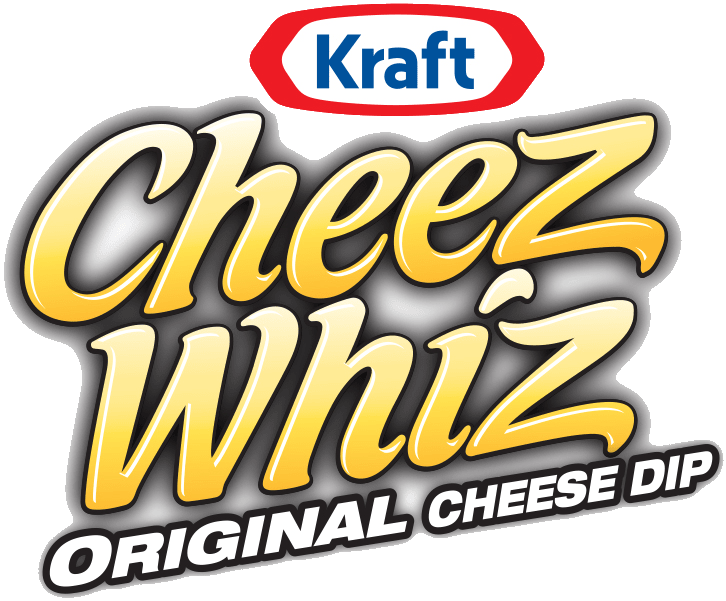

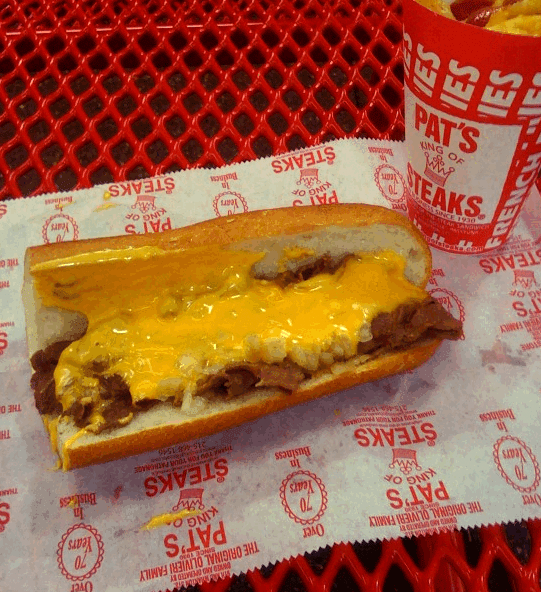
- A cheesesteak sandwich with Cheez Whiz at Pat's King of Steaks
- Product type: Sauce
- Current owner: Kraft Heinz
- Produced by: Kraft Foods
- Country: U.S.
- Introduced: 1952; 74 years ago

Cheez Whiz is a brand of processed cheese sauce and spread produced by Kraft Foods. It was developed by a team led by food scientist Edwin Traisman (1915–2007). It was first sold in 1952, and, with some changes in formulation, continues to be in production today.

Orangish-yellow in color, it usually comes in a glass jar and is used as a topping for various foods, including corn chips and hot dogs. It is also frequently used as the cheese in a Philadelphia-style cheesesteak. It is marketed in Canada, Mexico, the Philippines, the United States, and Venezuela. In the United States, it has a reputation as being junk food.

== History ==
Cheez Whiz was first developed as a pre-prepared cheese sauce for the traditional British dish Welsh rarebit, by a team at Kraft (U.S.) including Edwin Traisman. It was introduced in the United Kingdom in 1952, the same year it was first marketed in the United States.

== Ingredients ==
Cheez Whiz Original Cheese Dip
Nutritional value per 2 tbsp (33 g)
- Energy: 80 kcal (330 kJ)
- Carbohydrates: 5 g
- Sugars: 3 g
- Dietary fibre: 0 g
- Fat: 5 g
- Saturated: 1 g
- Trans: 0 g
- Protein: 3 g
Vitamins and minerals
Minerals	Quantity %DV^{†}
Sodium	18% 410 mg
- Other constituents: Quantity
- Cholesterol: 5 mg
- ^{†}Percentages estimated using US recommendations for adults. Source: Kraftapps.com

A 1953 ad in Kraft Foods’ home city, Chicago, included a label illustration listing the product’s original ingredients: “American Cheese, Water, Nonfat Dry Milk Solids, Condensed Whey, Sodium Phosphate, Cream, Worcestershire Sauce, Lactic Acid, Mustard, Salt, U.S. Certified Color--Moisture 52%, Milkfat 28%.”

In 1958 (U.S.) national advertising, the ingredient list (on product label) was very similar: “American Cheese, Water, Condensed Whey, Nonfat Dry Milk, Sodium Phosphate, Cream, Salt, Lactic Acid, Worcestershire Sauce, Mustard, Artificial Color--Moisture 52%, Milkfat 20%”--and 1964's was identical, as was 1972's. Canada's ingredients weren't necessarily identical; for 1975 they were listed as "Canadian Cheese, Water, Milk Solids, Butter, Sodium Phosphate, Salt, Worcestershire Sauce, Mustard Flour, Sorbic Acid, Natural Color."

As of 2016, Kraft describes Cheez Whiz as a "cheese dip" with the word cheese spelled correctly. According to a Kraft spokesman, the product does include cheese, but the company has chosen to list its parts—such as cheese culture and milk—instead of cheese as a component itself.

Ingredients: whey, milk, canola oil, maltodextrin, milk protein concentrate, sodium phosphate, contains less than 2% of modified food starch, salt, lactic acid, whey protein concentrate, mustard flour, Worcestershire sauce (vinegar, molasses, corn syrup, water, salt, caramel color, garlic powder, sugar, spices (contains celery), tamarind, natural flavor), sodium alginate, sorbic acid as a preservative, color added, cheese culture, enzymes, natural flavor

== Sizes ==
In some markets, the product has been sold in a narrow jar that tapered narrower towards the base, and sold as a spread. When Cheez Whiz is advertised as a dip or a sauce, the jars are larger and more of a squat cylindrical shape.

== Varieties ==
Varieties include:

- Cheez Whiz
- Cheez Whiz Light
- Cheez Whiz Tex Mex
- Salsa Con Queso
- Cheez Whiz Italia
- Cheez Whiz Bacon
- Cheez Whiz Pimento

Cheez Whiz can also be found in "Handi Snacks" products such as Ritz Cheez Whiz 'n' Crackers in Canada.

Cheez Whiz was reformulated in the early 21st century. The new formula is used for Cheez Whiz Light (15.5 oz) as well as the Original Big Cheese (15 oz). The products' jars were also widened to allow dipping.

== Formula change ==
Over the years since the product's creation, Kraft has altered its recipe due to changes in dairy sourcing and the regulatory environment, resulting in a reduction of cheese content. Kraft also made a change in the way that it lists its ingredients; away from listing components (like cheese) to listing its parts (such as milk and cheese culture). Such changes are common throughout the food industry, and are often done without announcement.

Dean Southworth, who was part of the original team that developed Cheez Whiz in the 1950s, described a jar he sampled in 2001 as tasting "like axle grease".

== See also ==
- Cheese sauce
- Easy Cheese – a form of cheese product in a spray can
- Kraft Dinner
- Plant cheese
- Velveeta
