= American cheese =

Type of processed cheese

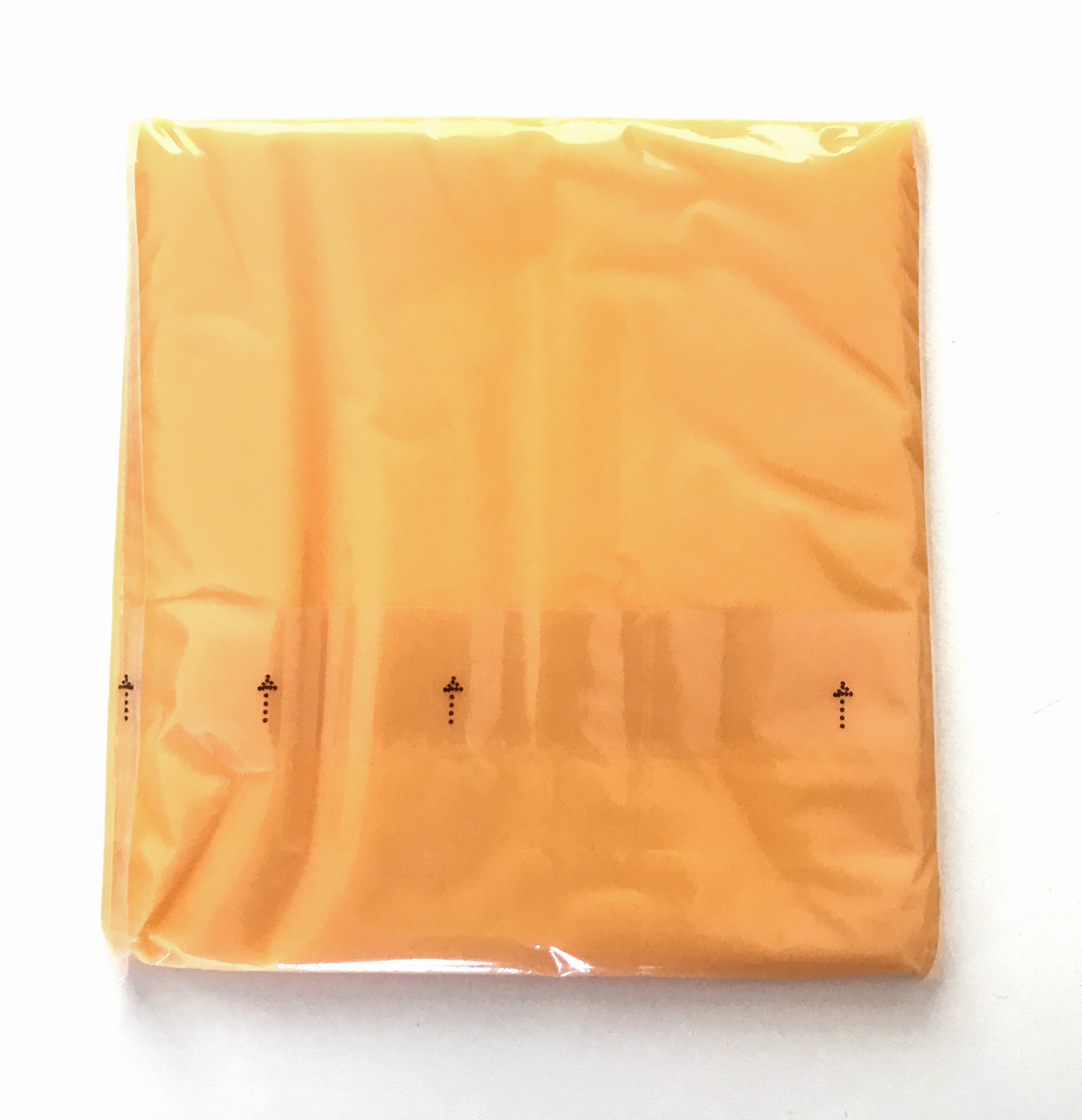
- American cheese is popularly single-wrapped
- Country of origin: United States
- Source of milk: Cows' milk
- Pasteurized: Yes

American cheese is a type of processed cheese made from cheddar, Colby, or similar cheeses, in conjunction with sodium citrate, which permits the cheese to be pasteurized without its components separating. It is mild with a creamy texture and salty flavor, has a medium-firm consistency, and has a low melting point. It is typically yellow or white in color; yellow American cheese is seasoned and colored with annatto.

Processed American cheese was invented in the 1910s by James L. Kraft, the founder of Kraft Foods Inc., who obtained a patent for his manufacturing process in 1916.

== History ==
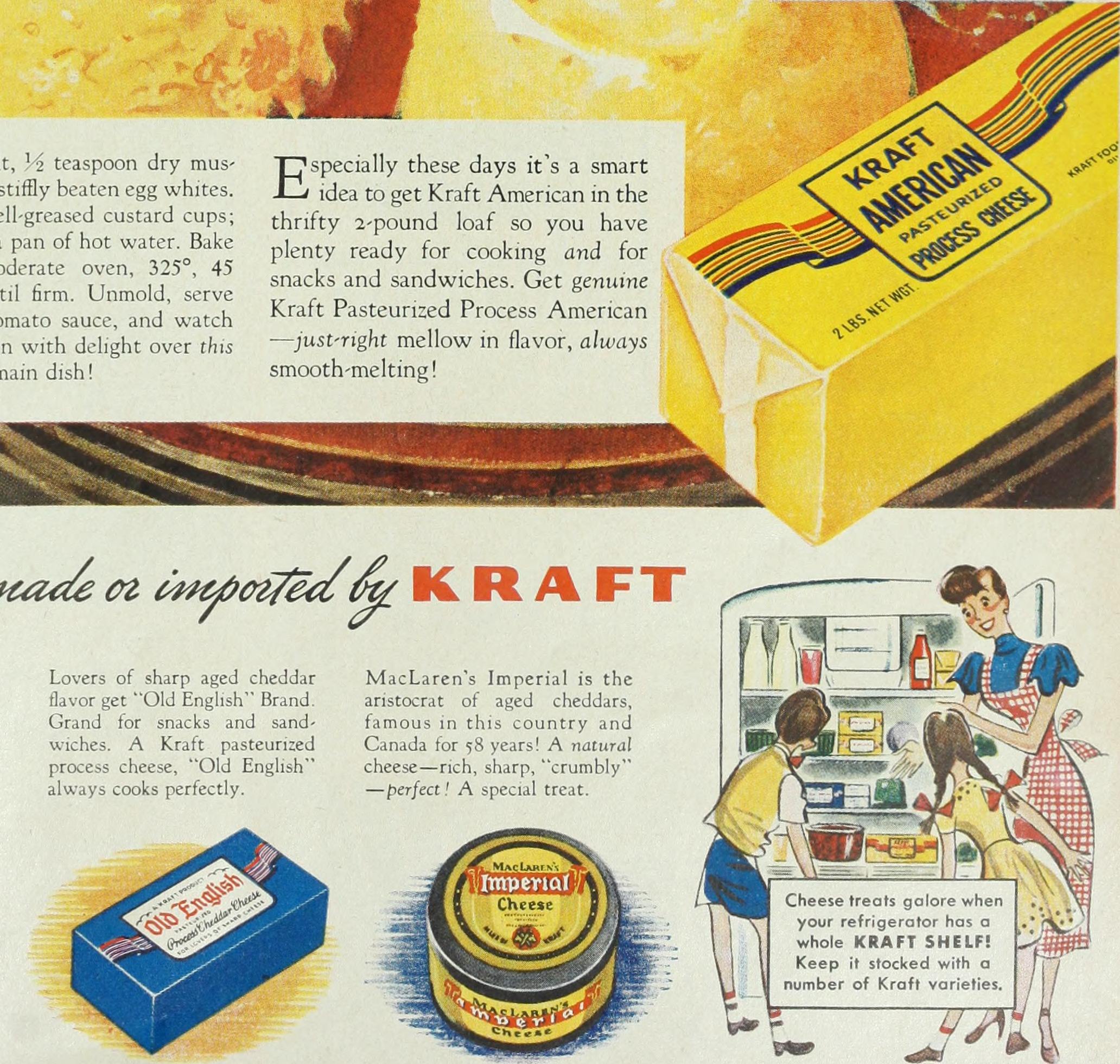
1948 advertisement for Kraft American Pasteurized Process Cheese, which came in a 2-pound (0.91 kg) block

British colonists brought cheddar cheese to North America and started producing it there soon after their arrival. By 1790, American-made cheddars were being exported back to England. What was known in America as yellow cheese or store cheese was known as American cheddar or Yankee cheddar in England. The Oxford English Dictionary lists the first known usage of "American cheese" as occurring in the Frankfort, Kentucky, newspaper The Guardian of Freedom in 1804.

After patenting a new method for manufacturing processed cheese in 1916, James L. Kraft began marketing it in the late 1910s. The term "American cheese" rapidly began to refer to the processed variety instead of the traditional but more expensive cheddars also made and sold in the U.S.

== Production ==
A mix of ingredients that must include at least 51% cheese (such as a traditionally made cheddar or Colby) is ground, combined with emulsifying agents and other ingredients that may total up to 49%, mixed and heated until it forms a melted homogeneous mixture. Sodium citrate is an important additive at this time, as it prevents the cheese fats from separating. The cheese mixture is then heated to a temperature of at least 150 °F (66 °C) for a minimum of 30 seconds during pasteurization.

Composition requirements of processed American cheese control the percentage of milkfat, moisture, salt and pH value in the final product, along with specifications for flavor, body and texture, color, and meltability.

Processed American cheese is variously packaged in individually wrapped slices, as unwrapped slices sold in stacks, or in unsliced blocks.

== Uses ==
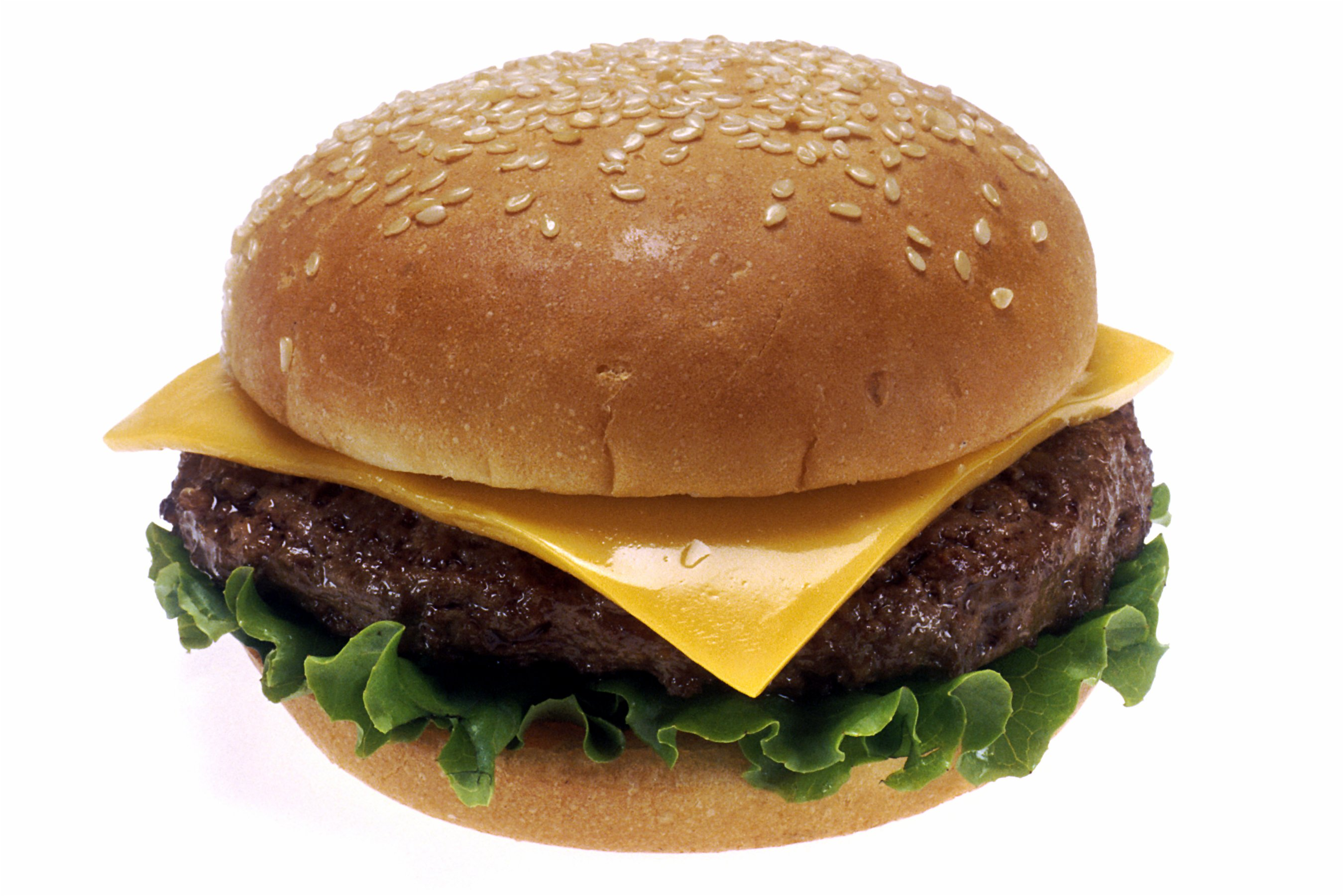
A cheeseburger is often topped with American cheese, a popular choice in North America

American cheese is a common choice for sandwiches in North America because of its neutral flavor and soft texture, pairing with a variety of meats and other ingredients.

American cheese is also recognized for its smooth and meltable texture, making it a reliable constituent in many dishes such as the grilled cheese sandwich, macaroni and cheese, and breakfast meals, including omelets, scrambled eggs, and breakfast sandwiches.

American cheese is used in the typical American cheeseburger, is ubiquitous in fast food, and is also used as an ingredient for related items such as cheese dogs, cheesesteaks, chili-cheese fries, and nachos.

Although the Philadelphia cheesesteak was originally made with provolone, white American cheese slices have migrated in their place in many foodstands; as of 2018, the Philadelphia/South Jersey market was responsible for 50% of Kraft Foods' white American cheese sales.

== Regulation ==
According to the Standards of Identity for Dairy Products, part of the U.S. Code of Federal Regulations (CFR), to be labeled "American cheese" a processed cheese is required to be manufactured from cheddar cheese, Colby cheese, washed curd cheese, or granular cheese, or any mixture of two or more of these. The CFR also includes regulations for the manufacturing of processed American cheese.

Because its manufacturing process differs from traditional cheeses, federal laws mandate that it be labeled as "pasteurized process American cheese" if made from more than one cheese. A "pasteurized process American cheese" must be entirely cheese with the exception of an emulsifying agent, salt, coloring, acidifying agents, and optional dairy fat sources (but at no more than 5% of the total weight). A "pasteurized process American cheese food" label is used if it is at least 51% cheese but other specific dairy ingredients such as cream, milk, skim milk, buttermilk, cheese whey, or albumin from cheese whey are added. Products with other added ingredients, such as Kraft Singles that contain milk protein concentrate, use legally unregulated terms such as "pasteurized prepared cheese product".

== See also ==
- Cold pack cheese
- Government cheese
- List of cheeses
- List of dairy products
