= Processed cheese =

Food product

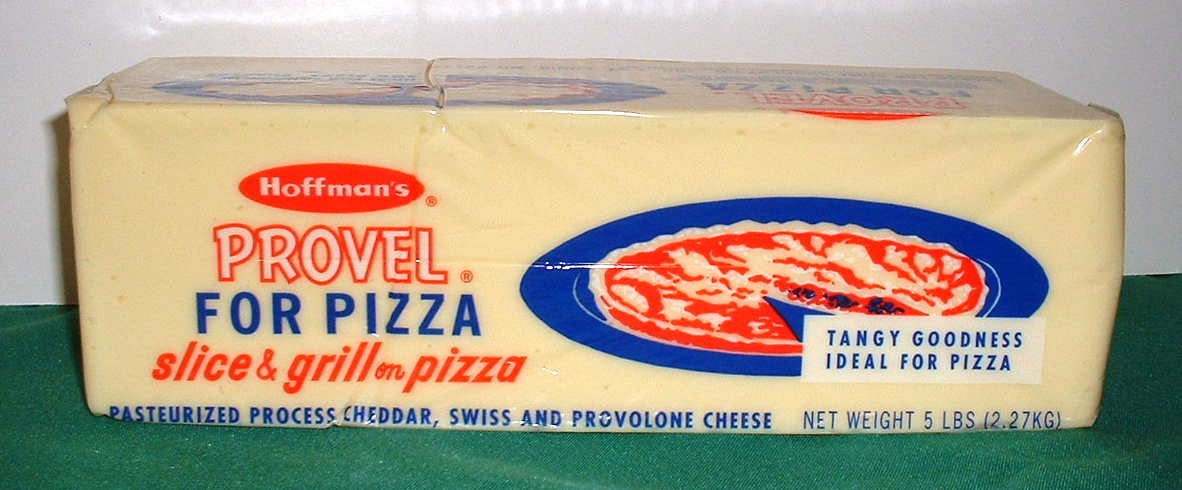
A 5-pound block of Provel "pasteurized process cheddar, swiss, and provolone cheese"

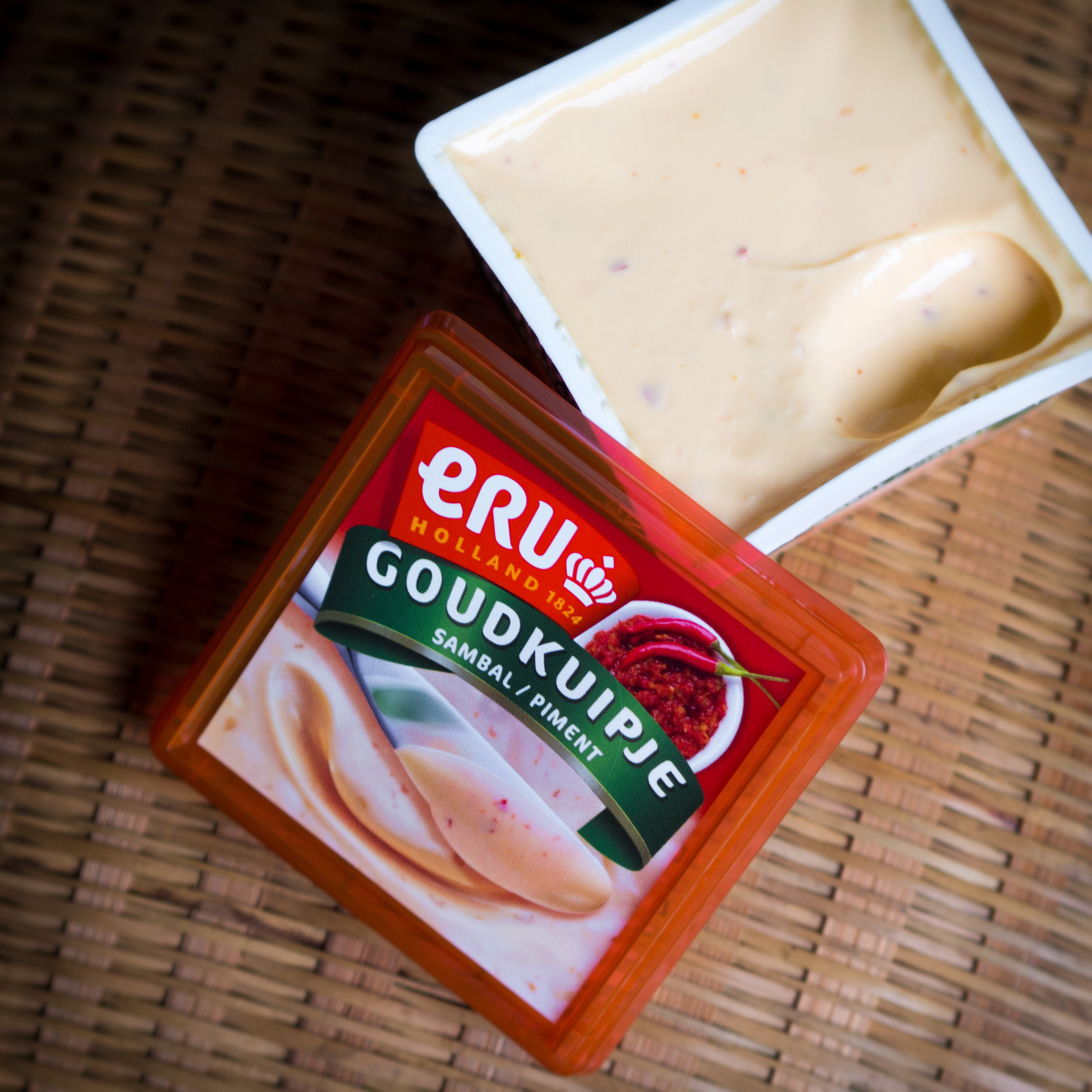
Cheese spreads, such as this one from the Netherlands, may be considered processed cheese in the broad sense.

Processed cheese (also known as process cheese; related terms include cheese food, prepared cheese, cheese product, and government cheese) is a product made from cheese mixed with an emulsifying agent (actually a calcium chelator). Additional ingredients, such as unfermented dairy ingredients, salt, vegetable oils, sugar, or food coloring may be included. As a result, many flavors, colors, and textures of processed cheese exist. Processed cheese typically contains around 50–60% cheese and 40–50% other ingredients.

== History ==
Processed cheese was first developed in Switzerland in 1911, when Walter Gerber and Fritz Stettler, seeking a cheese with longer shelf life and influenced by fondue and cheese sauces, added sodium citrate to melted Emmentaler cheese and found that the emulsified cheese sauce could be re-cooled into a solid again. Shortly after, in 1916, Canadian-American businessman James L. Kraft applied for the first U.S. patent covering a new method of storing cheese, which halts the maturation process by sterilization.

== Advantages ==
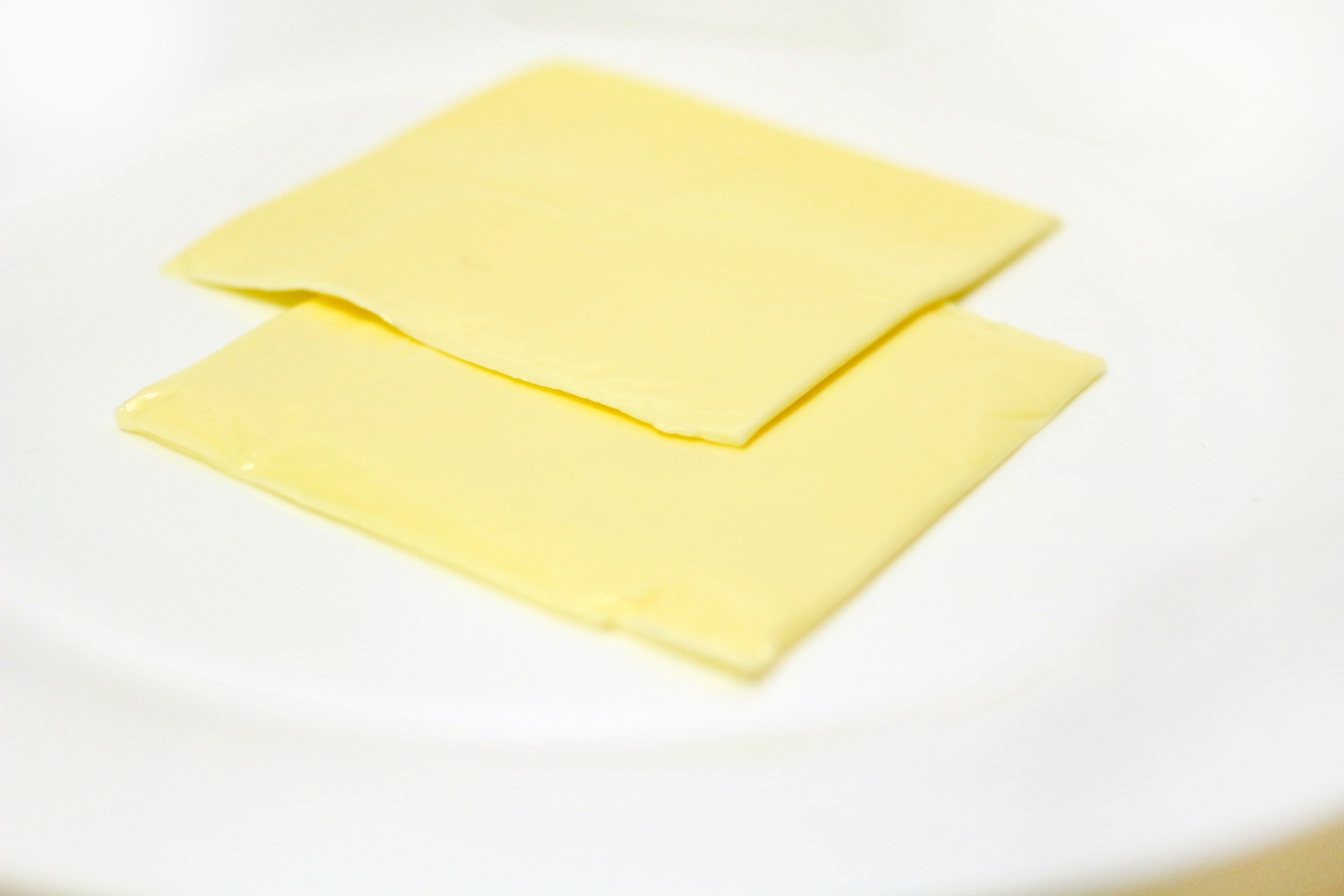
Slices of processed cheese

Processed cheese has several technical advantages over natural cheese, including a far longer shelf life, resistance to separating when cooked (meltability), and a uniform look and physical behavior. Its mass-produced nature also provides a dramatically lower cost than conventional cheesemaking, and enables industrial-scale production volumes, lower distribution costs, a steadier supply, and much faster production time compared to traditional cheeses.

Because processed cheese does not separate when melted, it is used as an ingredient in a variety of dishes. Unlike some unprocessed cheeses, heating does not alter its taste or texture.

== Chemistry ==
Processed cheese is made with the goal of being meltable without the fat separating from the protein. A traditional cheese consists of individual fat globules trapped in a network of casein, with calcium holding the casein molecules together. With prolonged heating, the typical result is a lumpy combination of protein gel and liquid fat on top. Processed cheese adds a calcium-sequestering agent (often mistakenly called an "emulsifier", though "emulsifying salt" and "emulsifying agent" are valid descriptions) to stop calcium from being able to hold this casein network together. Smaller groups of linked casein molecules are then able to better mix into the fat when melted, forming microscopic droplets instead of large lumps. Common calcium-sequestering agents include sodium phosphate, potassium phosphate, tartrate, and citrate. (Tartaric acid found in wine is the calcium-sequestering agent used in Swiss fondue.)

The longer shelf-life of processed cheese is not directly because of the emulsifying agent, but because it allows existing heat-based sterilization methods, such as canning, to be applied to the cheese without forming lumps.

== Sale and labeling ==
Processed cheese is often sold in blocks and packs of individual slices, often separated by wax paper, or with each slice individually wrapped by machine. Processed cheese was initially sold in unpressurized cans; some is still sold this way.

=== United Kingdom ===
In the United Kingdom, processed cheese can be sold in individually wrapped slices, these are often referred to as "American cheese" (irrespective of the origin or style of the cheese), or as "singles" (in reference to Kraft singles, despite the branded product not being typically available in the UK).

On the other hand, spreadable cheeses tend to be sold in tubs, pots, or wedges. Sometimes, adjectives like "cheesy" are used in the name of "singles" to circumvent laws regarding what can be referred to as cheese. Dairylea and The Laughing Cow are leading brands.

=== United States ===
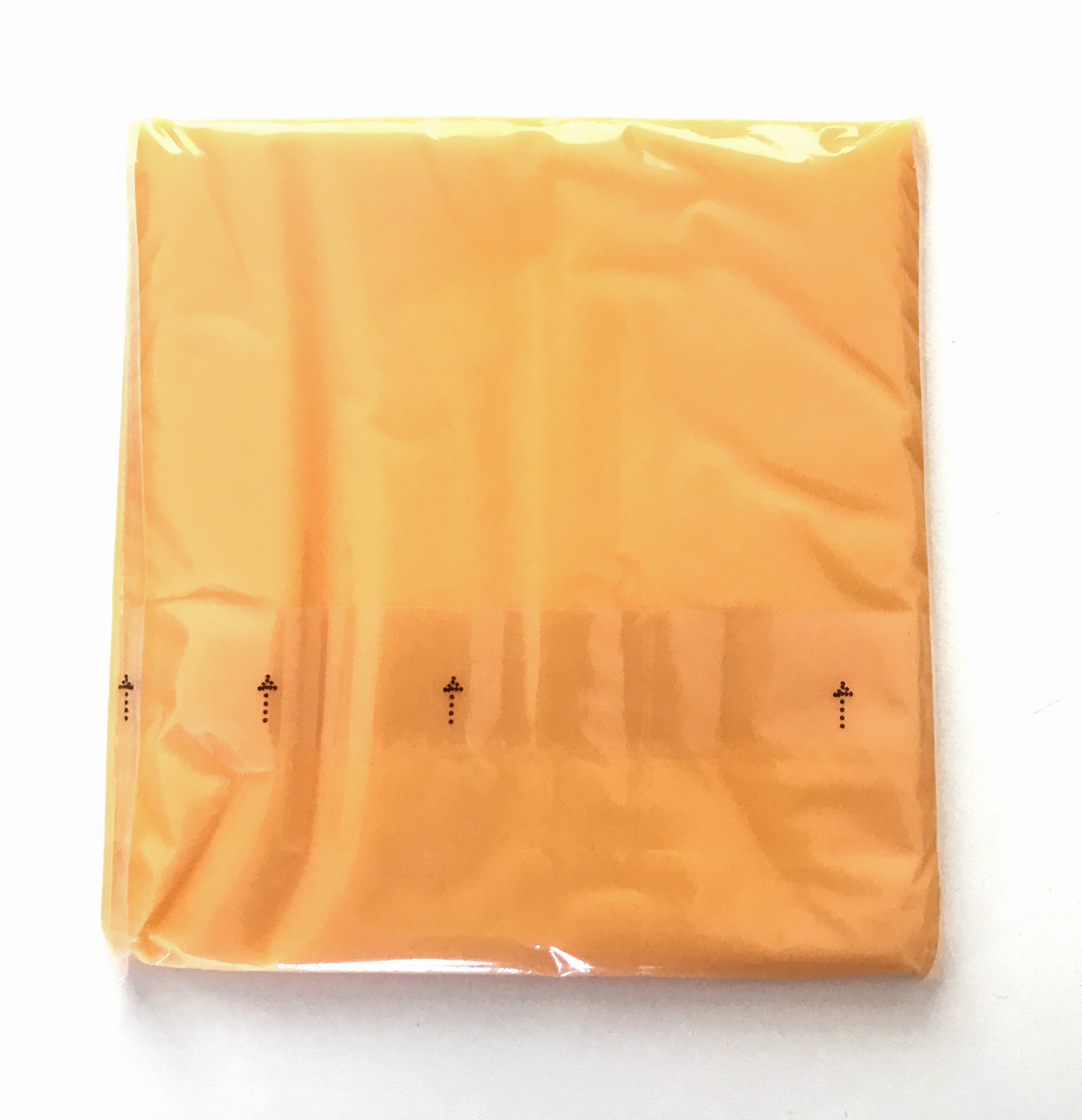
American cheese is a processed cheese. Pictured here in a single wrapped slice.

In 1916, Canadian-American James L. Kraft applied for the first U.S. patent for a method of making processed cheese. Kraft Foods Inc. developed the first commercially available, shelf-stable, sliced processed cheese; it was introduced in 1950. The first commercially available individually wrapped cheese slices were introduced in the US by Clearfield Cheese Co. in 1956. These forms of processed cheese have become ubiquitous in U.S. households ever since, most notably used for cheeseburgers and grilled cheese sandwiches because of its ability to cook evenly, distribute/stretch smoothly, and resist congealing, unlike traditional cheddar cheeses. Competitors lobbied unsuccessfully to require processed cheese be labeled "embalmed cheese".

The best known processed cheese in the United States is marketed as American cheese by Kraft Foods, (Note: Current Kraft Singles do not qualify as "process cheese" legally; see § Legal definitions below.) Borden, and other companies. It is yellow or off-white, mild, has a medium consistency and melts easily. It is typically made from a blend of cheeses, most often Colby and cheddar. Another type of processed cheese created in the United States is Provel pizza cheese, which uses cheddar, Swiss, and provolone cheeses. Provel cheese is commonly used in St. Louis-style pizza.

== Legal definitions ==
The high proportion of additives in processed cheese and similar products (e.g. unfermented dairy products, emulsifiers, oils, salts, and colors) means that some products made in this way cannot legally be labeled as cheese in many countries, even though similar products containing a higher percentage of cheese can be.

In the United States, the term "processed cheese" refers to products with the highest cheese content, made from cheese, up to 5% milkfat, and other allowed additives. Terms such as "cheese food" or "cheese spread" refer to products with lower amounts of cheese. "Cheese product" is an unregulated term used by some manufacturers for products that do not meet any of the standards.

=== United States ===
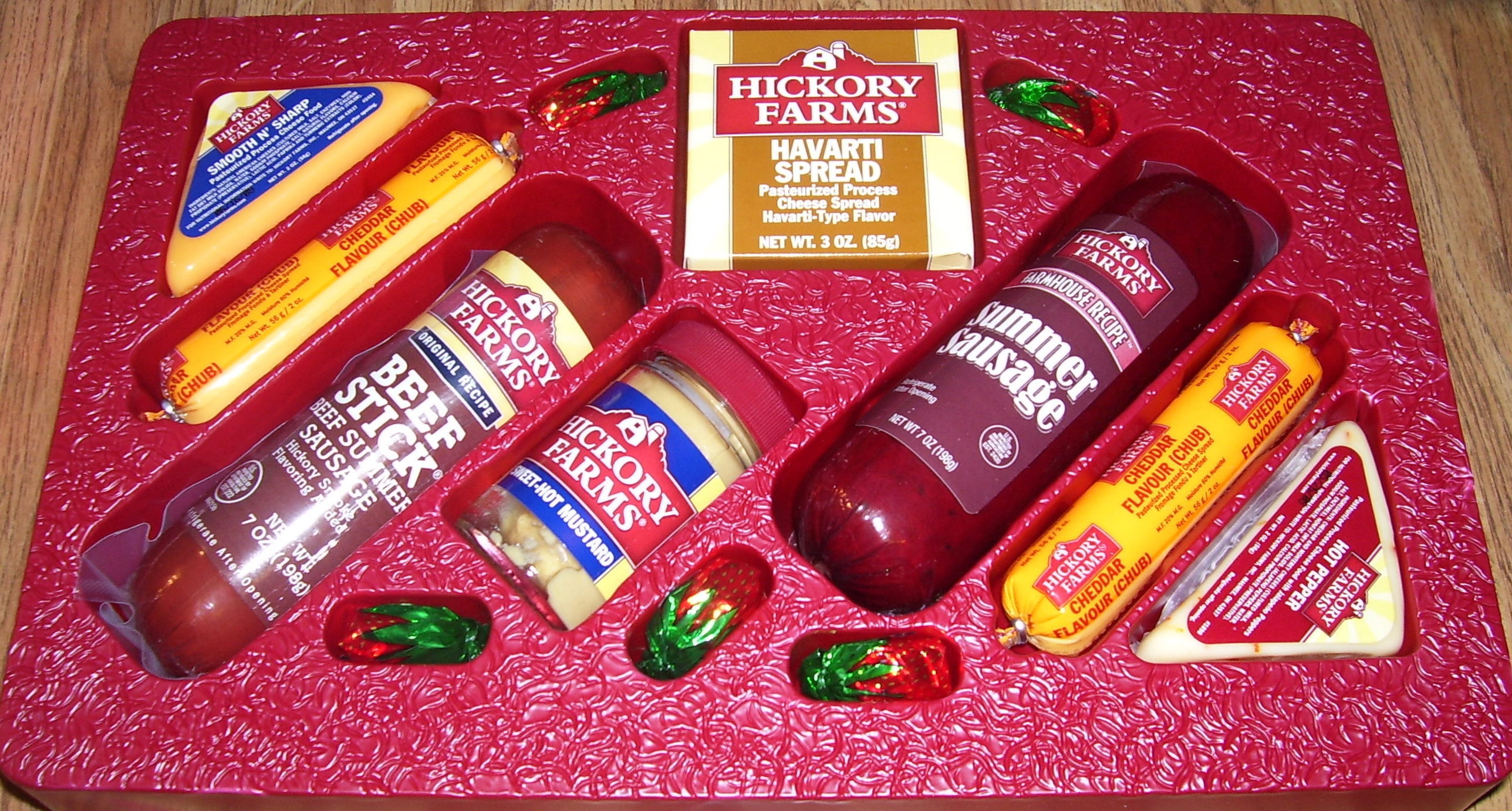
A gift pack containing several varieties of labeled process cheese. Upper left: a "pasteurized process cheese food" and a "pasteurized processed cheese spread" Upper center: a "pasteurized process cheese spread Havarti-type flavor" Lowermost right: a "pasteurized process cheese food with jalapeño peppers"

In the United States, processed cheese is defined, categorized, and regulated by the Food and Drug Administration (FDA) under the U.S. Code of Federal Regulations Title 21, Section 133 ("Cheeses and Cheese-Related Products"). Three of the main classes are:

Pasteurized process cheese (§133.169)
PPC is a product made from one or more cheeses (excluding certain cheeses such as cream cheese and cottage cheese, but including American cheese), (Note: Under the U.S. Code of Federal Regulations Title 21, Article 133, Section 169 (Pasteurized process cheese), the allowed usage of the term "American Cheese" for certain types of "Pasteurized process cheese" is detailed. Specifically, in paragraph (e)(2)(ii) of section 133.169, it states, "In case it is made of cheddar cheese, washed curd cheese, colby cheese, or granular cheese or any mixture of two or more of these, it may be designated 'Pasteurized process American cheese'; or when cheddar cheese, washed curd cheese, colby cheese, granular cheese, or any mixture of two or more of these is combined with other varieties of cheese in the cheese ingredient, any of such cheeses or such mixture may be designated as 'American cheese'.") mixed with emusifying salts.
Acceptable additives include acidifying agents, source of milkfat (cream, anhydrous milkfat, dehydrated cream), water, salt, artificial color, spices or flavorings (other than those simulating the flavor of cheese), and enzyme-modified cheese. PPC in consumer-sized packages can also include mold inhibitor and lecithin. Added milk fat must not exceed 5% by weight.
In the final product, moisture must not be more than 41 percent of the weight, and fat content not less than 49 percent. The moisture and fat contents must also fall into the acceptable range for its source cheese(s).
Pasteurized process cheese food (§133.173)
PPCF is made from one or more of the cheeses available for pasteurized process cheese composing not less than 51 percent of the final weight, mixed with one or more optional dairy ingredients such as cream, fluid milk, or whey.
Acceptable additives include emulsifying salts, acidifying agents, water, salt, artificial color, spices or flavorings (other than those simulating the flavor of cheese), and enzyme-modified cheese. PPCF in consumer-sized packages can also include mold inhibitor and lecithin.
The final solid form must be less than 44 percent moisture and have a fat content greater than 23 percent.
Pasteurized process cheese spread (§133.179)
PPCS is made similarly to pasteurized process cheese food but must be spreadable at 70 °F (21 °C). Moisture must be between 44 and 60 percent of the total weight, and fat content greater than 20 percent. Nisin may be added.

==== Use of unregulated terms ====
The FDA does not maintain a standard of identity for either "pasteurized prepared cheese product", a designation which particularly appears on many Kraft products, or "pasteurized process cheese product", a designation which appears particularly on many American store- and generic-branded singles. Since by using undefined terms the manufacturers technically avoid being accused of false labeling, products carrying such labels are free to use milk protein concentrate (MPC) in their formulations, an ingredient the FDA does not permit in processed cheese. The desire to use inexpensive imported milk protein concentrate to replace some of the cheese in their products is noted as motivation for the manufacturers to introduce these and similar terms, and for the relabeling of some products. After an FDA Warning Letter protesting Kraft's use of MPC in late 2002, some varieties of Kraft Singles formerly labeled "pasteurized process cheese food" became "pasteurized prepared cheese product", Velveeta was relabeled from "pasteurized process cheese spread" to "pasteurized prepared cheese product", and Easy Cheese from "pasteurized process cheese spread" to "pasteurized cheese snack".

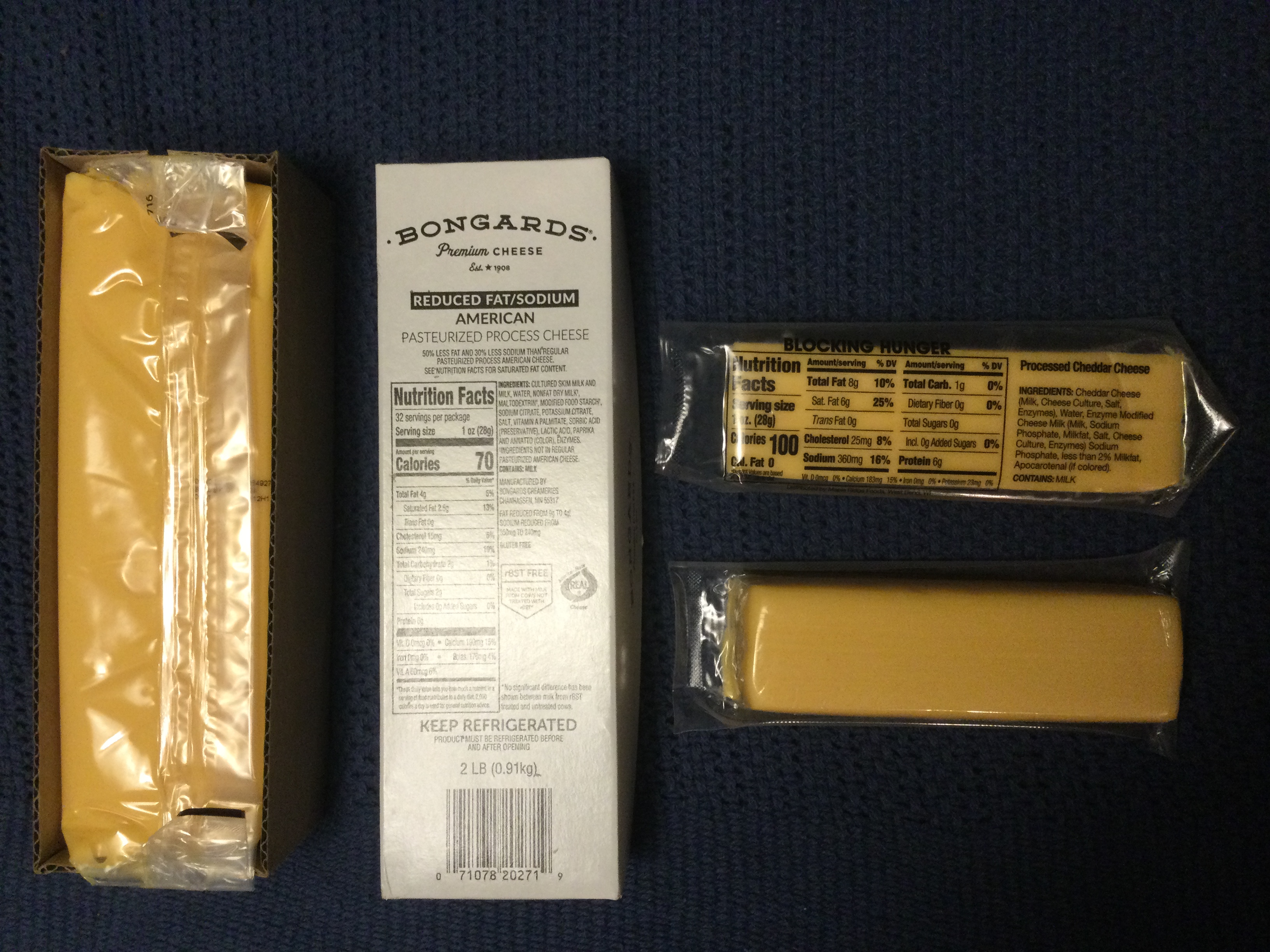
Government cheese from 2023: a large chunk of American pasteurized process cheese and a small chunk of processed Cheddar cheese

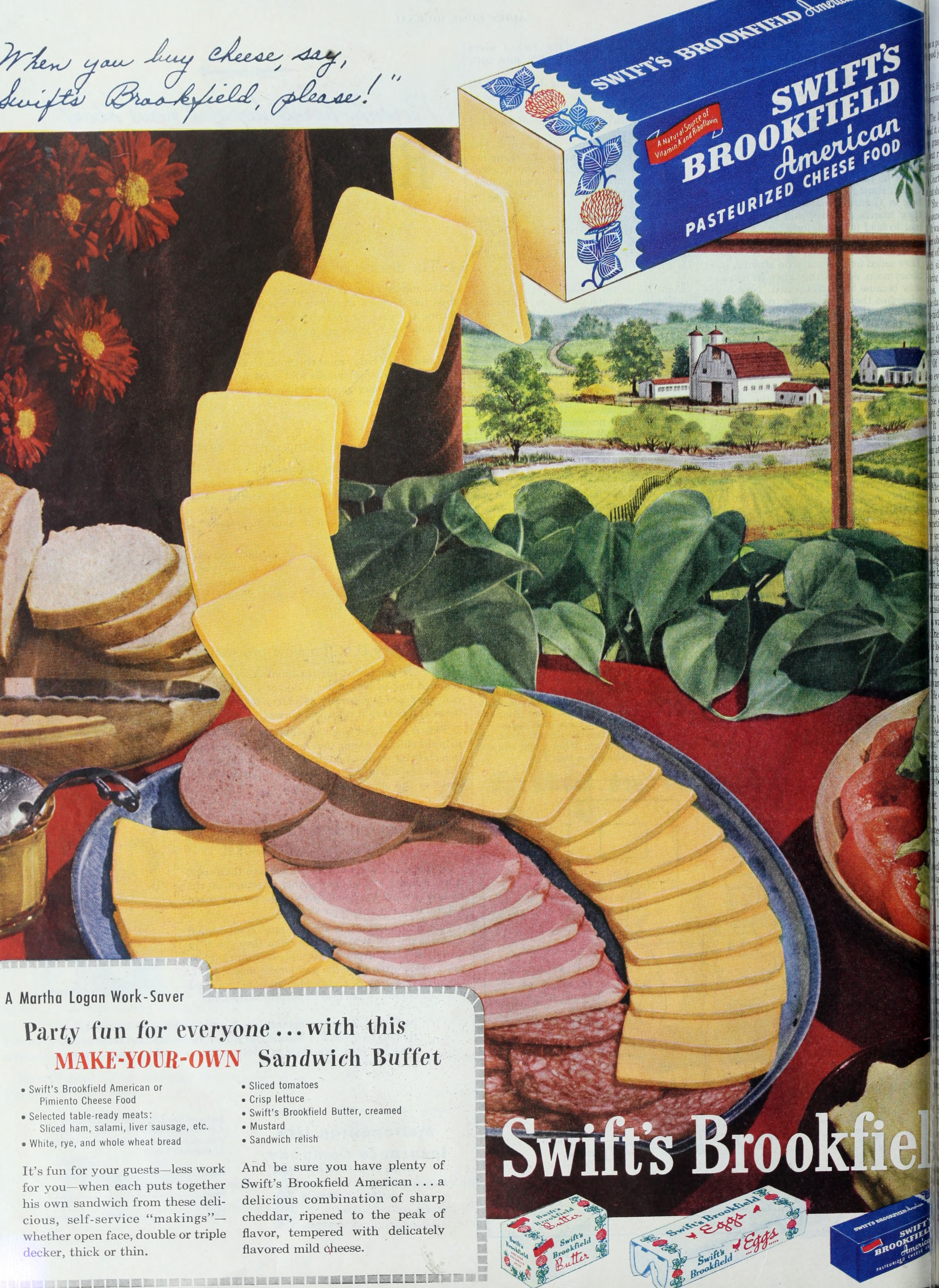
A 1948 U.S. advertisement for an American pasteurized cheese food

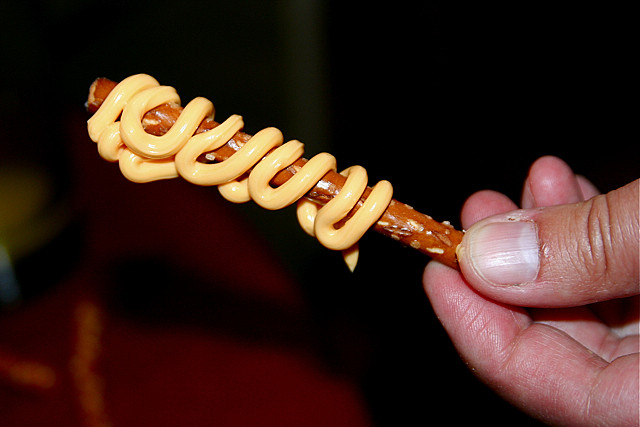
Easy Cheese, a "pasteurized process cheese snack" (unregulated term), on a pretzel

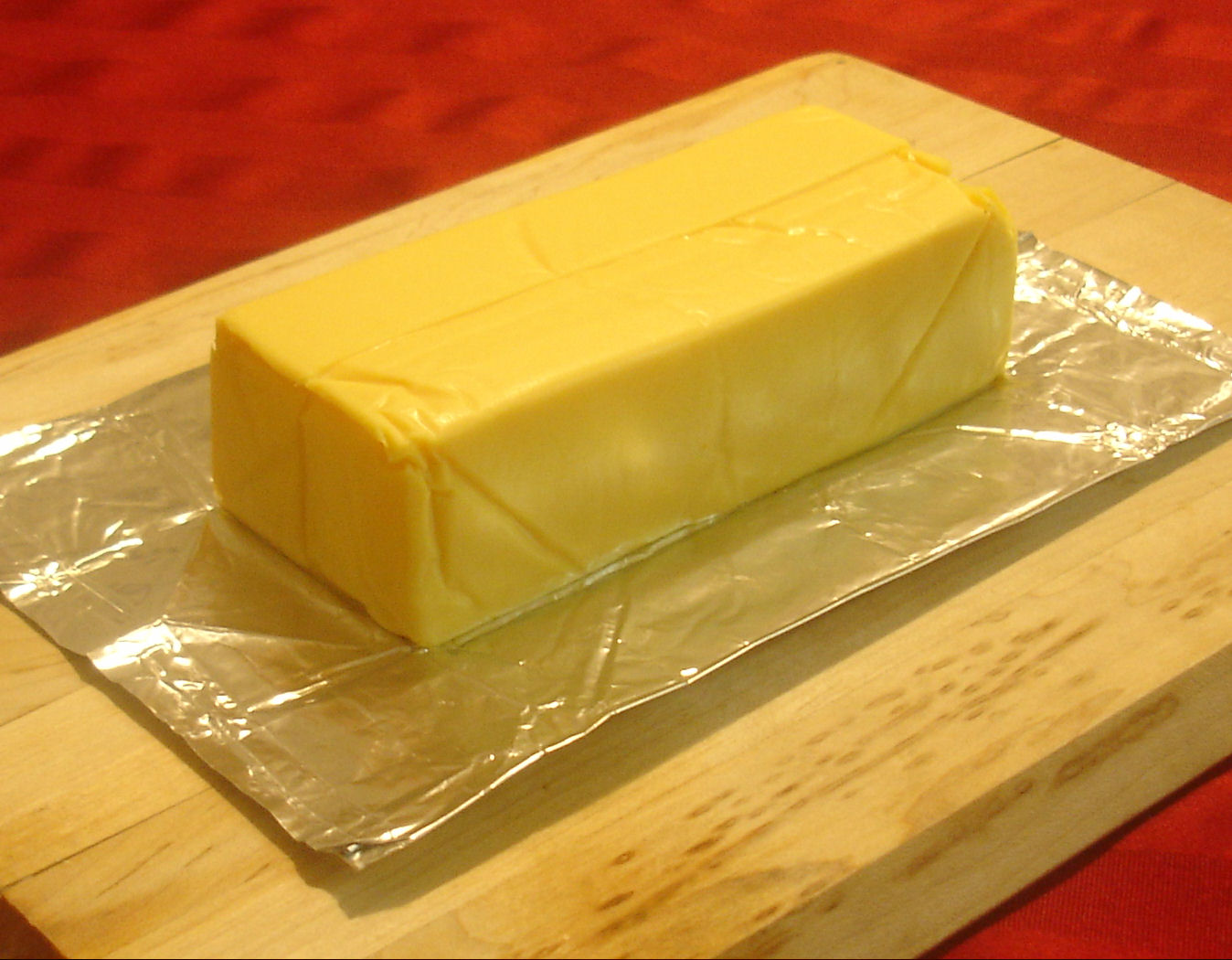
Velveeta, a "pasteurized prepared cheese product" (unregulated term)

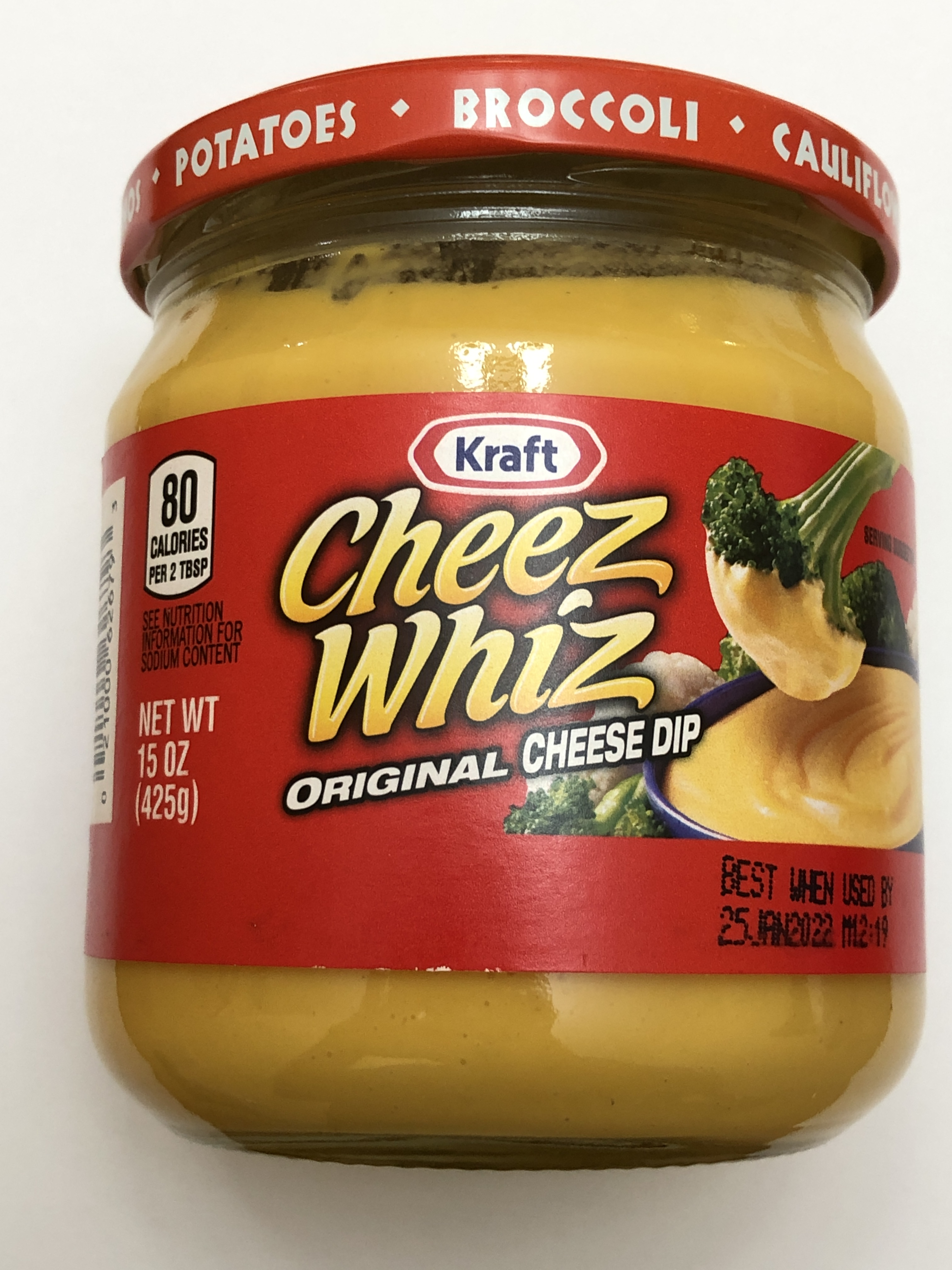
Cheez Whiz, a "cheese dip" (unregulated term) commonly used for cheesesteaks

== See also ==
- Cheese sauce
