= Kraft Singles =

Processed cheese product

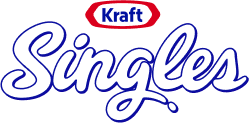

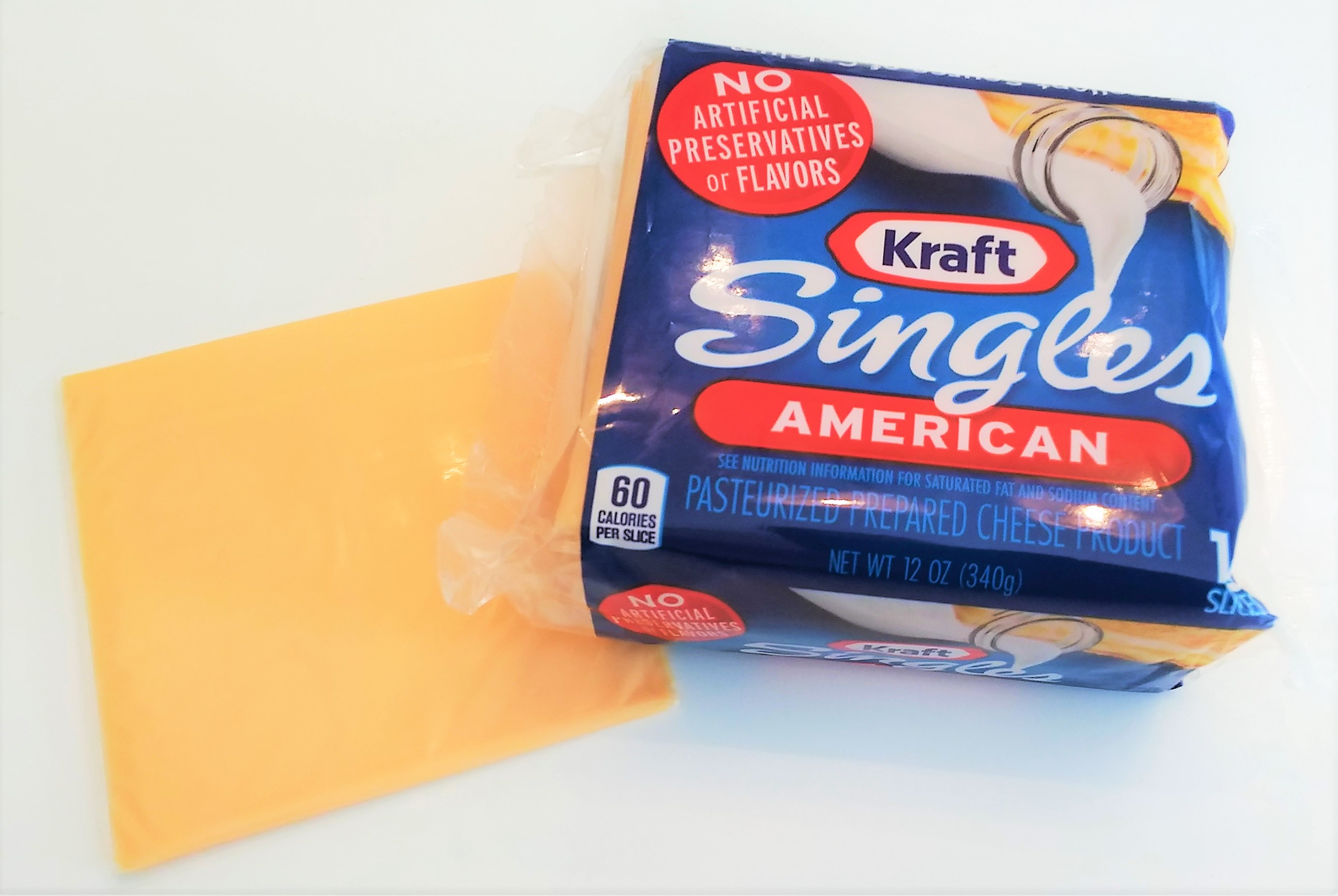
- Current owner: Kraft Heinz
- Country: United States
- Introduced: 1950; 76 years ago
- Markets: Worldwide
- Website: www.kraftheinz.com/kraft-singles

Kraft Singles
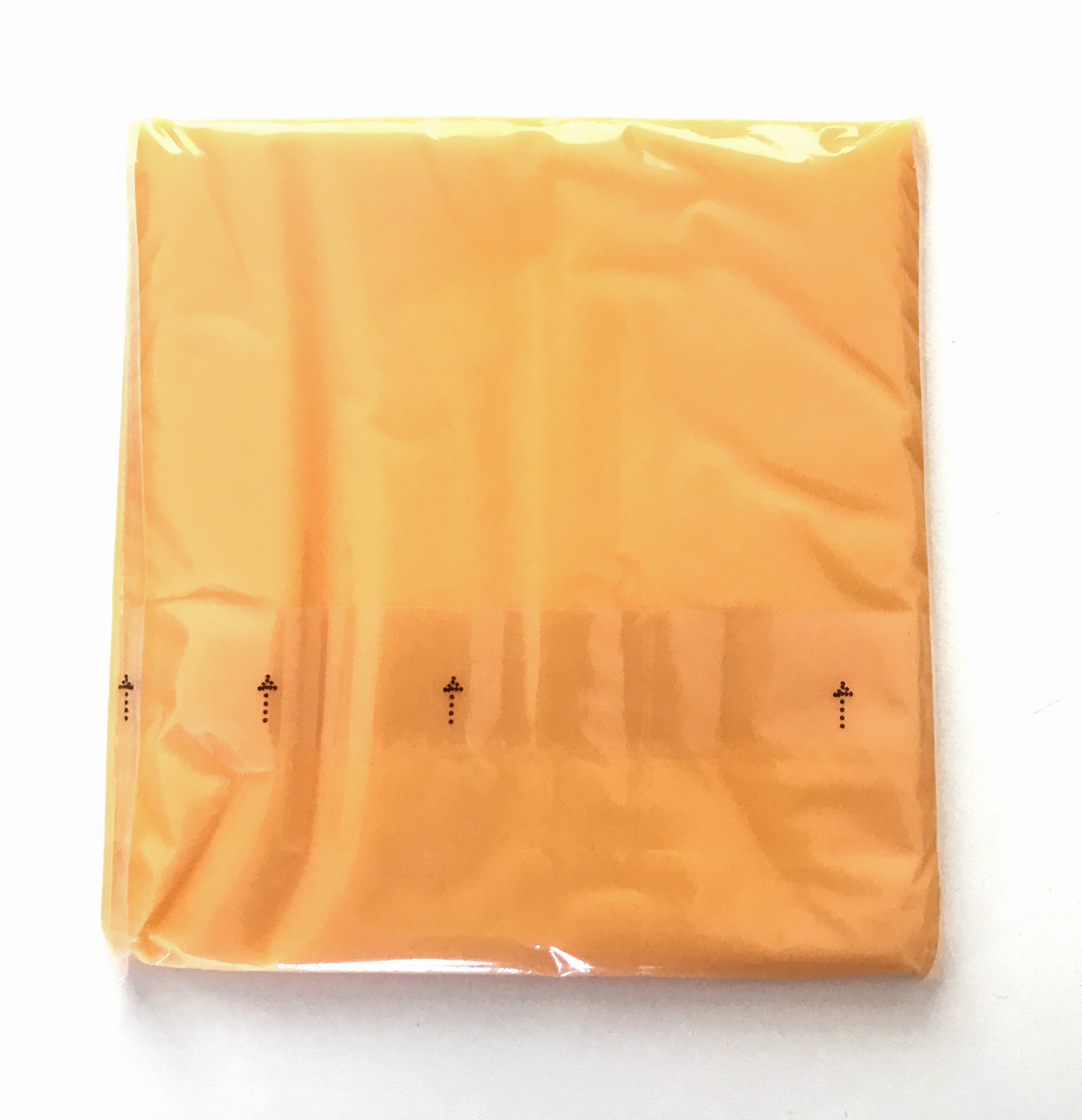
- Type: Pasteurized prepared cheese product
- Food energy (per 21 g serving): 60 kcal (250 kJ)
Nutritional value
(per 21 g serving)
- Protein: 4 g
- Fat: 4 g
- Carbohydrate: 2 g

Kraft Singles is a processed cheese product manufactured and sold by Kraft Heinz. Introduced in 1950, the individually wrapped "slices" are not really slices off a block, but formed separately in manufacturing.

They do not qualify for the "Pasteurized Process Cheese" labeling, as the percentage of milkfat in the product that comes from the added dairy ingredients is greater than 5%. Kraft had used label "Pasteurized Process Cheese Food", which allows for a greater percentage of added dairy, until the FDA gave a warning in December 2002 stating that Kraft could not legally use that label any longer due to a formulation change that replaced some of the non-fat milk in the recipe with milk protein concentrate, which is not a permitted additive. Kraft complied with the FDA order by changing the label to the current "Pasteurized Prepared Cheese Product". Kraft Singles contain no vegetable oil or other non-dairy fats.

One of the more famous ad campaigns involved the claim that each 3/4-ounce (21 g) slice contained "five ounces [140 g] of milk", which makes them taste better than imitation cheese slices made mostly with vegetable oil and water and hardly any milk. The campaign was criticized for its implications that each slice contained the same amount of calcium as a five-US-fluid-ounce (150 ml) glass of milk and also more calcium than imitation cheese slices, which eventually led to a ruling by the Federal Trade Commission in 1992 that ordered Kraft to stop making the misrepresentations in its advertising.

In Australia, the Kraft branding was retired in 2017. Kraft's successor company in Australia, Mondelez, sold their cheese products line to Bega Cheese, but retained rights to the Kraft name. Bega switched the name of their sliced cheese product from "Kraft Singles" to "Dairylea Slices", as Bega acquired the rights to the Dairylea brand in Australia in the deal.

As of 2019, though around 40 percent of households in the United States continue to buy Kraft Singles, sales have been flat.

== History ==
Kraft Singles were introduced in 1950 as "Kraft De Luxe Process Slices". Initially, they were not wrapped individually; Arnold Nawrocki, an American engineer, developed a machine which did this in August 1956. Although Kraft Foods eventually became synonymous with individually wrapped cheese slices, it was Arnold N. Nawrocki and the Clearfield Cheese Company that revolutionized its packaging and marketing. Kraft did not introduce individually wrapped cheese slices as a product until 1965.

In 2023, Kraft updated their packaging for the Kraft Singles, featuring updated branding design along with an easier-to-open wrapper. In January 2024, Kraft introduced three new flavors of Kraft Singles: Caramelized Onion, Jalapeño, and Garlic & Herb.
