= Enzyme-modified cheese =

Flavorant food additive

Enzyme-modified cheese (EMC) is a concentrated cheese flavour ingredient that is produced from cheese (or its upstream ingredients) by treatment with enzymes such as proteases (not including the usual rennet), lipases and esterases. An incubation period under controlled conditions is required for proper flavor development. These enzymes accelerate and intensify the ripening of cheese, which is normally done with enzymes released by a microbial culture. They may be added to during cheesemaking, after the cheese curds have been pressed, or even after the cheese has been naturally aged. EMCs were first made in the 1970s.

== Uses ==
EMCs are used in powder or paste forms. They are generally added to foods at dosages of around 0.1-2% (up to 5%) to provide a cheesy flavour. They are usually 10-30 times as intense in flavour as natural cheeses, but have a different (much exaggerated) taste profile from the parent cheese. EMCs are used in processed cheese, cheese powders, cheese spreads, and salad dressings.

EMC in dry powder form typically have a longer shelf-life than paste EMC. They can also be used in more applications and are thus more popular as of 2021.

== Flavors ==
A number of EMC flavors are available via manipulation of the parent cheese, enzyme mixtures, or aging times. By 1986, flavors include mild, medium, and sharp Cheddar, as well as Colby, Swiss, Provolone, Romano, Mozzarella, Parmesan, and Brick. These flavors are developed by analyzing the flavoring compounds, such as amino acids and fatty acids, of the target cheese. Flavors have become even more diverse by the 2020s. Nature identical or artificial cheese flavours are chemically synthesized. However, as cheese flavour is a complex mixture of biochemically derived compounds it is difficult to chemically create a blend of synthesized compounds that mimic the natural flavour and aroma of cheese, particularly since such a diverse range of cheese flavours exist.

The flavor of an EMC depends on the curds and the enzyme composition. A cheddar-type EMC derives most of its lactate and acetate from the natural cheddar curd it is based on. Varying the amount of proteases and lipases tune the amount of background notes (amino acids, peptides) relative to sharp fatty acid flavors. Swiss cheese additionally require propionates, which comes from glycolysis.

== Production ==
EMC is usually made by un-matured cheese curd with additions of emulsified salt and water. Most EMCs are made in a one-stream process starting from a hard or semi-hard type cheese curd. Others may separately age the fat and the curd for better tuning of the proteolysis-to-lipolysis flavor ratio. Few EMC makes use of a starter culture, but Blue cheese flavor is an important exception. The blue mold Penicillium roqueforti is mixed into cream instead of curds (the ketone flavor is produced from fats). With constant aeration and stirring, the desired flavor develops in just 48 hours.

== Food standards ==
In the European Union, EMC is considered a flavouring preparation when used without other flavourings. In the United States, EMCs have generally recognized as safe status. The US standards of identity for cheese allows "enzymes used in curing or flavor development" for a number of styles of cheeses in addition to the usual "clotting enzymes" (rennet).
