= Cheese ripening =

Process in cheesemaking

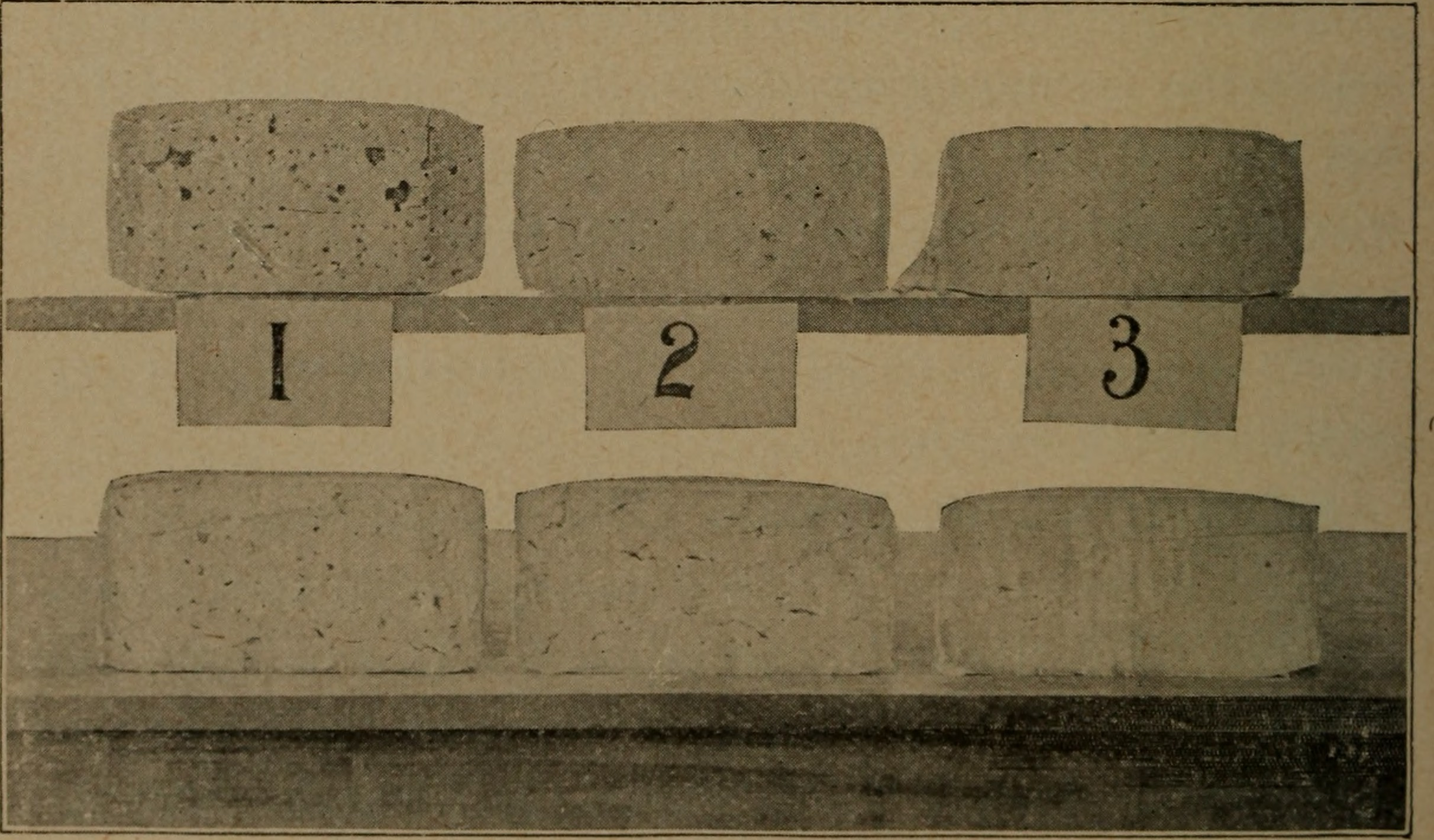
The effect of dairy salt in Cheddar cheese making: increased use of salt reduces moisture and slows the ripening process.

Cheese ripening, alternatively cheese maturation or affinage, is a process in cheesemaking. It is responsible for the distinct flavour of cheese, and through the modification of "ripening agents", determines the features that define many different varieties of cheeses, such as taste, texture, and body. The process is "characterized by a series of complex physical, chemical and microbiological changes" that incorporates the agents of "bacteria and enzymes of the milk, lactic culture, rennet, lipases, added moulds or yeasts, and environmental contaminants". The majority of cheese is ripened, except for fresh cheese.

== History ==
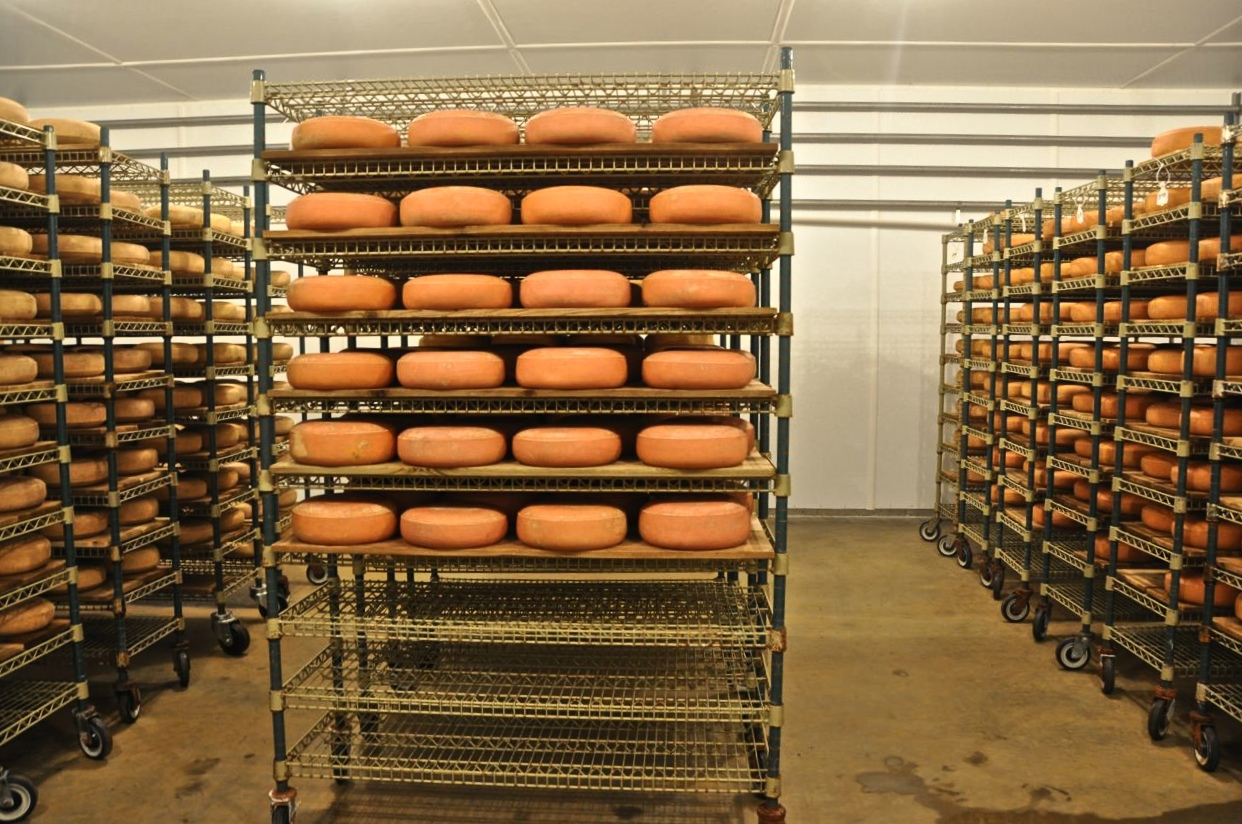
A cheese cave used to age cheeses

Cheese ripening was not always the highly industrialised process it is today; in the past, cellars and caves were used to ripen cheeses instead of the current highly regulated process involving machinery and biochemistry. Some cheeses still are made using more historical methods, such as the blue cheese Roquefort, which is required to be ripened in designated caves in south-western France.

With the invention of refrigeration in the 20th century, the process evolved considerably, and is much more efficient at producing a consistent quality of cheese, at a faster pace, and a lower cost (depending on the type of cheese).

== Process ==
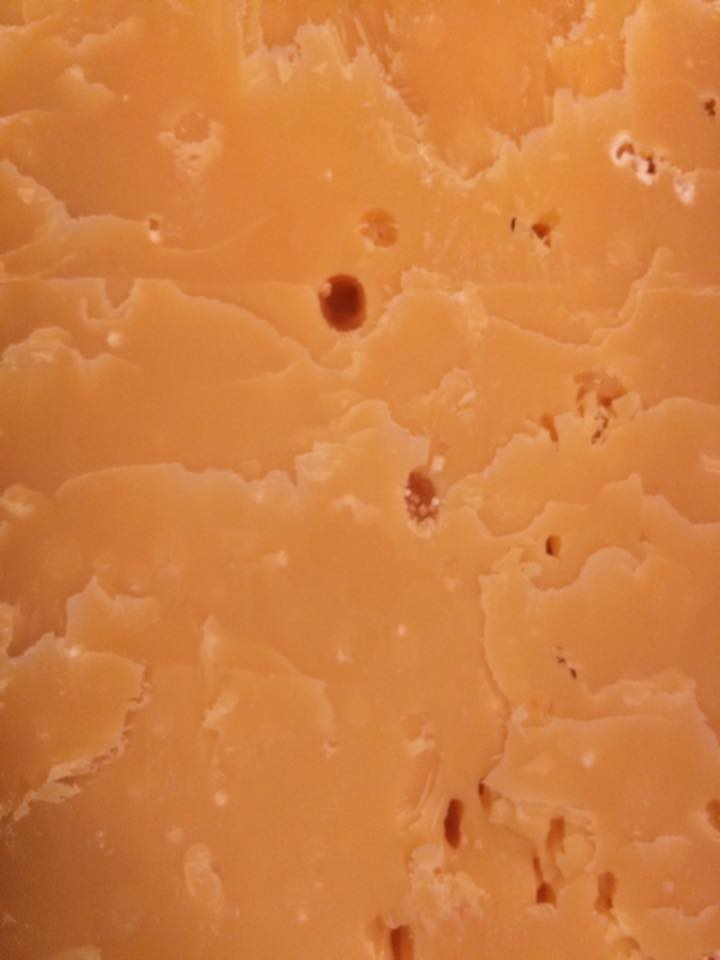
Extra aged Beemster cheese, 26+ months old, showing the tyrosine crystals.

After the initial manufacturing process of the cheese is done, the cheese ripening process occurs. This process is especially important, since it defines the flavour and texture of the cheese, which differentiates the many varieties. Duration is dependent on the type of cheese and the desired quality, and typically ranges from "three weeks to two or more years".

Ripening is influenced by a variety of factors, ranging from the microflora to the curd, and others. The enzymatic process is the most crucial process for all cheeses, although bacteria play a role in many varieties. The most important agents in this process include the following elements:

- Rennet, or a substitute for rennet
- starter bacteria and associated enzymes
- milk enzymes
- second starter bacteria and associated enzymes
- non-starter bacteria

Each of these factors affects the cheese-ripening process differently and has been the subject of much research. It is important for manufacturers to understand how each of these elements work, so that they are able to maintain the quality of the cheese while producing the cheese at an acceptable investment of time and cost. These agents contribute to the three primary reactions that define cheese ripening: glycolysis, proteolysis, and lipolysis.

By taking the cheese through a series of maturation stages where temperature and relative humidity are carefully controlled, the cheese maker allows the surface mould to grow and the mould ripening of the cheese by fungi to occur. Mould-ripened cheeses ripen faster than hard cheeses, in weeks as opposed to the typical months or even years. This is because the fungi used are more biochemically active than the starter bacteria. Where the ripening occurs is largely dependent on the type of cheese: some cheeses are surface ripened by moulds, such as Camembert and Brie; and some are ripened internally, such as Stilton. Surface ripening of some cheeses, such as Saint-Nectaire cheese, may also be influenced by yeasts which contribute flavour and coat texture. Others are allowed by the cheesemaker to develop bacterial surface growths which give characteristic colours and appearances. The growth of Brevibacterium linens, for example, creates an orange coat to cheeses.

In contrast to cheddaring, making cheeses like Camembert requires a gentler treatment of the curd. It is carefully transferred to cheese hoops and the whey is allowed to drain from the curd by gravity, generally overnight. The cheese curds are then removed from the hoops to be brined by immersion in a saturated salt solution. This is because the amount of salt has a large effect on the rate of proteolysis in the cheese, stopping the bacteria from growing. If white-mould spores have not been added to the cheese milk, the cheese maker applies them to the cheese either by spraying the cheese with a suspension of mould spores in water, or by immersing the cheese in a bath containing spores of, e.g., Penicillium candida.

Starting in the 1970s, chemical analysis of cheese flavor made it possible to replicate aspects of cheese ripening by added enzymes. This resulted in enzyme-modified cheese, a flavoring preparation providing exaggerated cheese flavors, produced in a fraction of the time.

== Effect on features ==
=== Eyes ===
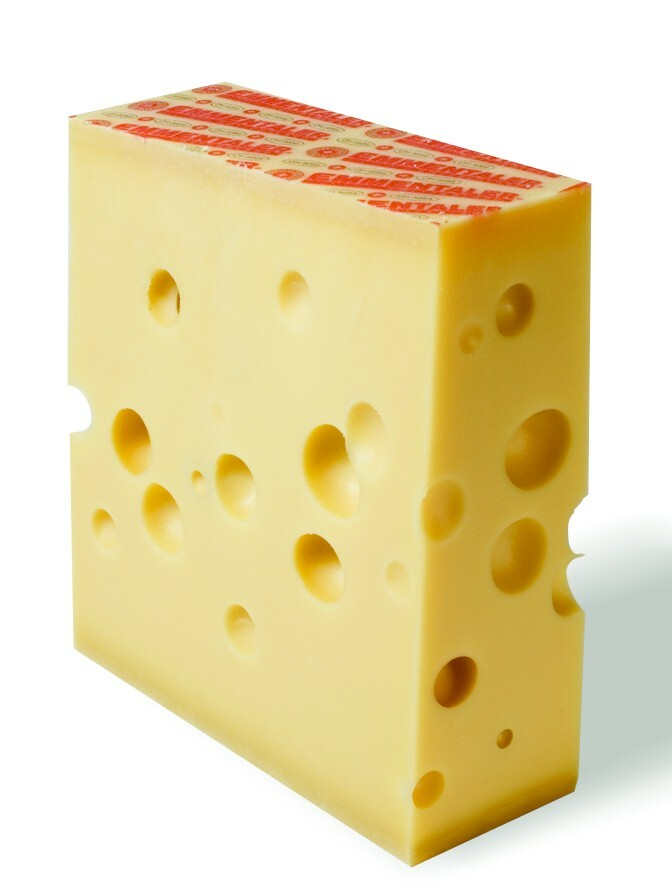
Emmental with eyes. Emmental tastes sweeter due to proline.

The round holes that are a characteristic feature of Swiss-type cheese (e.g. Emmentaler cheese) and some Dutch-type cheeses are called "eyes". They are bubbles of carbon dioxide that are produced by bacteria in the cheese.

In Swiss-type cheeses, the eyes form as a result of the activity of propionic acid bacteria (propionibacteria), notably Propionibacterium freudenreichii subsp. shermanii. In Dutch-type cheeses, the CO_{2} that forms the eyes results from the metabolisation of citrate by citrate-positive ("Cit+") strains of lactococci.

=== Taste ===
The process of cheese ripening affects the taste of the final product. If the product is not ripened, the resulting cheese is tasteless, and so all cheese is ripened except for fresh cheeses. Different factors define taste in cheese, including casein, fat, brine and many other elements. Brine, for example, mixes with saliva, delivering the flavour of the cheese to the taste buds and determining the cheese's moistness. Many of these elements are specific to the type of cheese. For instance, proline is more abundant in Emmental than in any other type of cheese and gives the cheese its much sweeter taste.

== See also ==
- List of cheeses
