= Pimento cheese =

Spread consisting of cheddar cheese, mayonnaise, and pimento peppers

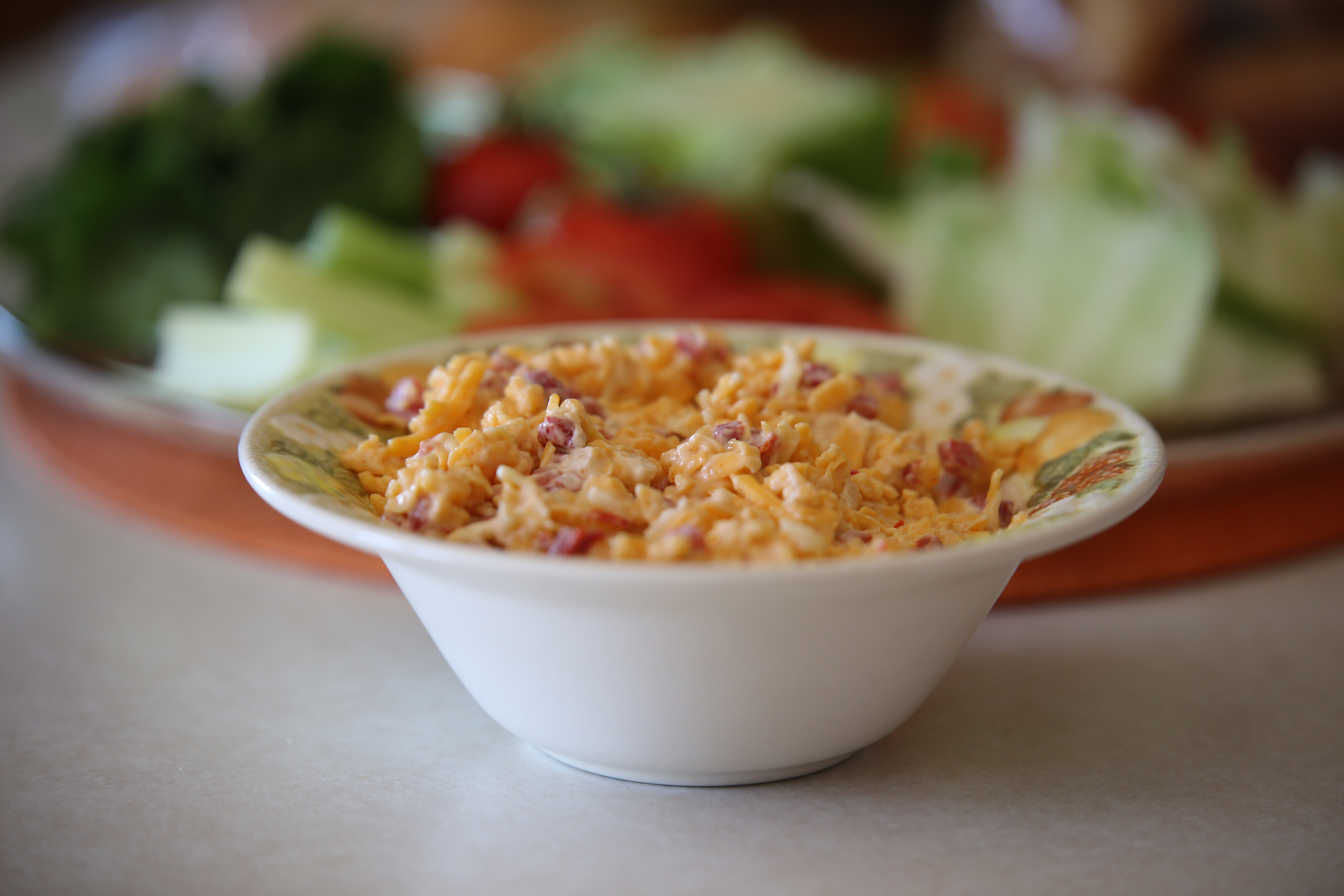
- Pimento cheese served in a bowl
- Type: Spread
- Place of origin: United States
- Main ingredients: Cheddar cheese or processed cheese, mayonnaise, pimentos

Pimento cheese (or pimiento cheese) is a spread typically made of cheese, mayonnaise, and pimentos and is typically served on crackers and vegetables or in sandwiches. There are ingredient variations among family recipe, commercial recipe, and regional versions.

Although the recipe has its origins in the Northern United States, it is generally most closely associated with the cuisine of the Southern United States.

== Origins and history ==
The dish has its origins in the Northern United States in the early 20th century as a homemade snack spread. A 1908 Good Housekeeping recipe called for soft cream cheese and minced pimentos. In 1909, Eva Green Fuller's Up-to-Date Sandwich Book included a recipe calling for pimentos and Neufchâtel. By 1910 commercial versions had appeared, and ads appeared in parts of the North. According to food writer Robert F. Moss, writing in Serious Eats, through the period until World War II, the spread "was mentioned in hundreds of newspaper stories and advertisements, but none of them describe it as being in any way a Southern thing".

Original recipes called for canned Spanish pimentos, which were expensive; Southern farmers began growing pimentos to supply a less-expensive product. Southern cooks adapted the recipe using hoop cheese and mayonnaise. After World War II, the prevalence of the dish decreased in most of the U.S. but kept its popularity in the South, becoming relatively unknown outside that region. By the early 2000s, according to Moss, "an increasing number of Southern writers and chefs started celebrating the humble spread they remembered being made by their mothers, grandmothers, and aunts, and they started publishing recipes for it and even putting in on restaurant menus".

== Ingredients and preparation ==
The basic pimento cheese recipe typically contains grated cheddar cheese, mayonnaise, and chopped pimentos (also known as pimientos), mixed into a chunky paste.

Regional ingredients include horseradish, cream cheese, salt and pepper, Louisiana-style hot sauce, Worcestershire sauce, cayenne pepper, paprika, jalapeños, onions, garlic, and dill pickles. Family recipes often vary the ingredients.

== Serving ==
Pimento cheese can be served as a spread on crackers or celery, scooped onto corn chips or tortilla chips, mixed in with mashed yolks for deviled eggs, added to grits, and used as a topping for hamburgers or hotdogs.

The spread is often served as a sandwich filling, sometimes as a cocktail finger sandwich (with crusts trimmed, garnished with watercress, and cut into triangles) or rolled up and cut into pinwheels.

== Cultural importance ==
Pimento cheese is most closely associated with Southern cuisine and has been referred to as the "pâté of the South", "Carolina caviar" and "the caviar of the South."

Pimento cheese sandwiches have a long history at the Masters Tournament. They have been served there as a concession since the 1940s. Southern Living called the sandwich one of "the iconic foods of the Masters". Minor controversy ensued in 2013 when the Augusta National Golf Club switched food suppliers for the Masters and the new supplier was unable to duplicate the recipe used by the previous supplier, resulting in a sandwich with a markedly different taste. Sports Illustrated called the sandwich "legendary" and "more than a food option – it’s a representation of the sport's history and its traditions".

According to Southern Living, Rosalynn Carter once made pimento cheese sandwiches on a plane, handing them out to her grandchildren and other nearby passengers.

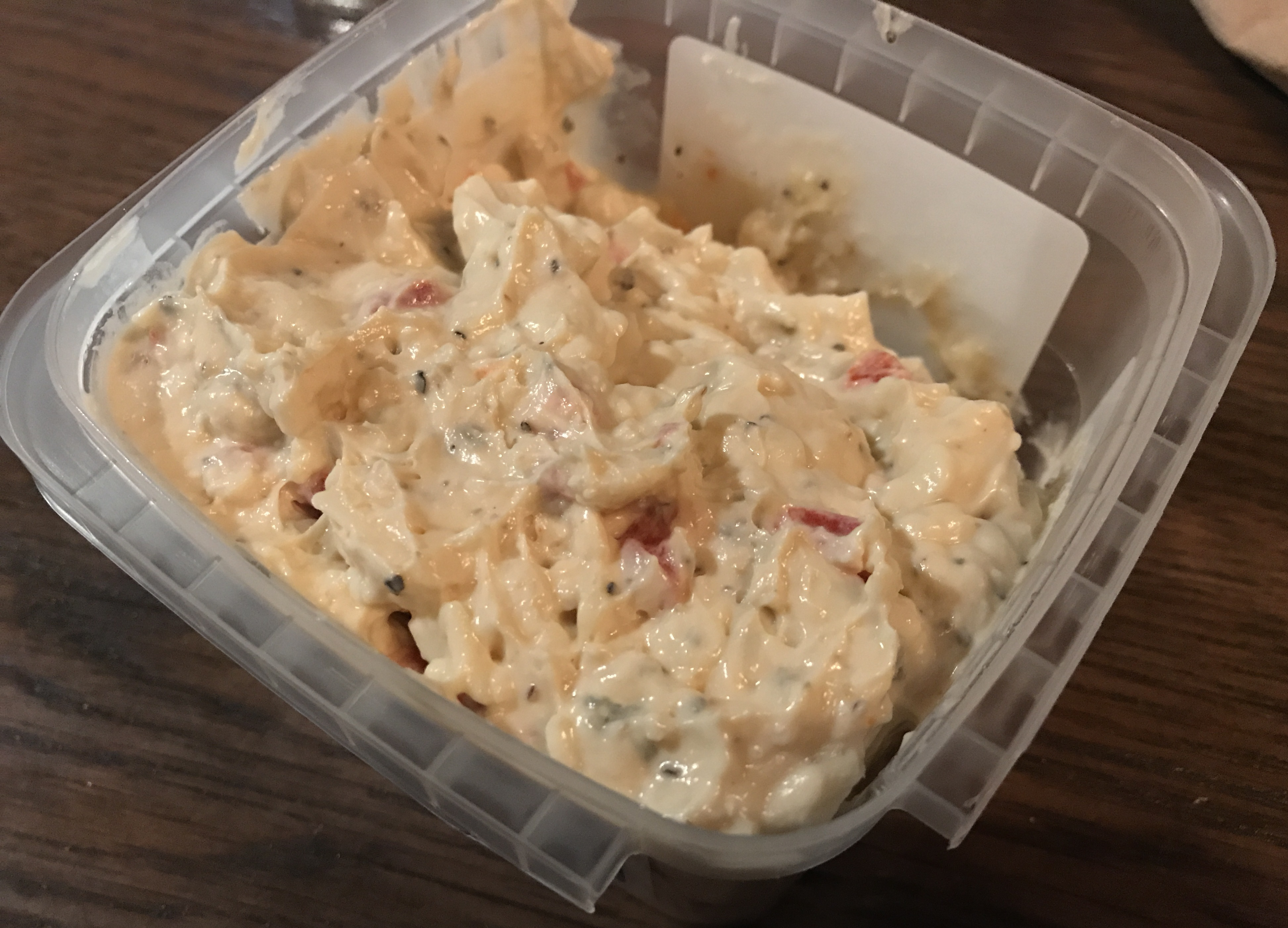
Close-up view of a commercial pimento cheese

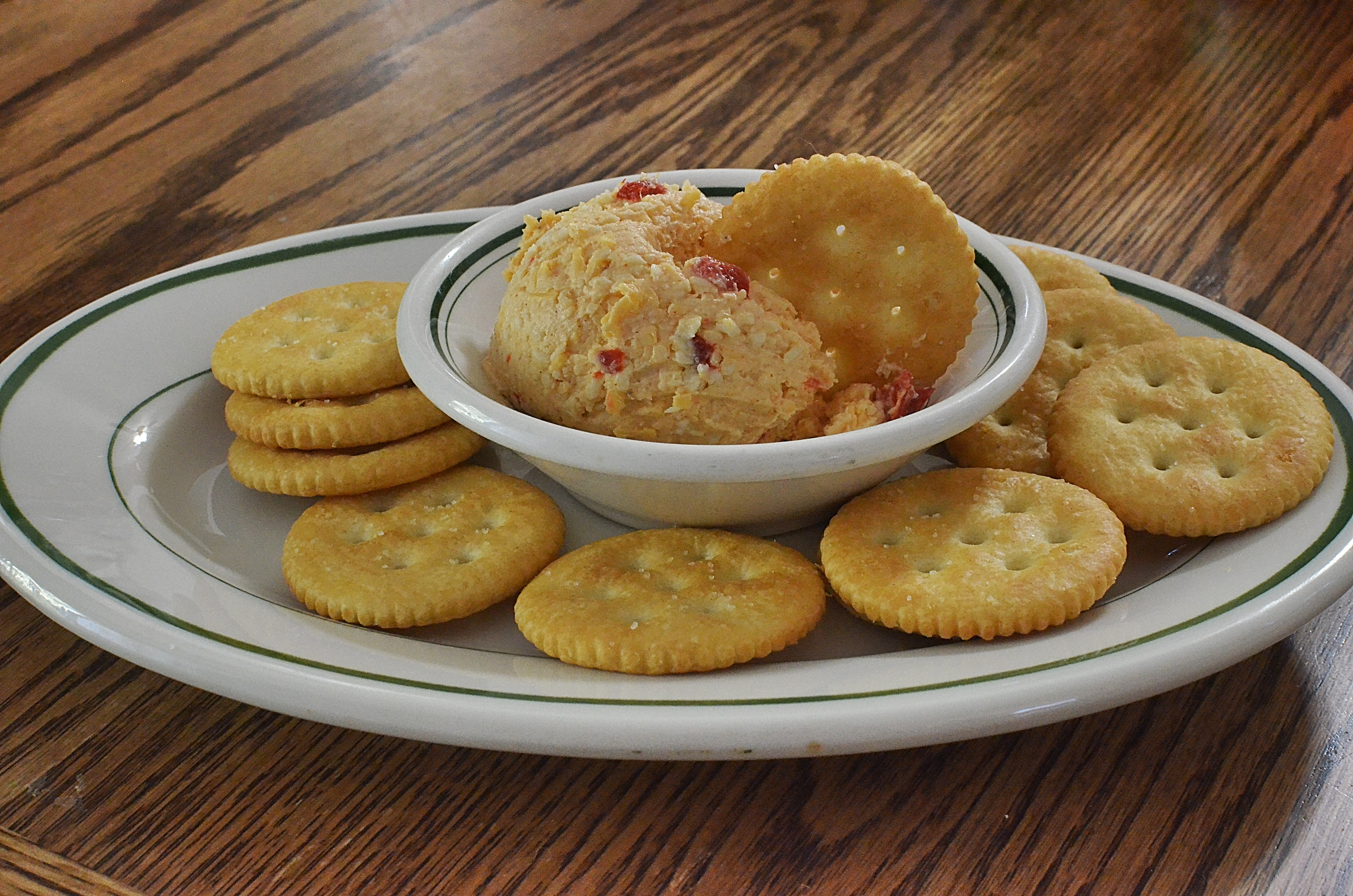
Homemade pimento cheese spread with crackers

== Similar dishes ==
A similar dish using queso de bola is known in the Philippines, where it is referred to as "cheese pimiento". A cheese ball is also a similar dish. In Alaska, a similar cheese dip is called Kenai dip, after the butcher shop in Kenai, Alaska, where a jalapeño variant originated. Almogrote is made in the Canary Islands with old goat cheese and local hot peppers.

== See also ==
- Benedictine
- Liptauer
- List of spreads
- Obatzda
- Palmetto Cheese
- Urnebes
- Pimento (Better Call Saul)
