= Cheese spread =

Soft and spreadable cheese product

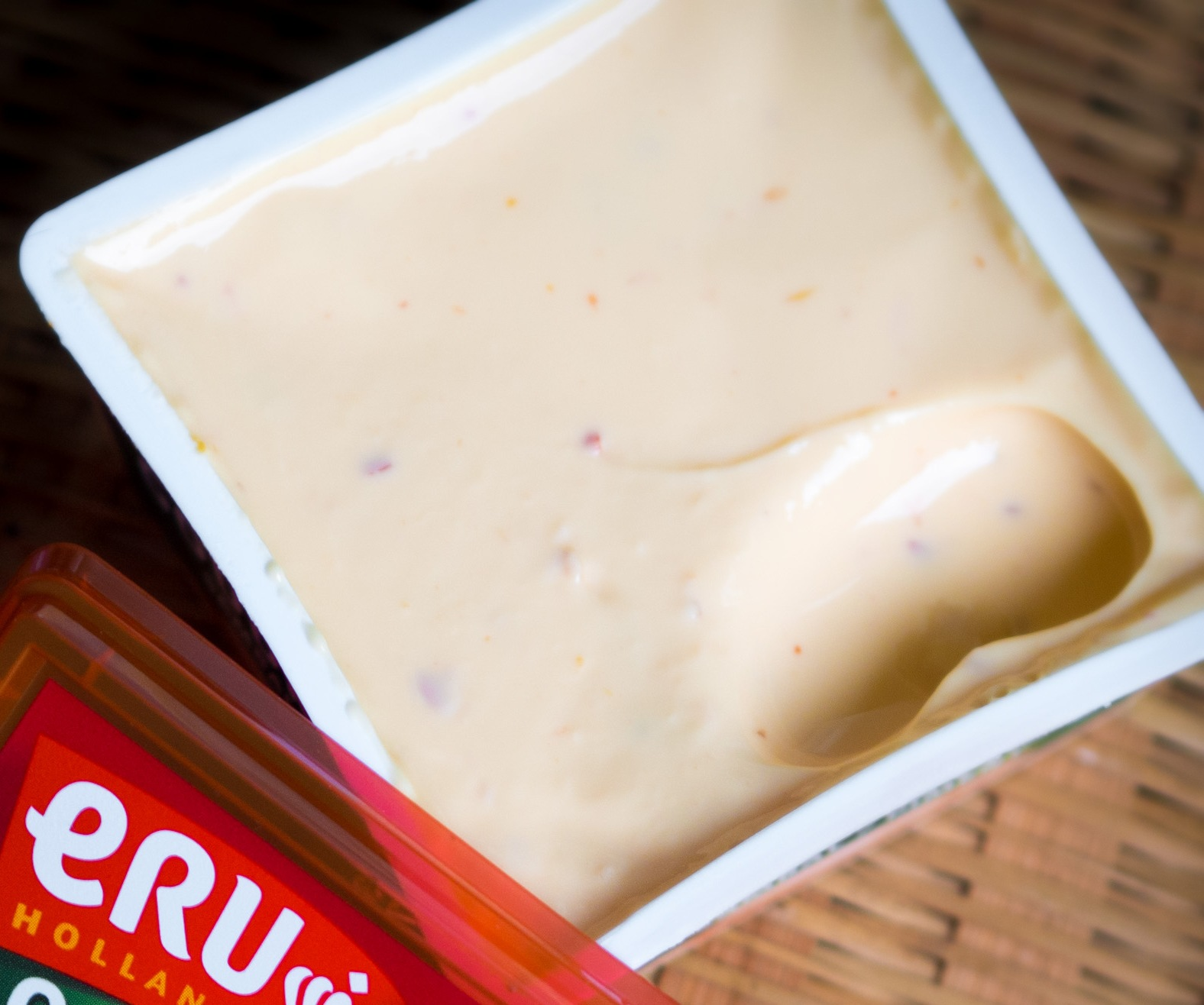
Eru Goudkuipje Sambal, a Dutch commercial processed cheese spread prepared using chili paste as one of its ingredients

Cheese spread is a soft spreadable cheese or processed cheese product. Various additional ingredients are sometimes used, such as multiple cheeses, fruits, vegetables and meats, and many types of cheese spreads exist. Pasteurized process cheese spread is a type of cheese spread prepared using pasteurized processed cheese and other ingredients.

== Overview ==
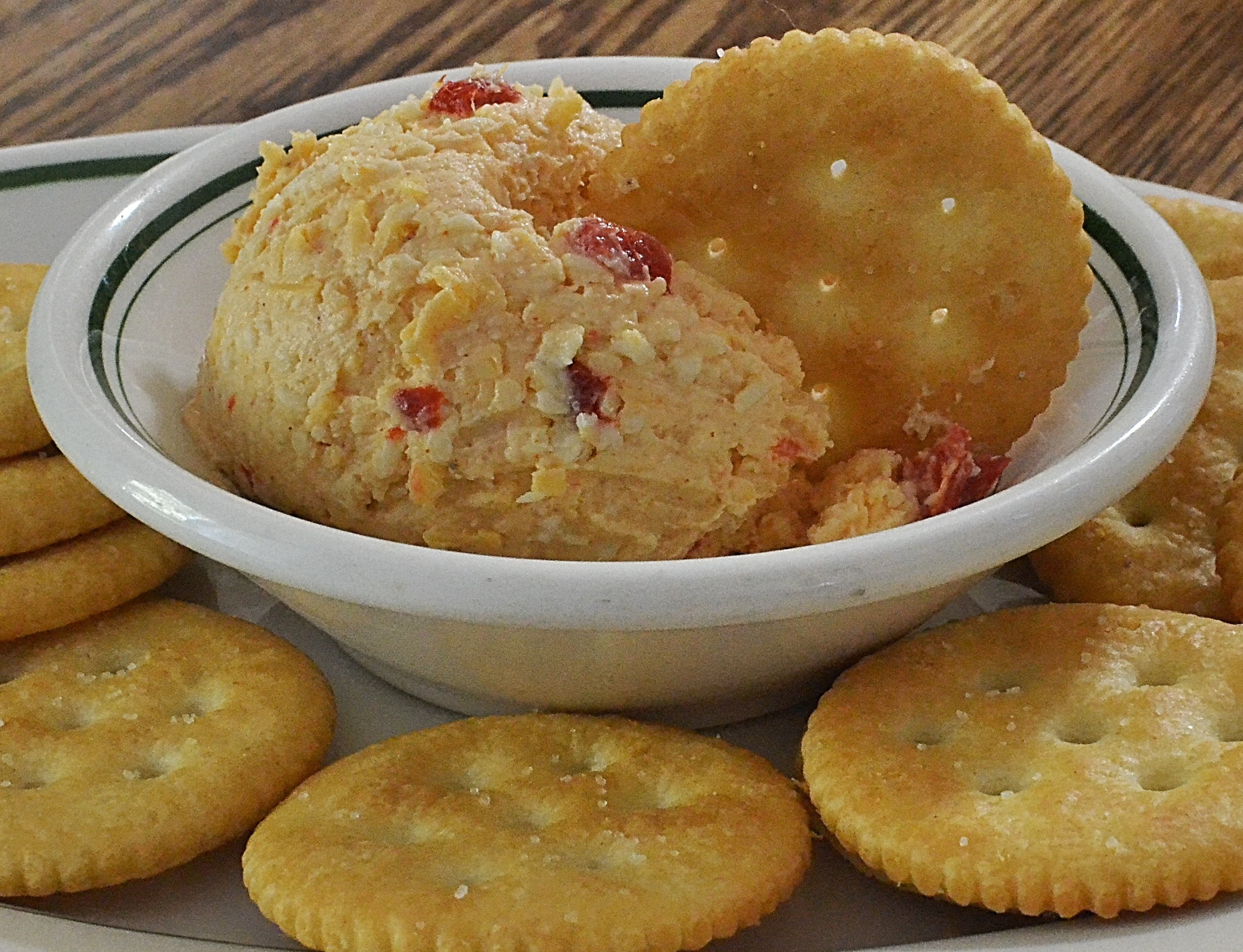
Homemade pimento cheese spread with crackers

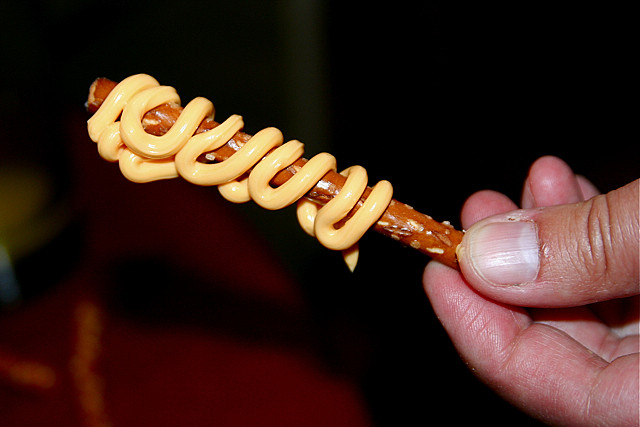
Easy Cheese, a pasteurized processed cheese spread product, on a pretzel

Cheese spread is prepared using one or more cheeses or processed cheese and sometimes additional ingredients such as vegetables, fruits, meats and various spices and seasonings. Cheese spread is typically spread onto foods such as bread, toast, crackers and vegetables.

Cheese spread can be commercially packaged in many ways:

- in plastic tubs
- in small foil-wrapped triangles or squares grouped together in a cardboard container, such as Dairylea or The Laughing Cow
- in a pressurized can in which the cheese product comes out in a string-like form, such as Easy Cheese
- in a jar in semi-liquid form, such as Cheez Whiz
- as a solid in a butter-like bar, such as Velveeta.

== Varieties ==
Many types of cheese spreads exist, such as almogrote, Liptauer, cervelle de canut and tirokafteri, among others.

=== United States ===
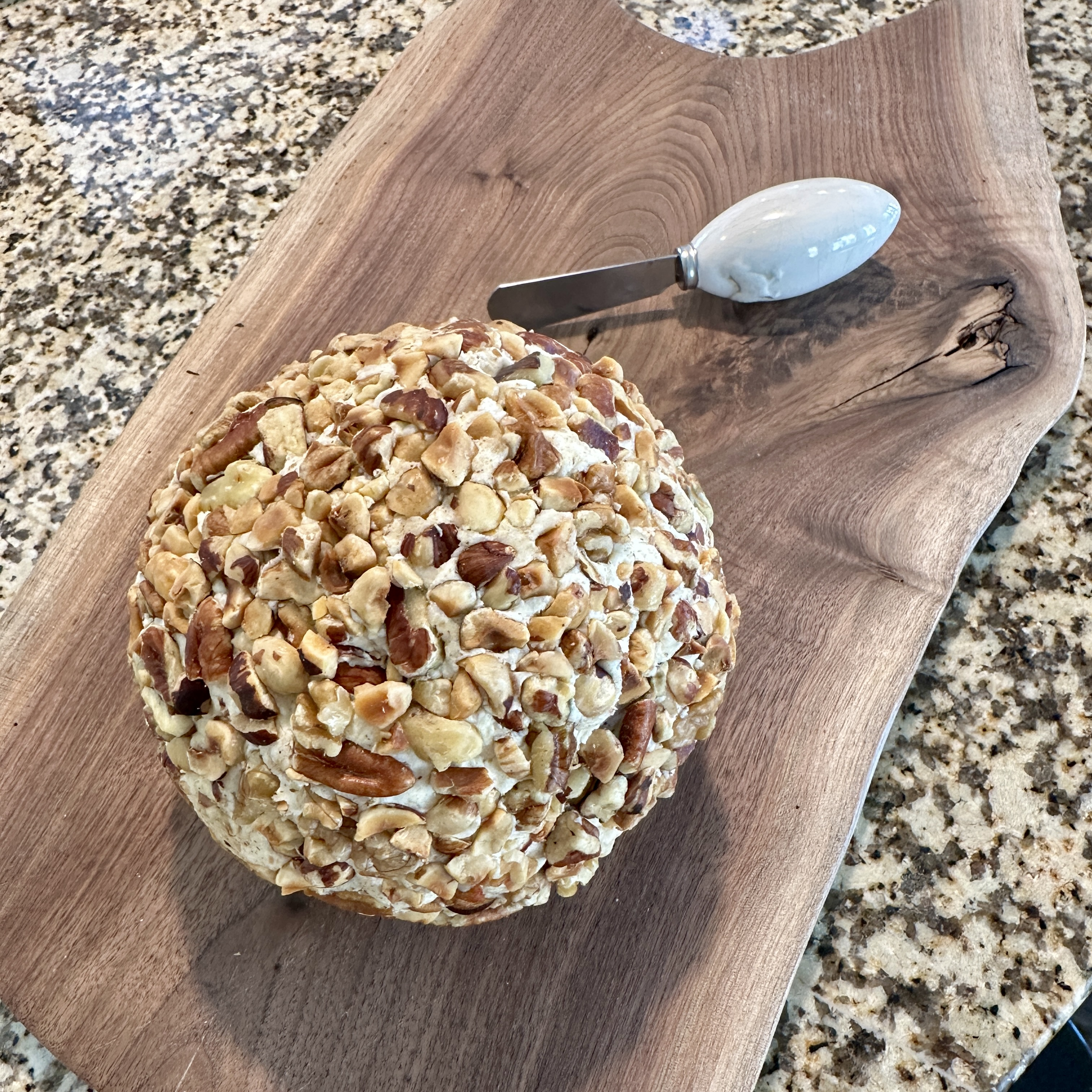
Cheese ball, a type of cheese spread

In the United States, beer cheese spread is a traditional food of the U.S. state of Kentucky. Pimento cheese is a food in the cuisine of the Southern United States that has been referred to as the "pâté of the south" and "Carolina caviar". Port wine cheese is mass-produced in the United States under several brands. Pub cheese is a soft cheese spread that is a traditional bar snack in the United States. Additional U.S. cheese spreads include benedictine, cold pack cheese and cup cheese. A cheese ball is a type of cheese spread.

=== Pasteurized process cheese spread ===
Pasteurized process cheese spread is a pasteurized processed cheese product prepared using one or more cheeses, additional ingredients and sometimes food additives such as emulsifiers (e.g. potassium phosphate and tartrate) and food stabilizers to limit product separation (e.g. carrageenan and xanthan gum). Cream, milkfat, sweeteners, water, salt, various seasonings and artificial color are sometimes used as ingredients.

In the United States, the amount of cheese products used in pasteurized process cheese spread must be at least 51 percent, must contain at least 20 percent milkfat, and the moisture content must be between 44 percent to 60 percent, not exceeding 60 percent. Pasteurized process cheese spread is prepared by heating the ingredients and then pouring the mixture into various molds and containers to cool and become solid. After cooling occurs, the product is then packaged.

== Gallery ==
Cheese spreads

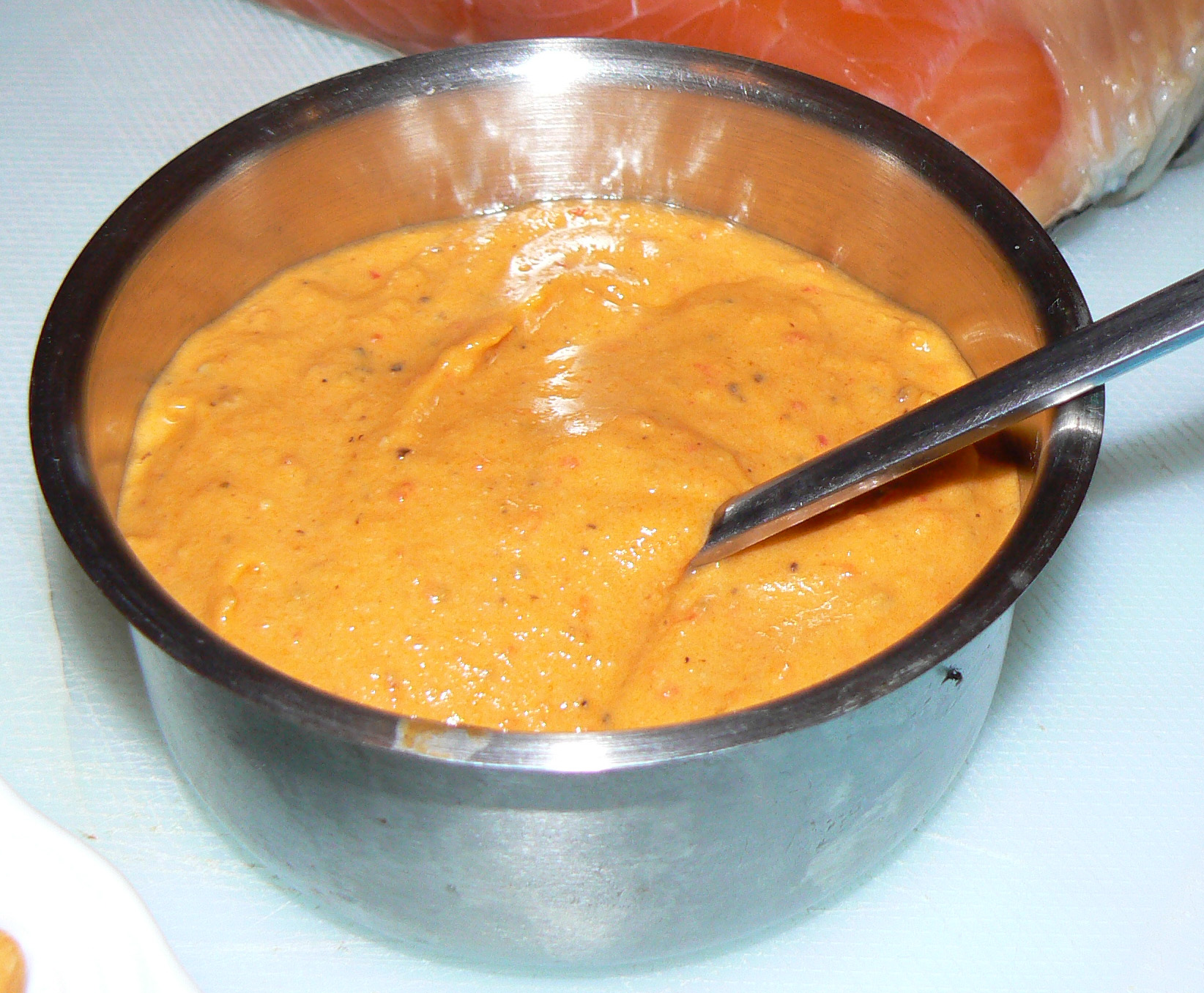
Almogrote

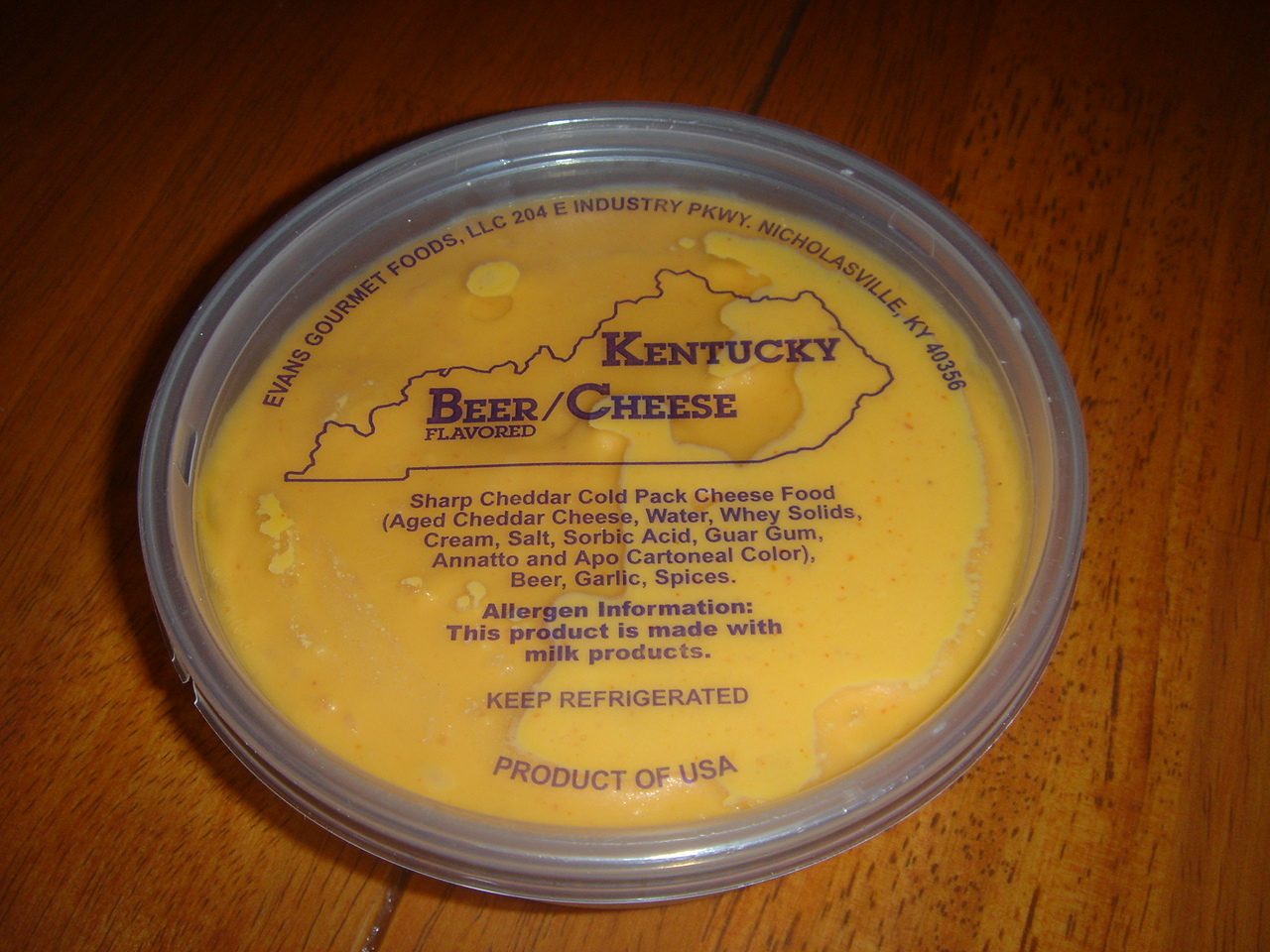
A commercial beer cheese spread

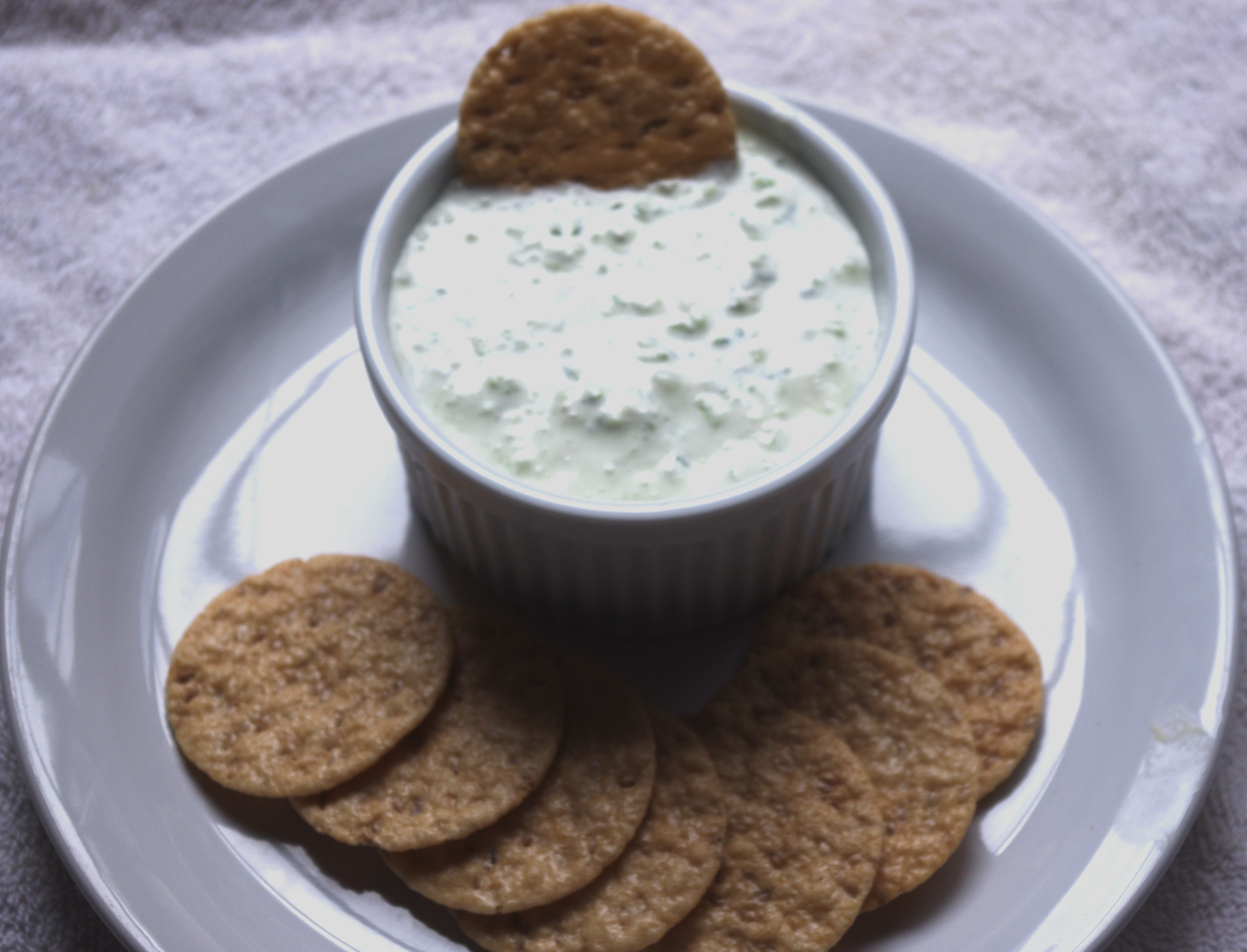
Benedictine used as a dip

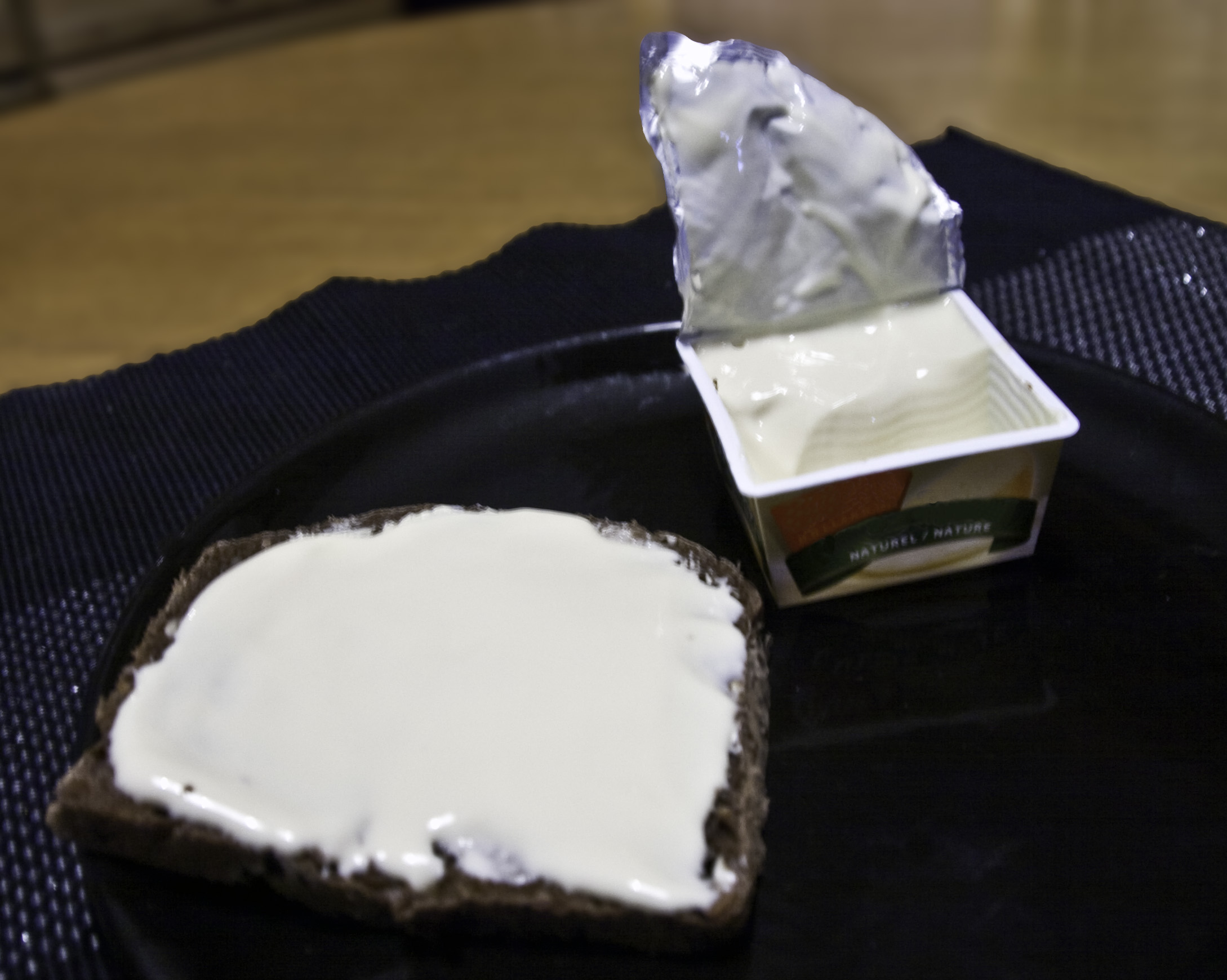
A Dutch commercial cheese spread on bread

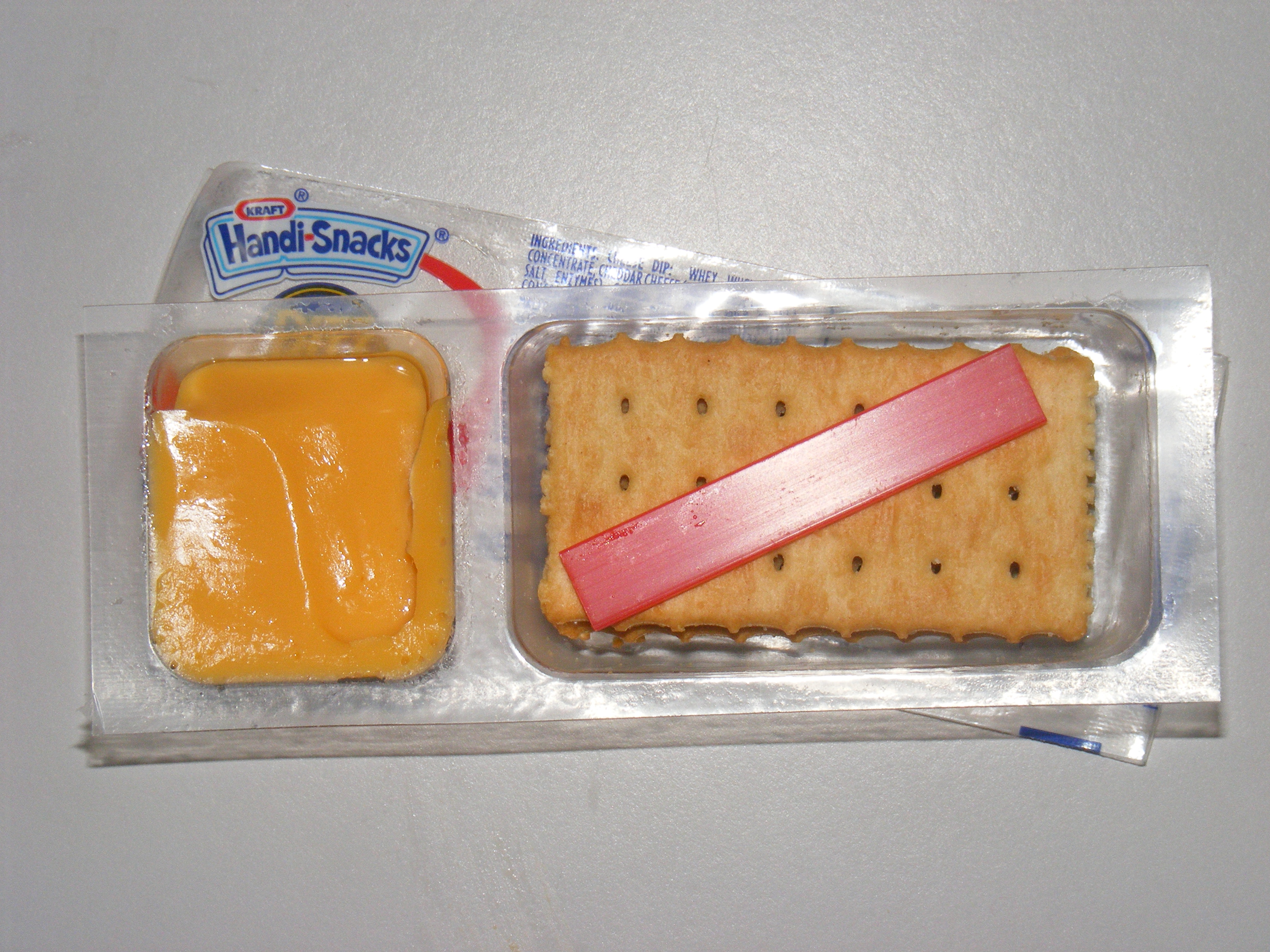
Handi-Snacks is a snack food product consisting of crackers and a cheese spread.

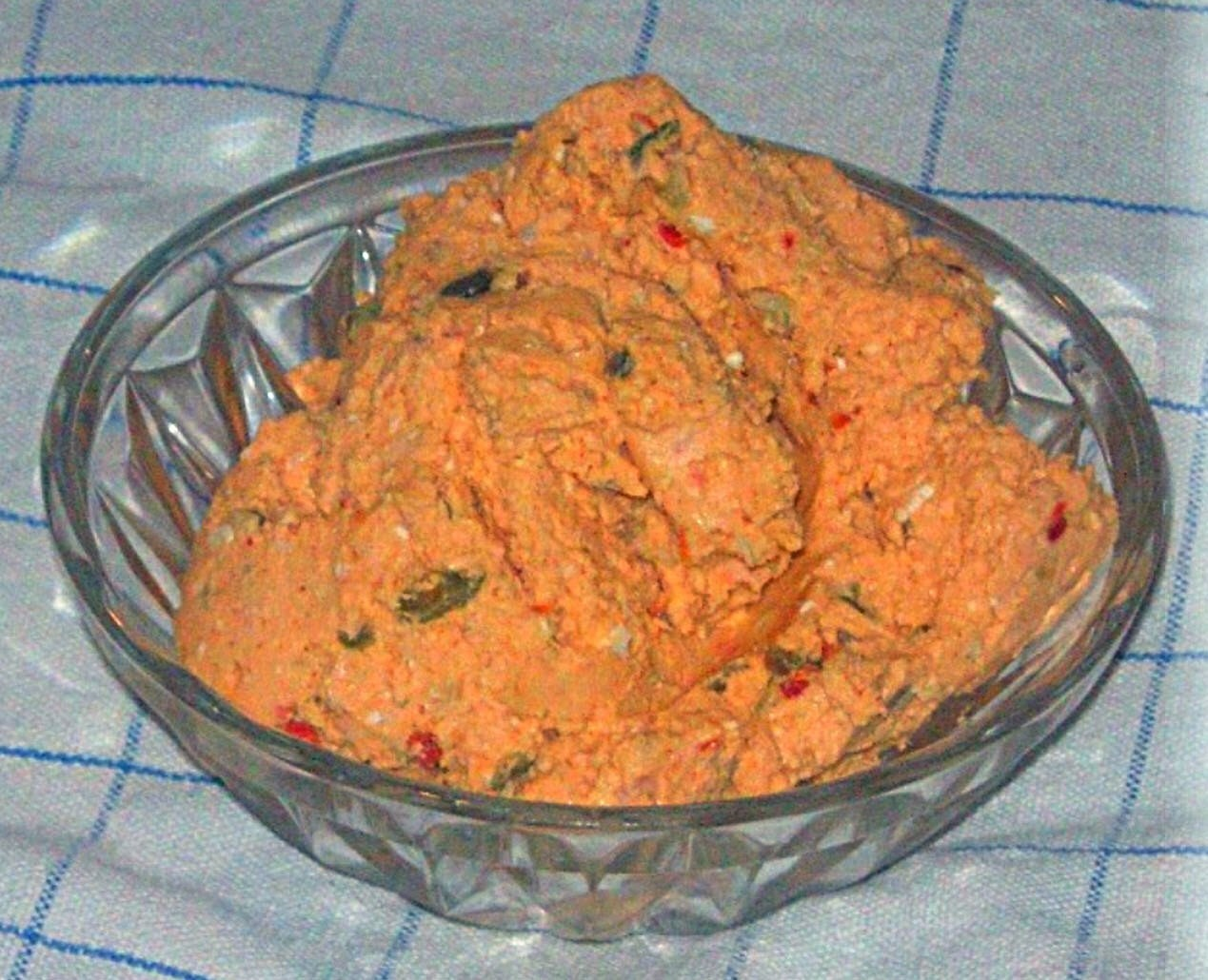
Liptauer

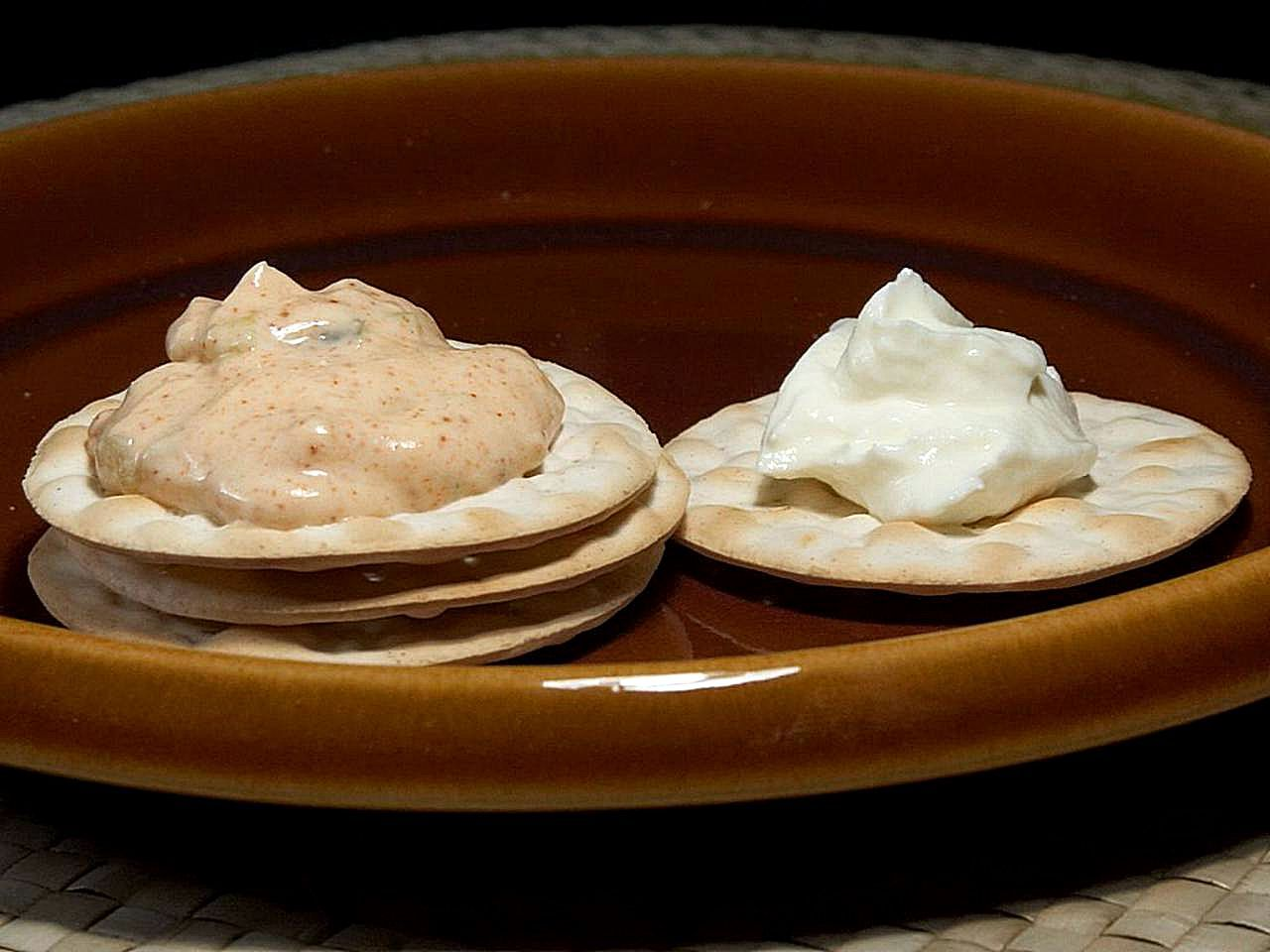
Liptauer prepared with quark cheese

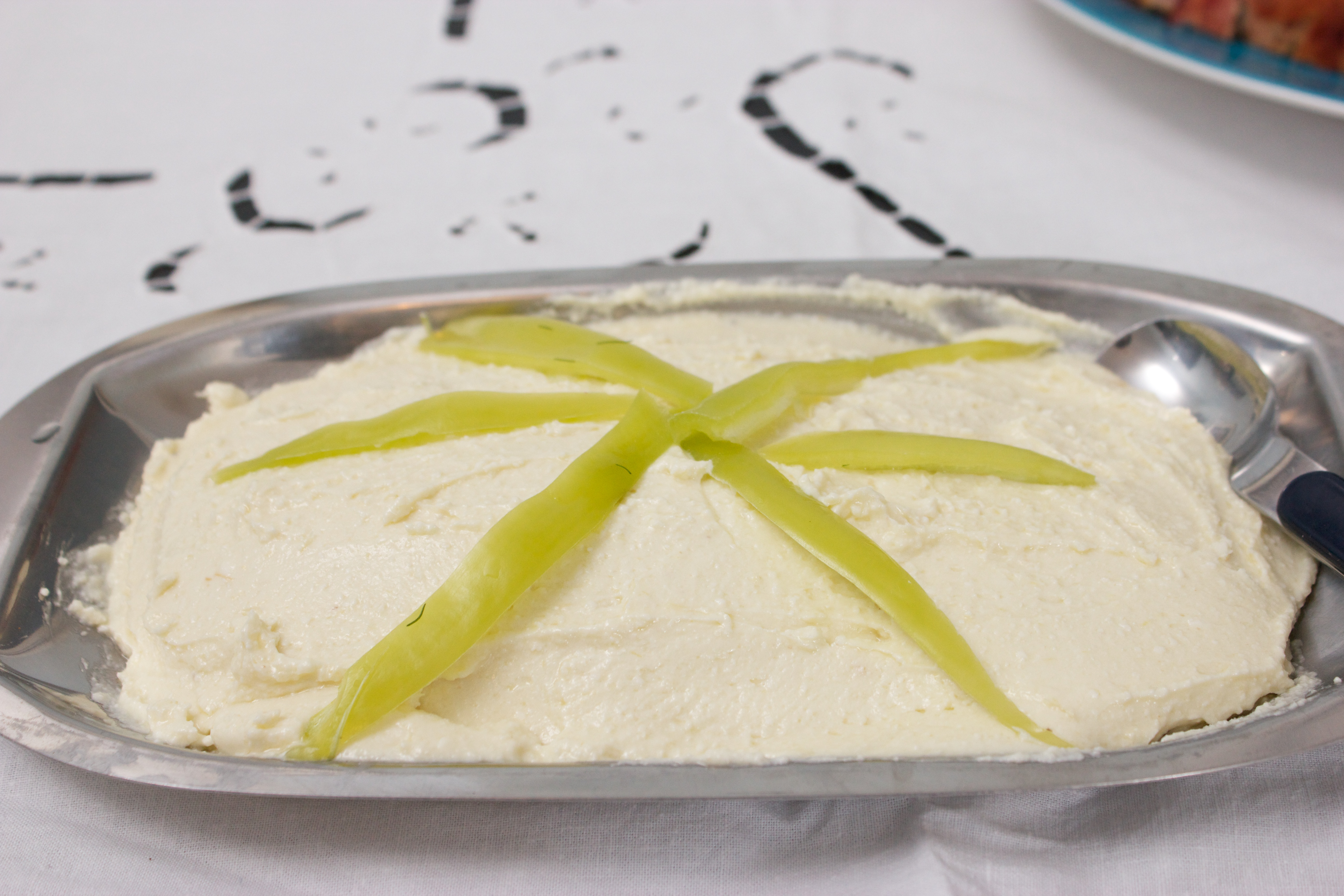
Tirokafteri is a cheese spread from Greece and surrounding Balkan countries.

== See also ==
- Cream cheese
- List of cheese dishes
- List of spreads
- Neufchâtel cheese
- Velveeta – a brand name processed cheese product
