= Cold pack cheese =

Type of cheese spread

Cold-pack cheese
- Alternative names: Club cheese
- Type: Cheese spread
- Place of origin: United States
- Region or state: Wisconsin
- Created by: Hubert Fassbender
- Invented: c. 1930
- Main ingredients: Cheese
- Ingredients generally used: Spices, fruits, vegetables, or nuts

Cold-pack cheese, also known as club cheese or crock cheese, is a type of cheese spread that is created by blending natural cheeses without the use of heat.

Cold-pack cheese was first made by a Wisconsin tavern owner for snacking during the height of the Great Depression. It is often made using Cheddar or Swiss cheeses as a base, using added spices, fruits, vegetables, or nuts as flavoring. Common flavorings include almonds, port wine, horseradish, and smoked flavor.

Being made without heat, cold-pack cheese is not shelf-stable and requires refrigeration. Compared to cheese spreads made with heat, cold-pack cheese better preserves the taste and texture of its constituent cheeses.

The FDA has standards of identity for the production of "cold-pack and club cheese", "cold-pack cheese food", and "cold-pack cheese food with fruits, vegetables, or meats." Any cheese except "cream cheese, neufchatel cheese, cottage cheese, creamed cottage cheese, cook cheese, skim-milk cheese for manufacturing,[...] semisoft part-skim cheese, part-skim spiced cheese, and hard grating cheese" may be used. The added flavor(s) must not mimic the flavor of cheese.

As with most cheese spreads, cold-pack cheese is a soft, spreadable blend of cheeses that can be used in a variety of applications. It can be used as an ingredient in sandwiches, on top of hot foods such as potatoes, as a base for a cheese sauce, or simply on its own, served with crackers as an appetizer.

== See also ==
- List of spreads
