= Cheese ball =

Cheese ball or Cheeseball may refer to:

- Bocconcini, mozzarella cheese balls
- Cheese puffs, a processed snack made from puffed corn and cheese, sometimes ball-shaped
- Cheese spread, usually served around Christmas in the United States and Canada
  - Cheese ball (hors d'oeuvre), an American style of cheese spread
- Edam cheese, a Dutch cheese in the shape of a ball
- Fried cheese curds, breaded and fried cheese curds
- Pão de queijo, or Brazilian cheese ball, a baked cheese bun
