= Liptauer =

Central European cheese spread

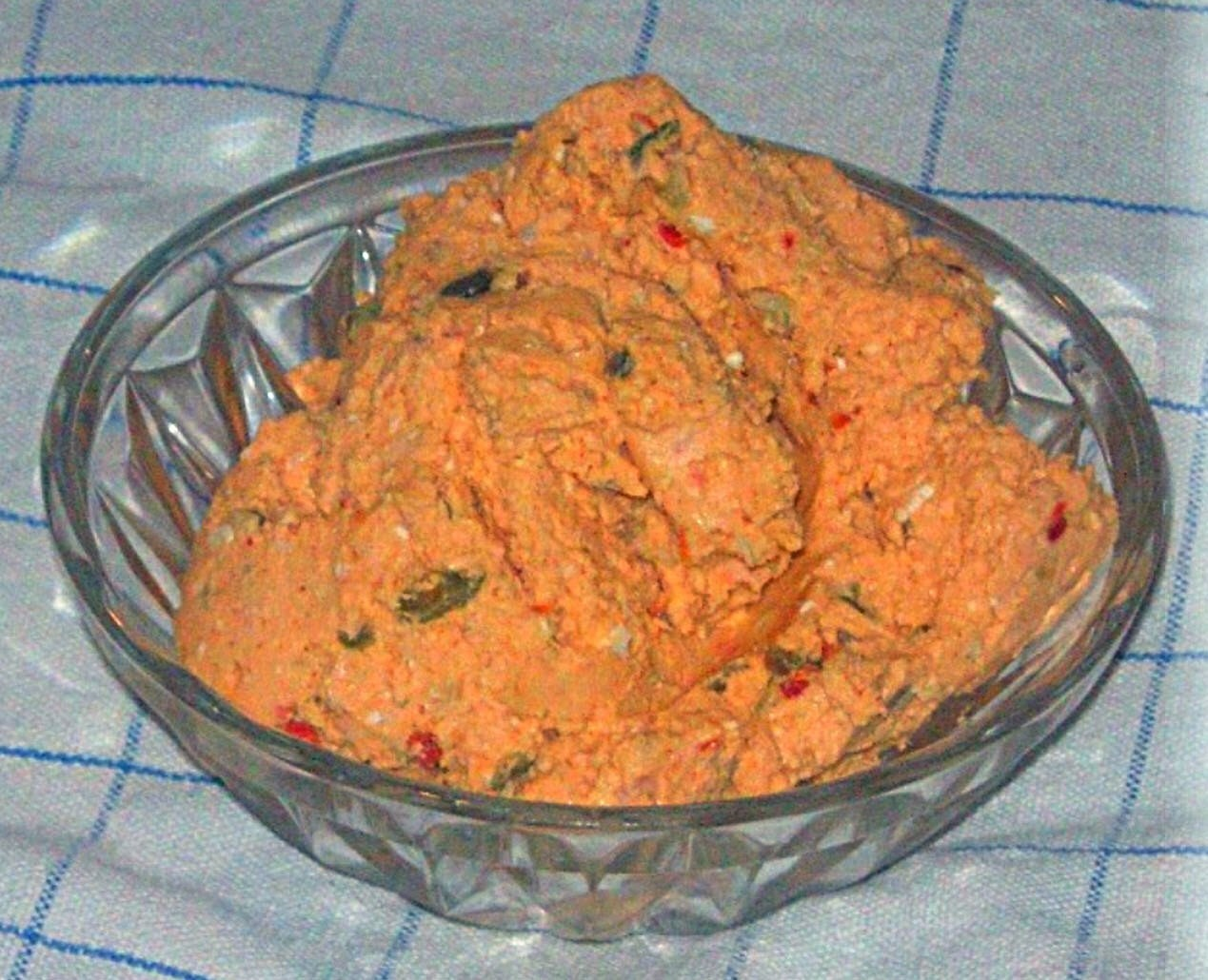
- Type: Cheese spread
- Main ingredients: Cheeses such as sheep milk, goat milk, quark or cottage

Liptauer is a spicy cheese spread from Slovak, Austrian and Hungarian cuisine. Liptauer is made with sheep milk cheese, goat cheese, quark, or cottage cheese.

== Etymology ==
The name is derived from the German name Liptau or Liptó for the former county Liptov in northern Slovakia.

== Overview ==
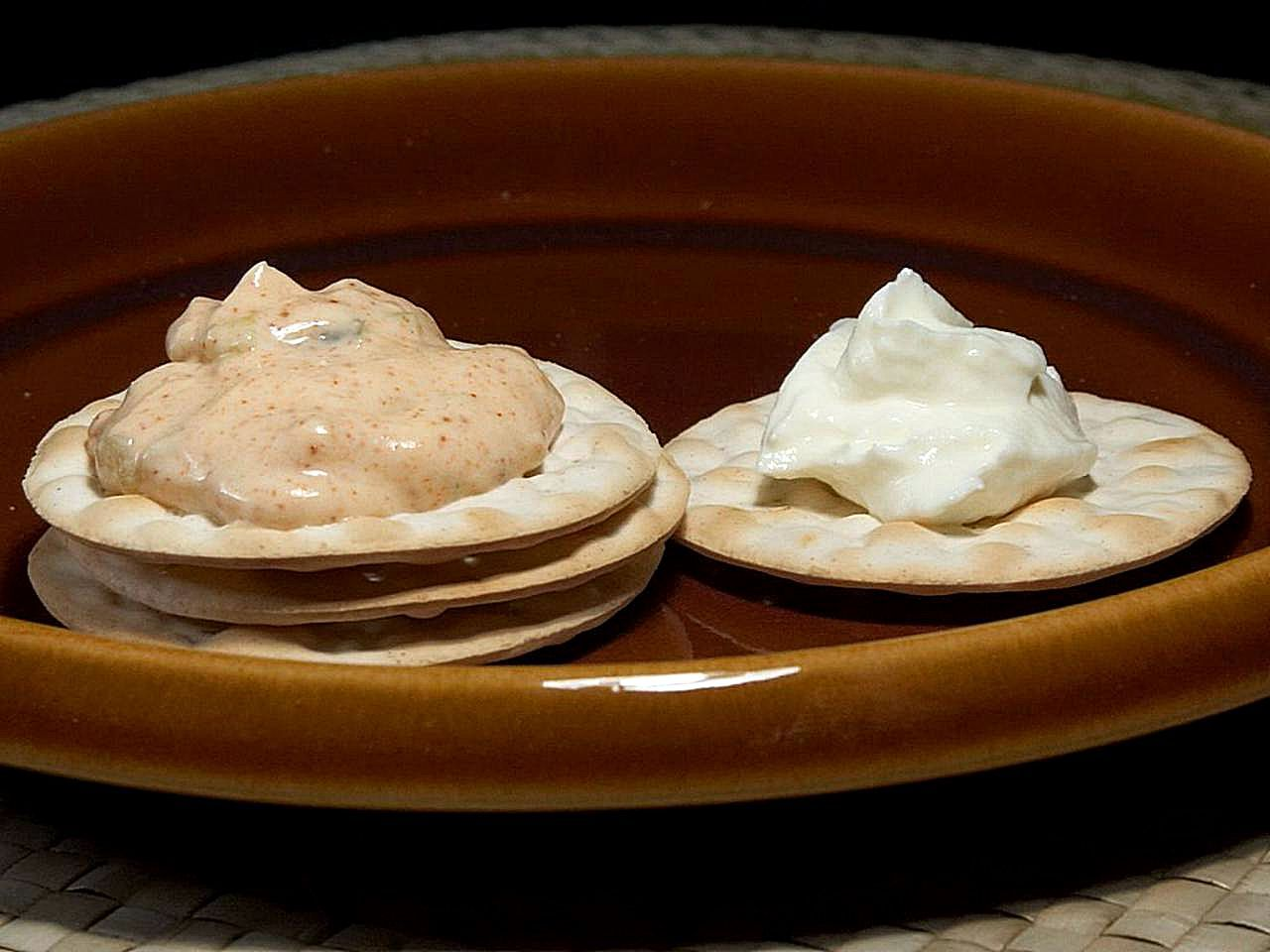
Liptauer prepared with quark cheese

It is a part of the regional cuisines of Slovakia (as Šmirkás, a form of the German Schmierkäse for cheese spread), Hungary (körözött), Austria (Liptauer), Slovenia (liptaver), Serbia (urnebes salata, "chaos salad"), Croatia, Albania (liptao), Italy (especially in the province of Trieste), and Romania (especially in Transylvania, where it typically goes by the Hungarian name, körözött).

The three main ingredients are spreadable white cheese like quark, chives and paprika. About one third of "traditional" Liptauer consists of bryndza, a sheep milk cheese. Other soft cheeses used include cottage cheese, quark and goat. These are mixed with sour cream, butter or margarine and finely chopped onions; sometimes beer is added. Usual spices include ground paprika, fresh parsley and whole (or ground) caraway seeds. Variants add others such as prepared mustard, Worcestershire sauce, capers and anchovy paste.

In Szeklerland and among other Transylvanian Hungarians, tarragon is also mixed in.

== Consumption ==
Liptauer is traditionally eaten as an open sandwich, especially with rye bread or pumpernickel toast, or bagels, and also as an appetizer with crackers, served with beer or wine, or as a filling for cold dishes such as stuffed tomatoes, peppers, celery or hard boiled eggs. Ready-made Liptauer is generally available in small tinfoil packages and has a spicy, sharp taste.

In Austria, Liptauer is a typical snack served at Heurigen, Austrian wine-drinking taverns. In Slovakia and Hungary many families have their own recipe for the dish. In Serbia, Liptauer is available in most restaurants that serve local cuisine. It is often made spicy with paprika, roasted red peppers and egg yolks.

Another substitutes for bryndza:

- Schlierbacher cheese (in German)
- Mondseer cheese (in German)
- Pálpusztai cheese

== See also ==
- Urnebes
- List of cheeses
- List of spreads
- Obatzda
- Pimento cheese
