= Palmetto Cheese =

Pimento cheese brand in the United States

Palmetto Cheese is a trademarked brand of pimento cheese from Pawleys Island Specialty Foods, a division of Get Carried Away, LLC based in Pawleys Island, South Carolina — and originally made and packaged at Duke Sandwich Productions in Easley, South Carolina. It is marketed in original, jalapeño, and bacon variations.

== History ==
The cheese was commercially marketed beginning in 2006 with 20 packages for sale at Independent Seafood in Georgetown, South Carolina.

To meet demand, production was outsourced to a Simpsonville, South Carolina, company. In 2011, distribution nearly doubled with the addition of Giant-Carlisle, Giant-Landover, Stop & Shop, and Albertsons locations. In April 2012, the cheese became available in Walmart stores, leading contract manufacturer Duke Sandwich to develop a new 80,000-square-foot facility to accommodate increased production.

In 2013, the company marketed 4.1 million containers of the cheese, with the original variety as the company's top seller, followed by the jalapeño and bacon varieties.

== 2020 controversy ==
I am sickened by the senseless killings in Georgetown last night. 2 [sic] innocent people murdered. Not 2 thugs or people wanted on multiple warrants. 2 white people defenselessly gunned down by a black man, so why do we stand by and allow BLM to lawlessly destroy great American cities and threaten their citizens on a daily basis ... this has gone on too long. Rise up America. This BLM and Antifa movement must be treated like the terror organizations they are.

Brian Henry, owner Palmetto Cheese

In 2020, Palmetto Cheese was removed from the shelves by Costco and faced boycotts after its owner, Brian Henry, while serving as the mayor of Pawleys Island, South Carolina, referred to Black Lives Matter as a "terror organization" in a Facebook post.

Henry said a boycott would harm workers, later apologizing for the post.

The company's packaging, which had previously featured a photograph of Vertrella Brown, a former African American cook at Pawleys Island's Sea View Inn, was subsequently revised, deleting Brown's photograph, and the company's website briefly carried a prominent statement: "We view elevating racial equality as one of our brand's responsibilities. Palmetto Cheese is evolving and listening to the black American community, our customers, and business partners. We are committed to lead as an advocate for uniting the community, starting with a rebranding of our product identity."

== See also ==
- Pimento cheese
- Pub cheese
