= Tirokafteri =

Greek cheese-based spread

Ktipiti
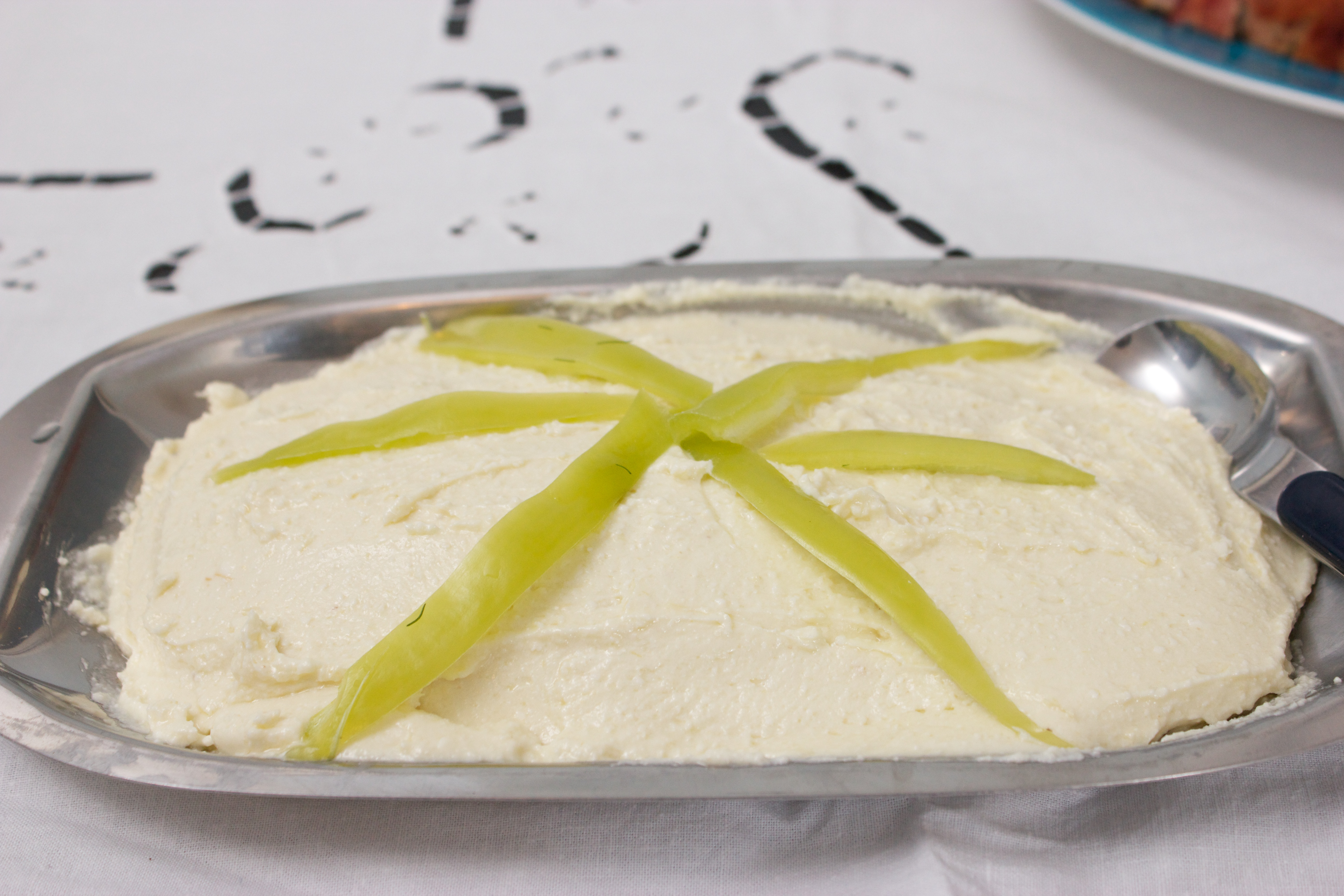
- Type: Spread
- Main ingredients: feta cheese, hot peppers, roasted peppers, olive oil, lemon juice, garlic, yogurt, oregano

Tirokafteri (Greek: τυροκαυτερή, pronounced [tirokafteˈri]), also known as ktipiti or htipiti (Greek: χτυπητή, pronounced [xtipiˈti]) or kopanisti (not to be confused with the cheese of that name), is a cheese-based spread from Greece.

The preparation of the dish varies, but the most common ingredients are feta cheese (sometimes combined with one or more other types of soft, white cheeses), hot peppers (such as red cherry pepper), roasted peppers, olive oil, lemon juice, garlic, yogurt, or oregano. It is commonly eaten as part of a mezze platter, or by itself, with slices of warm pita bread.

== See also ==
- List of spreads
