= Cheese ball (hors d'oeuvre) =

American hors d'oeuvre

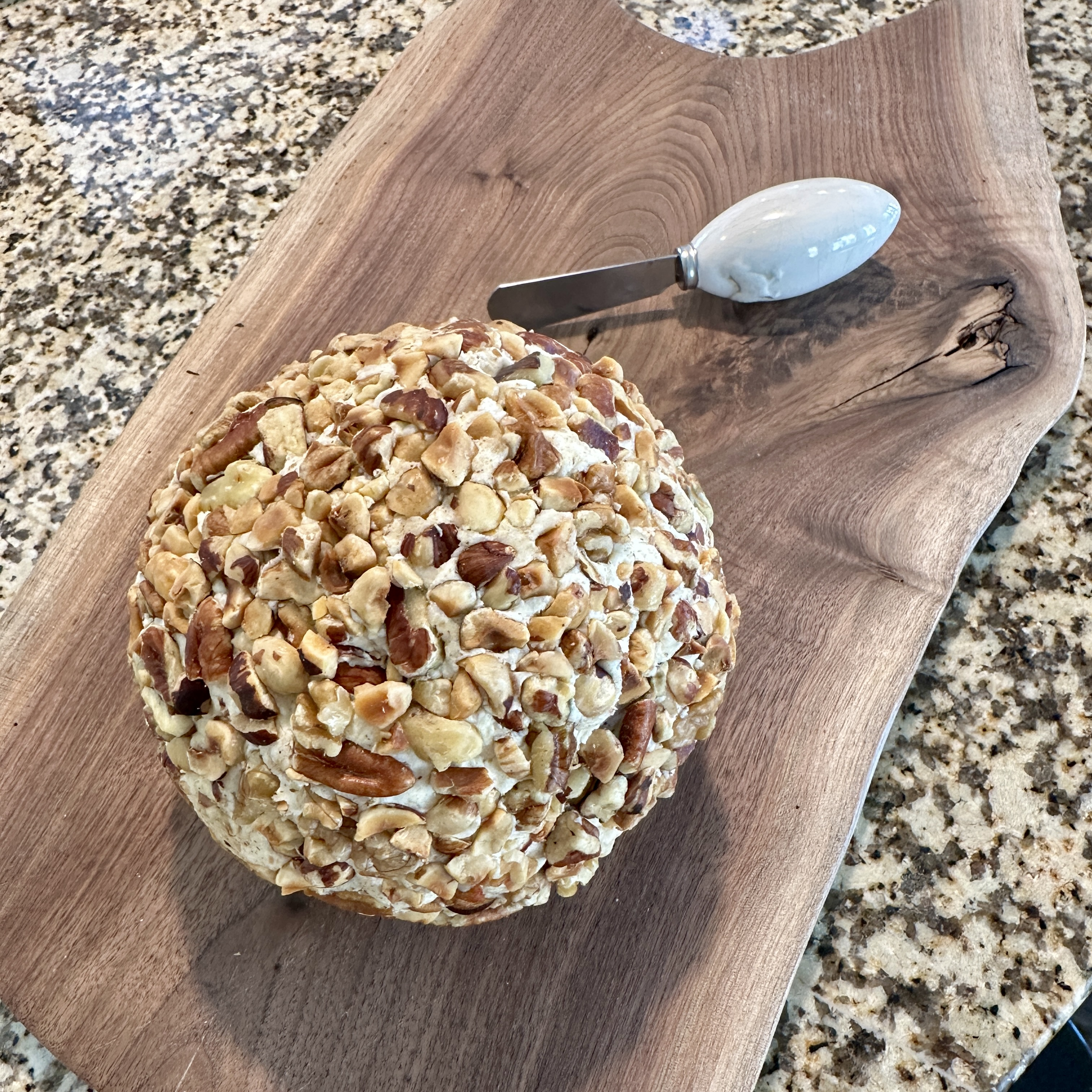
Amy Sedaris's Li'l Smokey cheese ball

A cheese ball is an American hors d'oeuvre that is a type of cheese spread. It first appeared in the 1940s, fell out of fashion, and then had a resurgence in popularity in the 21st century.

== Ingredients, preparation and serving ==
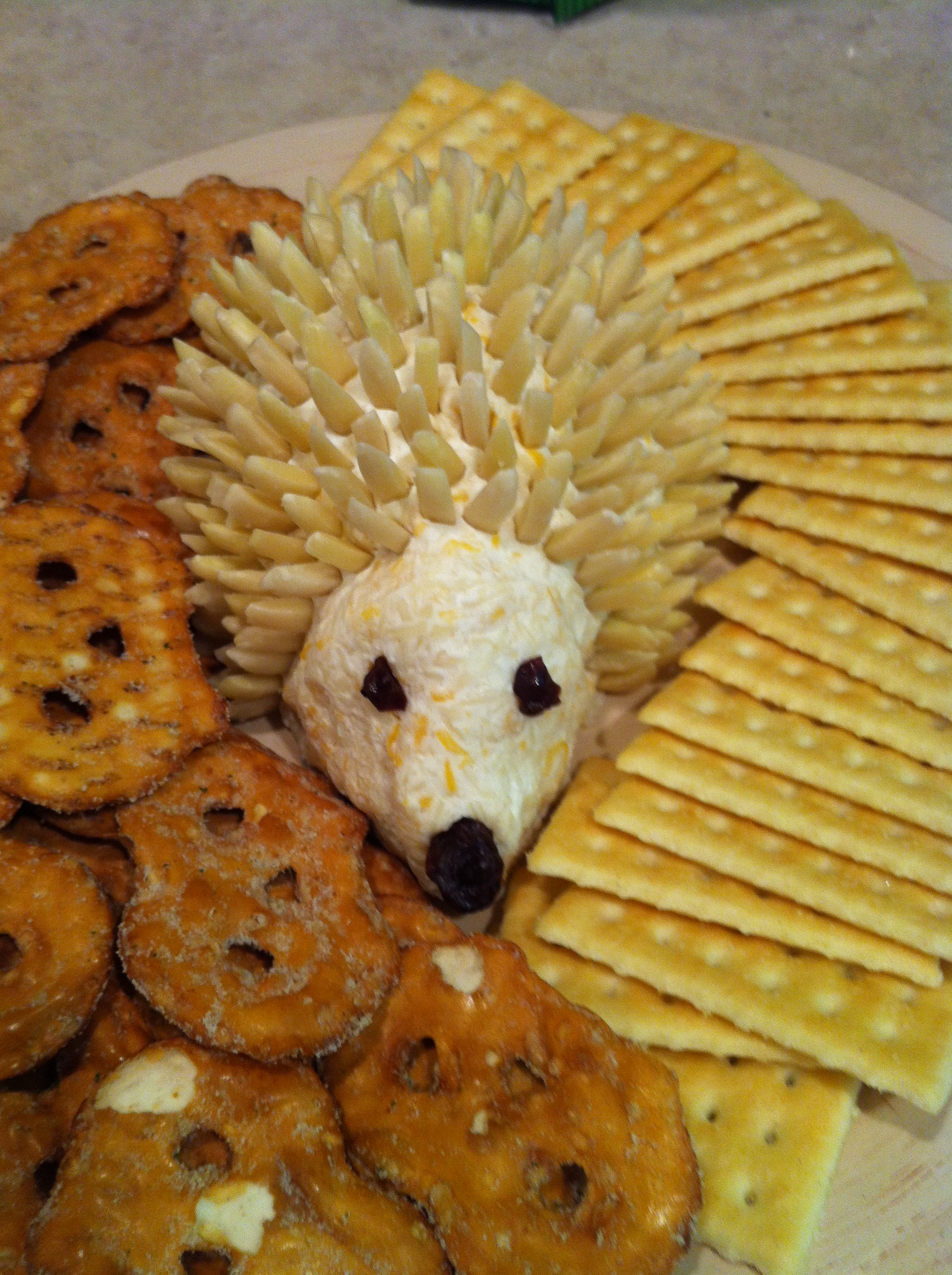
Cheese ball hedgehog with crackers

The cheese ball is typically made from grated hard cheese and softened cream cheese, sometimes with some sort of binder such as mayonnaise; the mixture is shaped, chilled to resolidify, and often rolled in nuts, seeds, or herbs to provide a decorative finish. It is often served with crackers or crudites at holiday parties in the United States.

Cheese balls are sometimes formed into wheels or logs rather than balls or shaped and decorated to represent a variety of items such as owls or pineapples.

== Origins ==
The dish is representative of mid-20th century US cuisine. According to Splendid Table the first recipe appeared in a 1944 cookbook by Virginia Safford, a "wildly popular columnist" for the Minneapolis Star Journal.

== Popularity ==
The dish fell out of fashion for a period; by the late 1980s the term "cheeseball" was synonymous with "lacking style, taste, or originality". According to Amanda Hesser, writing for the New York Times in 2003, it "tend[s] to be associated with shag rugs and tinsel, symbols of the middle-class middlebrow". Kim Severson, writing for The New York Times in 2016, said it was "the culinary equivalent of a Rorschach test".

Amy Sedaris and her brother David wrote a play, The Book of Liz, that focuses on cheese balls as a metaphor for "the cliches we all live by", according to Ben Brantley. She included a recipe in her 2006 cookbook, Hosting a Party Under the Influence, and in 2007 made a version on the Martha Stewart Show, which according to Severson, "elevated cheese ball kitsch to an art form". According to Splendid Table's Jennifer Russell, writing in 2014, "Sedaris may be singlehandedly responsible for the cheese ball's revival." In 2014 Culture, an industry magazine, said "cheese balls are making their comeback". MplsStPaul Magazine called 2016 "the year of the cheese ball", calling the dish "the North’s answer to Southern pimento cheese".
