= Almogrote =

Spread of Canary Islands cuisine

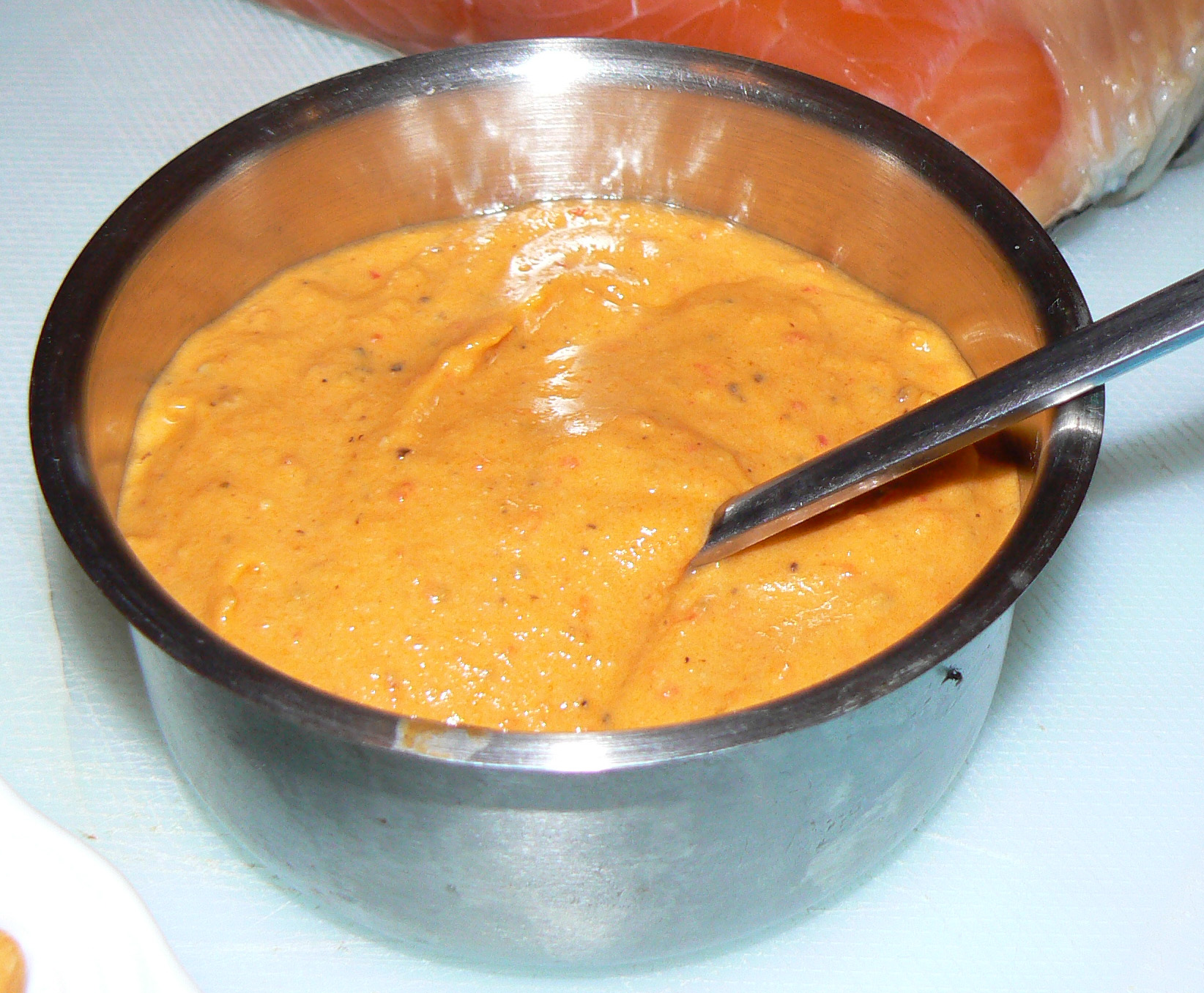
- Type: Spread
- Place of origin: Canary Islands
- Region or state: La Gomera
- Main ingredients: Hard cheese, peppers, olive oil, garlic

Almogrote is a soft paste made from hard cheese, peppers, olive oil, garlic, and other ingredients, which is typically eaten spread on toast. It is native to La Gomera in the Canary Islands.

== See also ==
- List of spreads
