= Urnebes =

Serbian dish

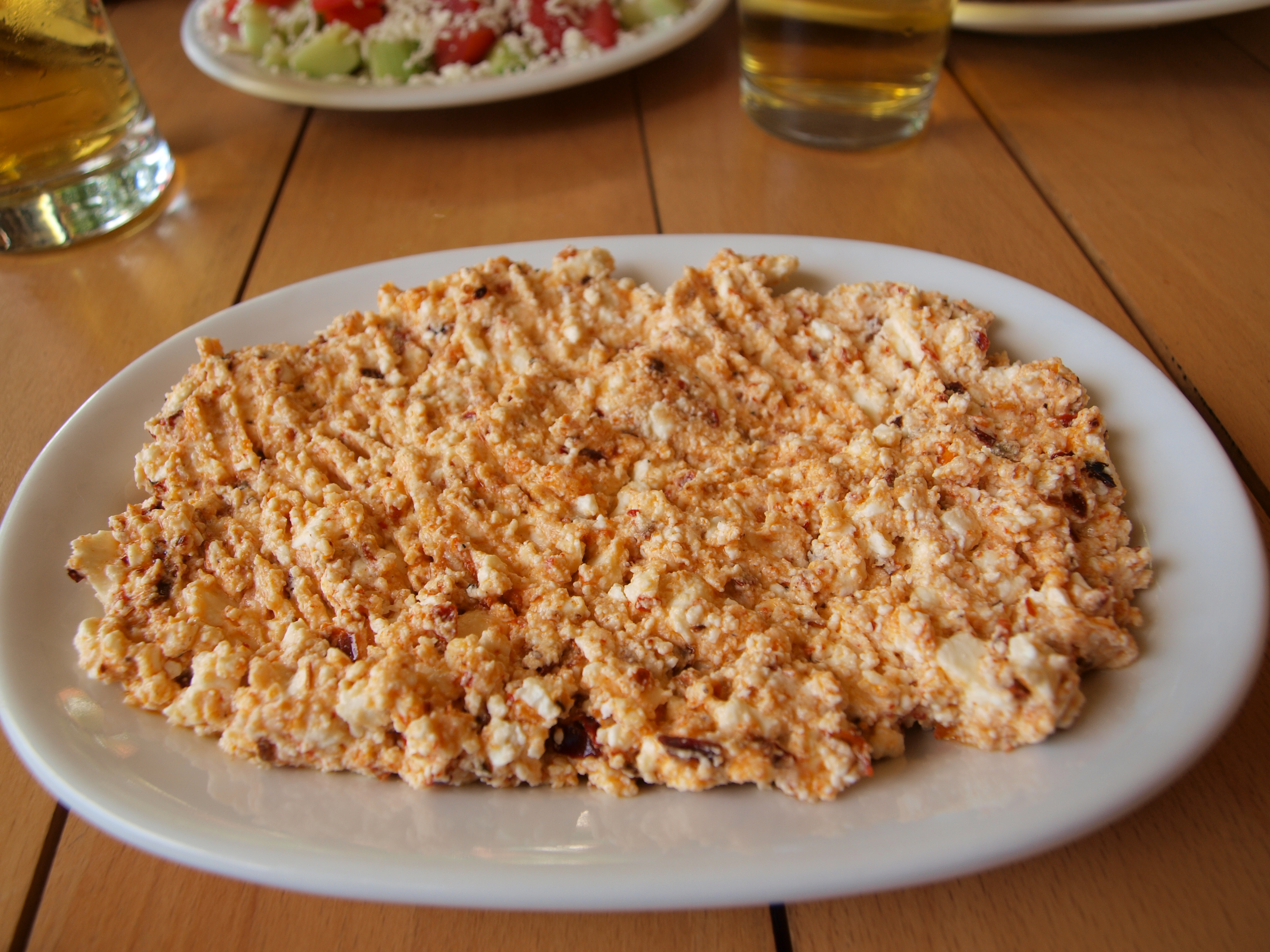
- Type: Salad
- Place of origin: Serbia
- Main ingredients: White cheese, hot chili peppers, salt and other spices

Urnebes (Serbian Cyrillic: Урнебес, pronounced [ˈûr̩nebeːs], meaning 'disorder, mess') is a type of spread or salad characteristic of Serbian cuisine, prominent in the city of Niš and southern Serbia. In Serbia, it is common to refer to both dishes consisting primarily of fresh leafy vegetables and thick sauces used as a condiment as salad. It is made of white cheese, kajmak and hot chili peppers, with salt and other spices. In Southern Serbia, it is made with chopped peppers, while ground dry peppers (aleva) are used elsewhere, giving it a red color. Depending on the type and amount of peppers, urnebes can range from mild to very hot. Usually, it is served as a side dish with grilled meat or barbecue. Sometimes garlic is used.

== See also ==
- Liptauer
- List of salads
- Serbian cuisine
