= Spread (food) =

Food that is spread onto bread

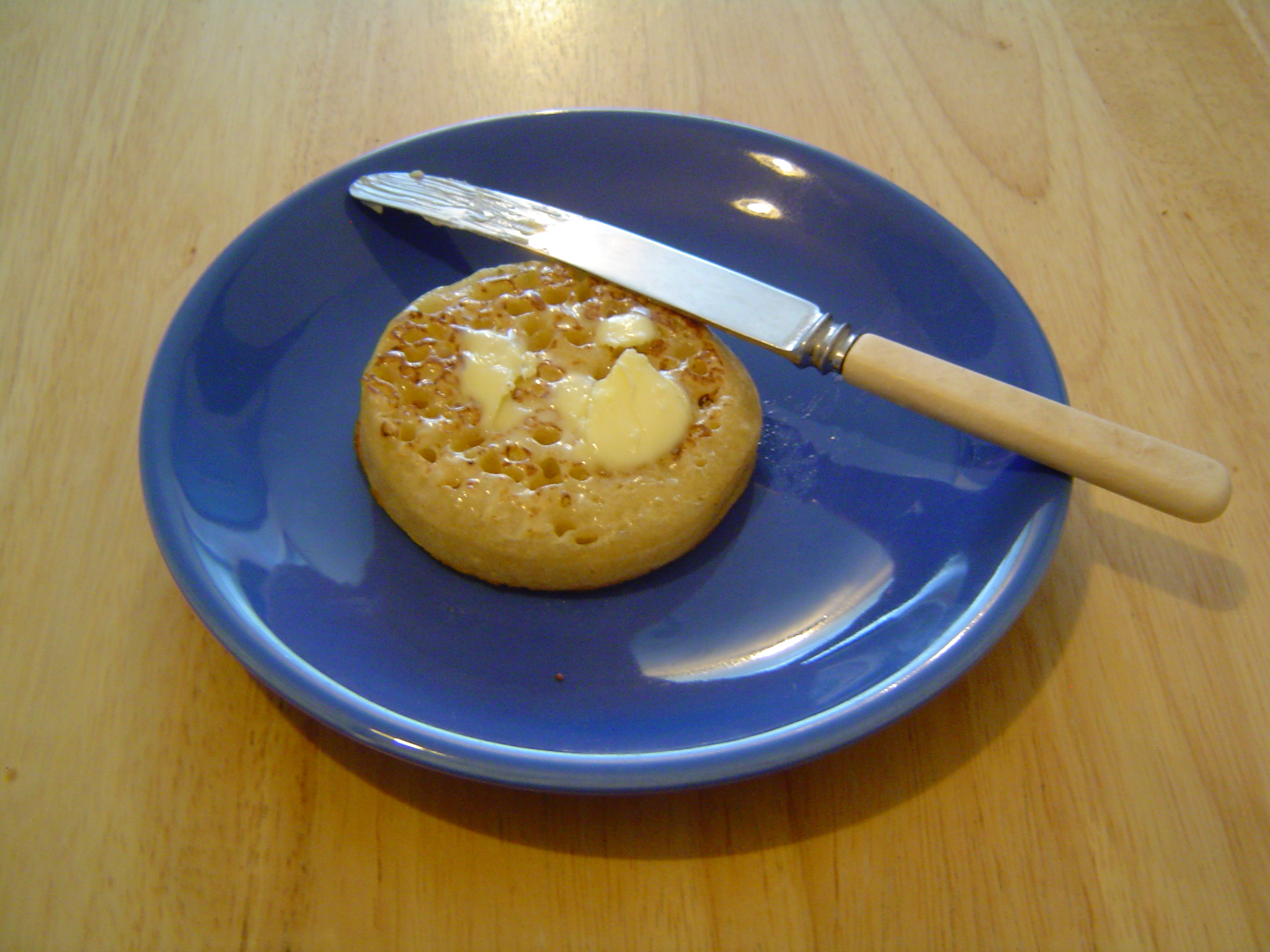
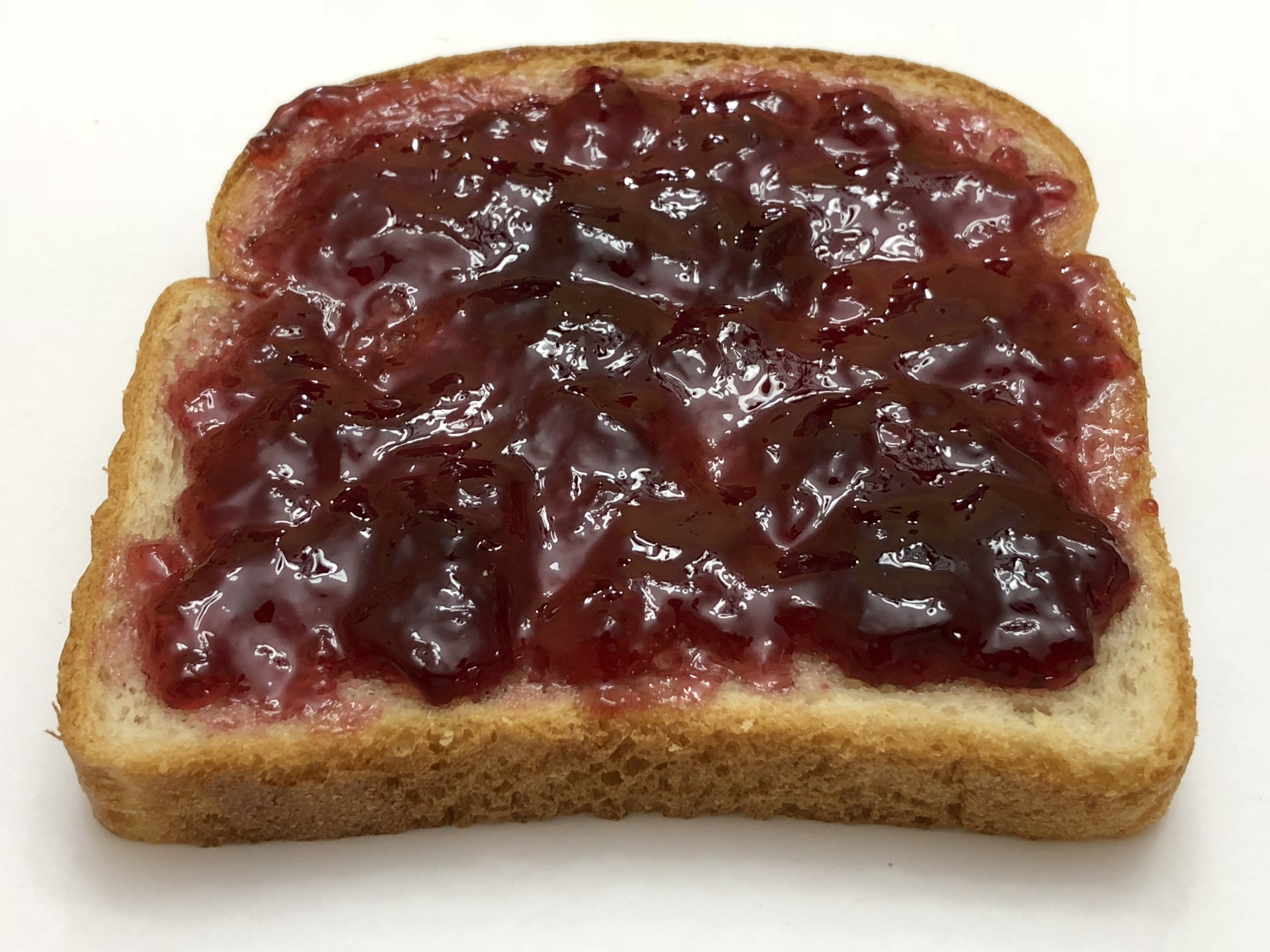
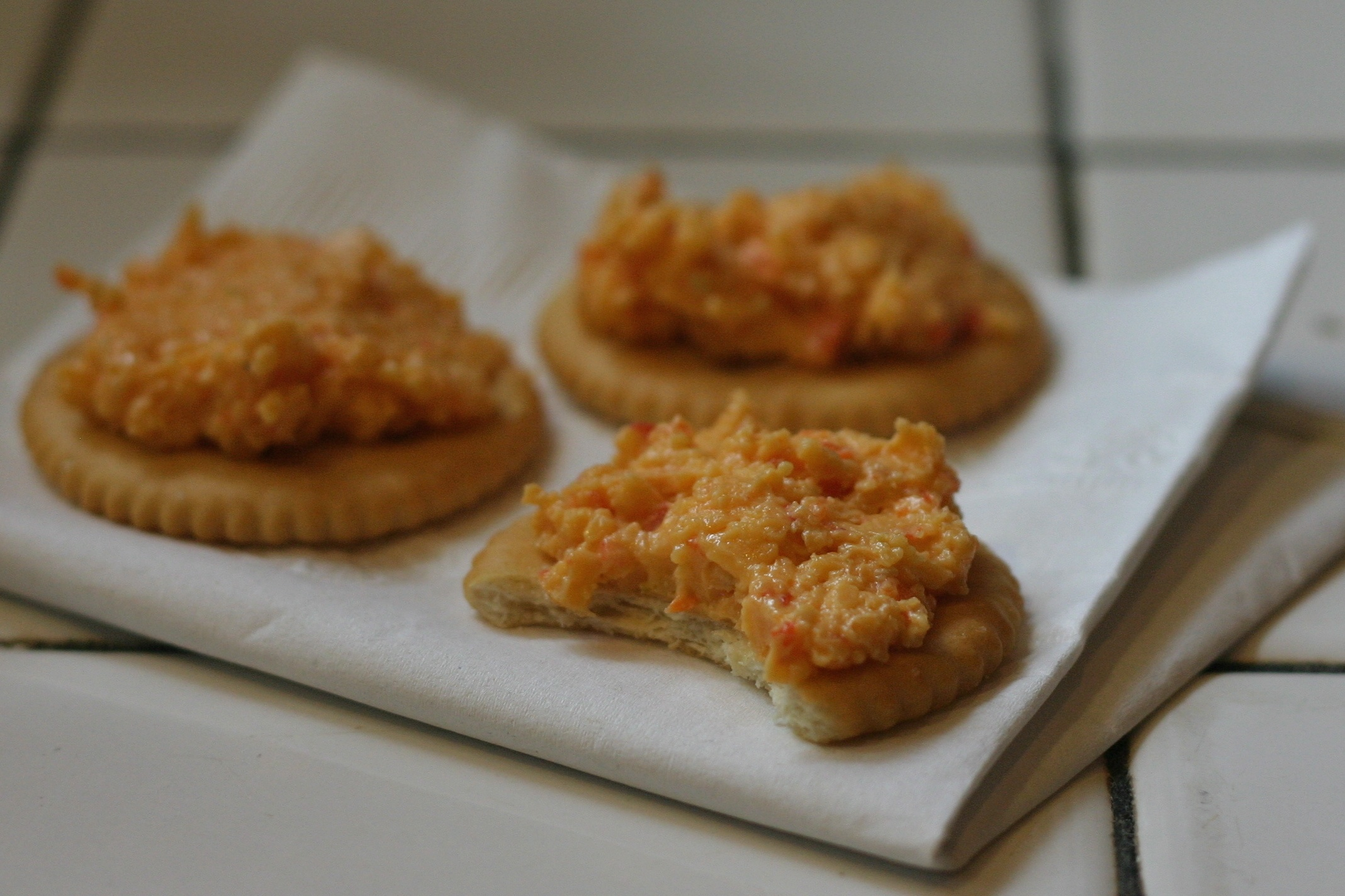
Various kinds of spread. In order (left to right, top to bottom): butter, grape jelly, pimento cheese and liver pâté.

A spread is a food that is spread, generally with a knife, onto foods such as bread or crackers. Spreads are added to food to enhance the flavor or texture of the food, which may be considered bland without it. Butter and soft cheeses are typical spreads.

A sandwich spread is a spreadable condiment used in a sandwich, in addition to more solid ingredients. Butter, mayonnaise, prepared mustard, and ketchup are typical sandwich spreads, along with their variants such as Thousand Island dressing, tartar sauce, and Russian dressing. Sandwich spreads such as butter are used to add flavor and moisture, and also to separate the bread from fillings which may make it soggy.

Spreads are different from dips, such as salsa, which are generally not applied to spread onto food but have food dipped into them instead.

Common spreads include dairy spreads (such as cheeses, creams, and butters, although the term "butter" is broadly applied to many spreads), margarines, honey, nut-based spreads (peanut/cashew/hazelnut butter, Nutella), plant-derived spreads (such as jams, jellies, and hummus), yeast spreads (such as Vegemite and Marmite), roe spreads (such as caviar and mentaiko paste), and meat-based spreads (such as pâté, liver spread and some potted meat products).

== See also ==
- Cheese spread
- List of spreads
- List of dips
- Lists of foods
- Peanut butter
- Shortening
