= Neufchâtel cheese =

French soft cheese

French Neufchâtel
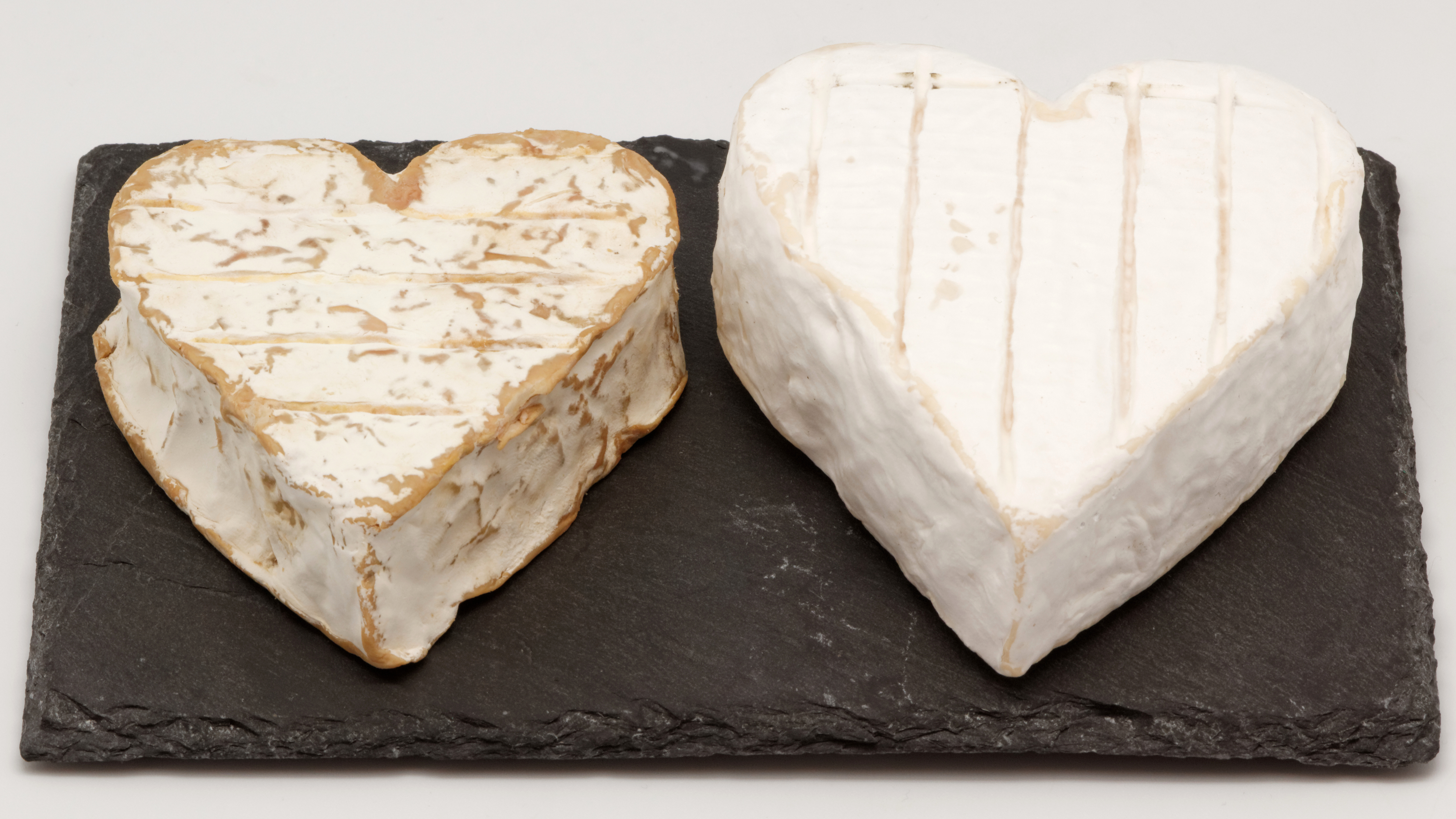
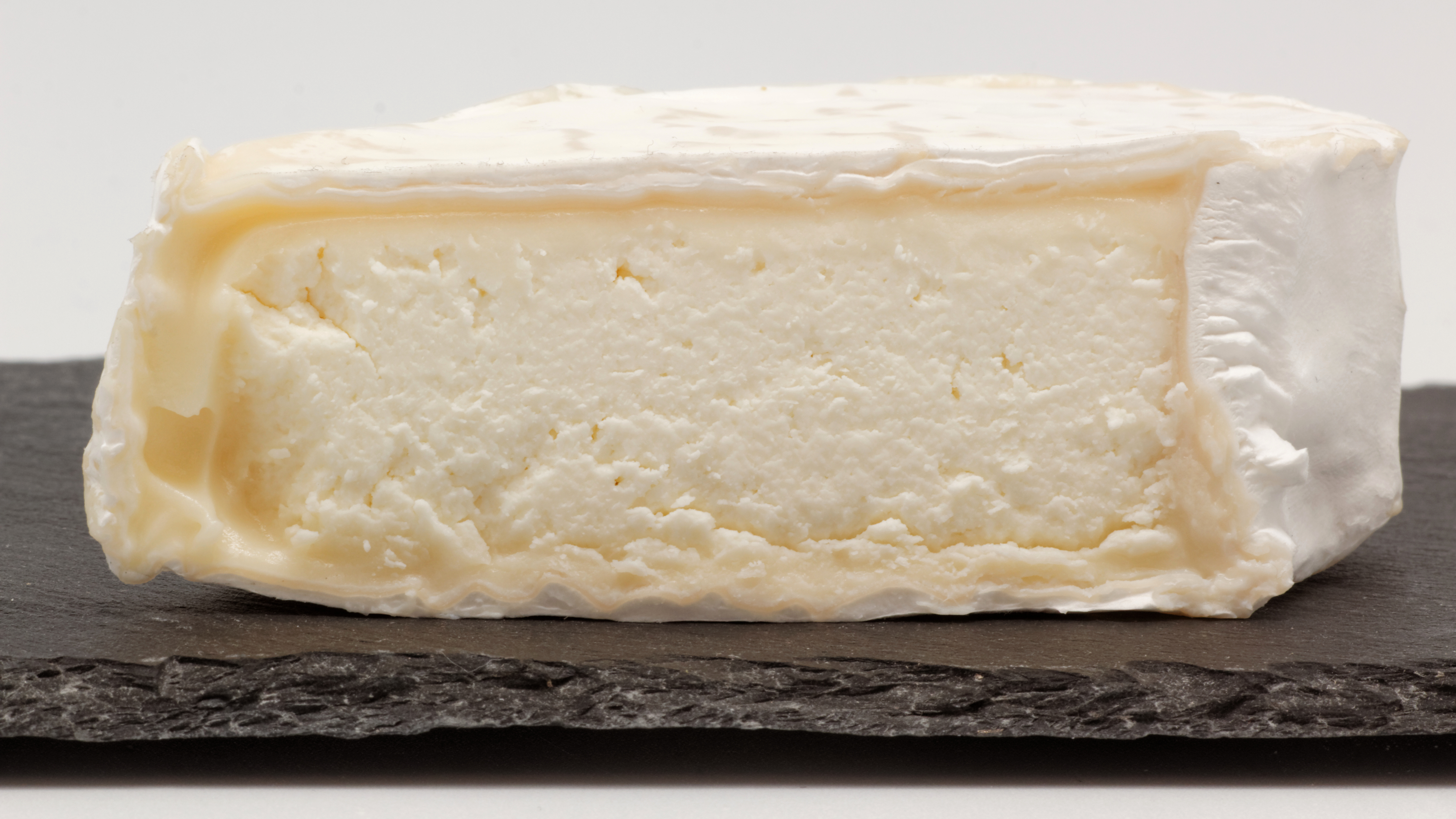
- French Neufchâtel in a heart shape Texture of French Neufchâtel
- Country of origin: France
- Region: Normandy
- Town: Neufchâtel-en-Bray
- Source of milk: Cows milk
- Pasteurized: sometimes
- Texture: Soft
- Aging time: 8–10 weeks
- Certification: AOC, 1969

Neufchâtel (French: [nøʃɑtɛl], [nœfʃɑtɛl]; Norman: Neu(f)câtel) is a soft, slightly crumbly, mold-ripened, bloomy-rind cheese made in the Neufchâtel-en-Bray region of Normandy. One of the oldest kinds of cheese in France, its production is believed to date back as far as the 6th century AD, in the Kingdom of the Franks. It looks similar to Camembert and Brie, with a dry, white, edible rind, but the taste is saltier and sharper. Unlike other soft, white-rinded cheeses, Neufchâtel has a grainy texture. It is usually sold in heart shapes, but is also produced in other forms, such as logs and boxes. It is typically matured for 8–10 weeks and weighs around 100–600 g (3.5–21.2 oz).

This AOC product should not be confused with the American version of the cheese, which is a factory-manufactured lower-fat, higher-moisture-content, unaged alternative to American cream cheese.

== History ==
Neufchâtel is among the oldest of the Norman cheeses, having likely been made as early as the sixth century, and known to have been made between 1050 and 1543. For the end-of-year festivals during the Hundred Years' War, stories say that young girls offered heart-shaped cheeses to English soldiers to show their affection. During the 17th century, it was sent to Paris and Rouen, and exported to Great Britain.

In 1880, Isidore Lefebvre, a farmer, constructed a dairy in Nesle-Hodeng, where he could mould and ripen cheese curds made by farmers in the surrounding area. Among Lefebvre's distributors were such stores as Harrods.

A quality label was granted for Neufchâtel from 1949 to 1953. In 1957, the agricultural assembly of the Neufchâtel district created a federation for protecting the quality of the cheese, working to demand an appellation d'origine contrôlée (AOC, "controlled designation of origin"). This was put into law May 3, 1969, and modified December 29, 1986. The AOC was reviewed again in 2006 under higher scrutiny, requiring that 60% of a manufacturer's cows be of the Normande breed.

Production of the cheese decreased after World War II. In 1993, 31 farms and one factory were producing 45% of all Neufchâtel.

== Shapes ==
The six different shapes of Neufchâtel are:

- Carré (square-shaped), (100 g)
- Briquette (brick-shaped), (100 g)
- Bondon or bonde (bung or plug-shaped), (100 g)
- Cœur (heart-shaped), (200 g)
- Double bonde (double plug-shaped, twice the weight of a bondon), (400 g)
- Grand cœur or gros cœur (large, heart-shaped, thrice the weight of a cœur), (600 g)
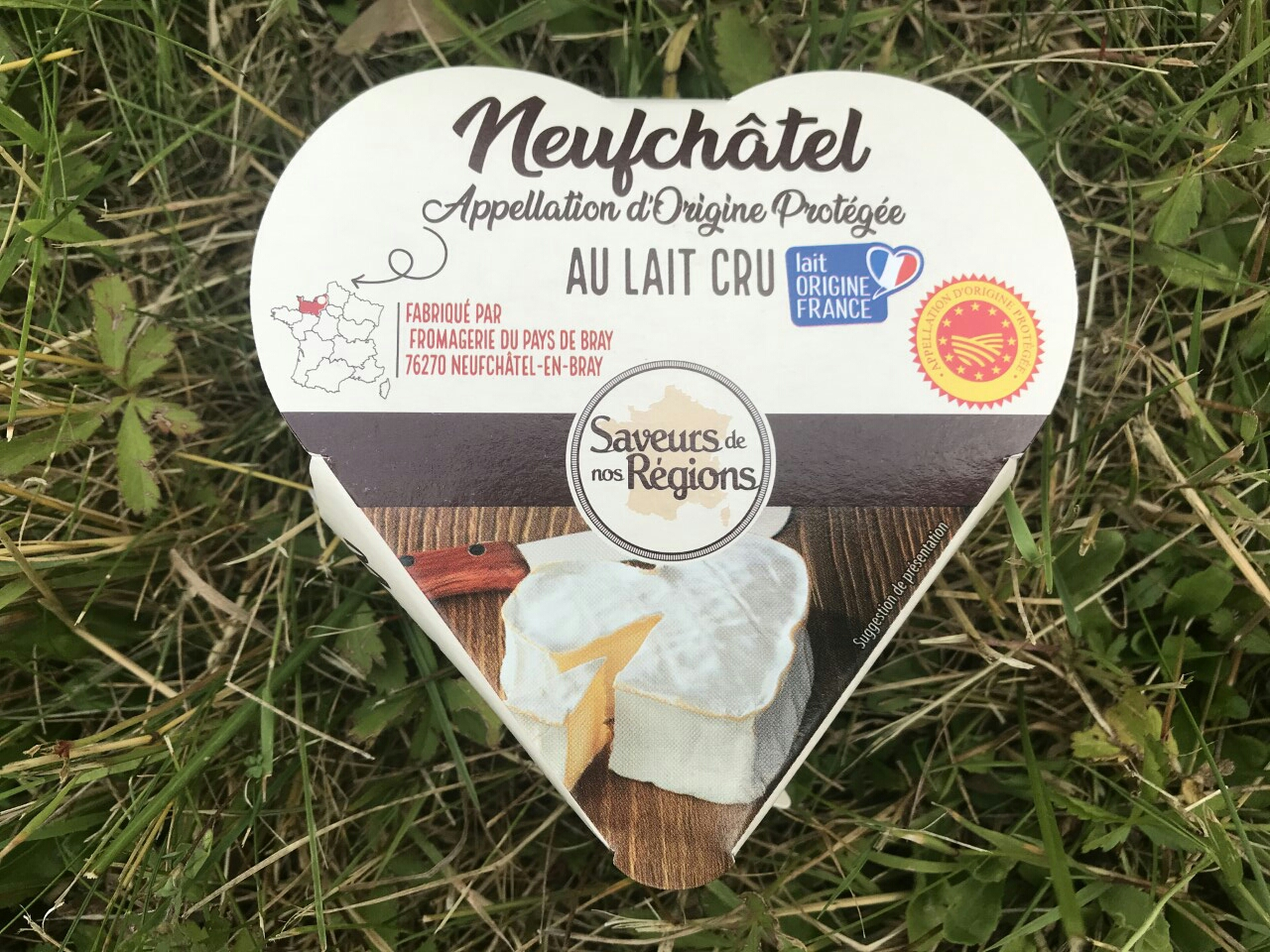
Heart-shaped unpasteurized Neufchâtel in packaging

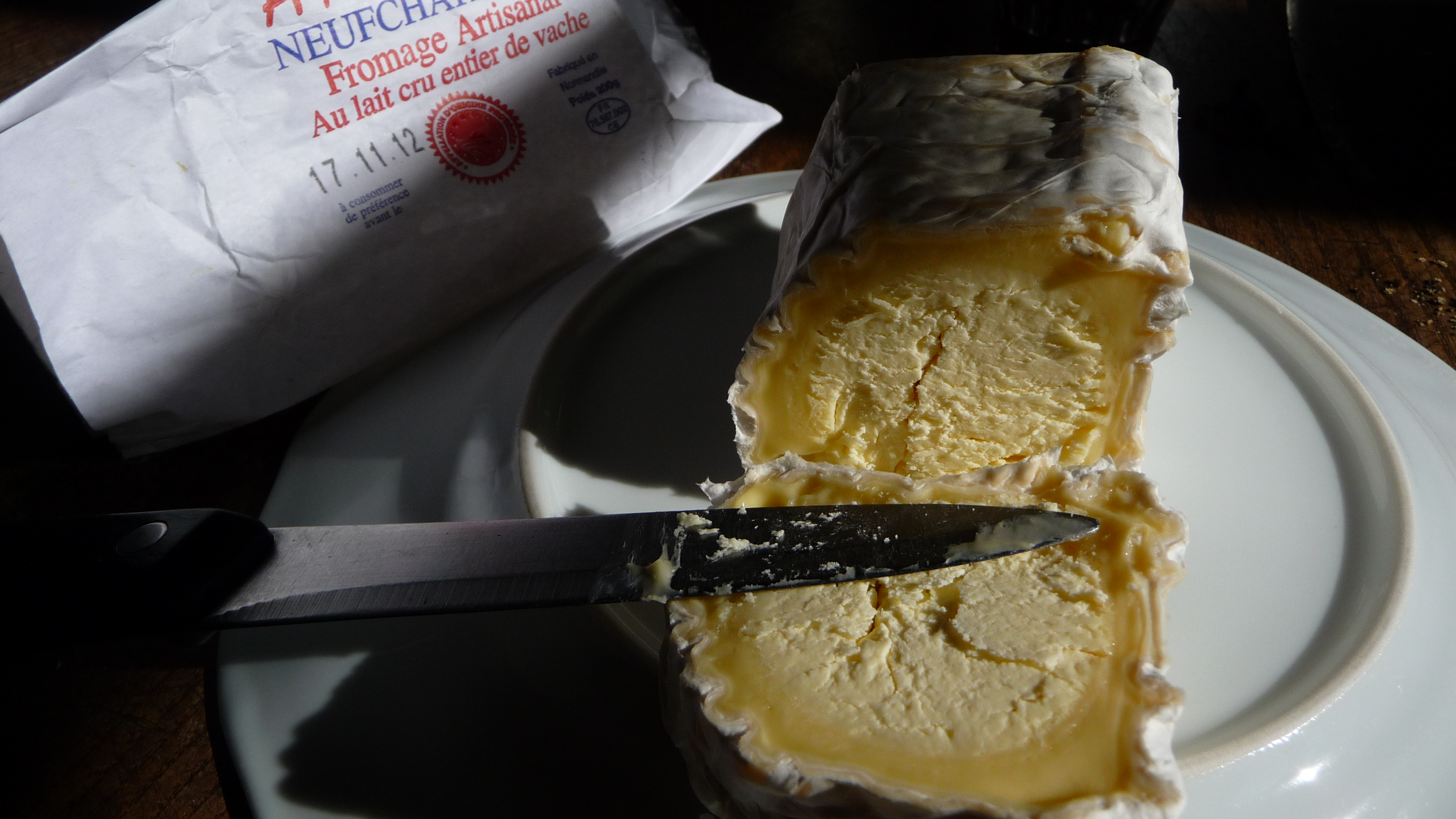
Cross-section of a very well aged cheese

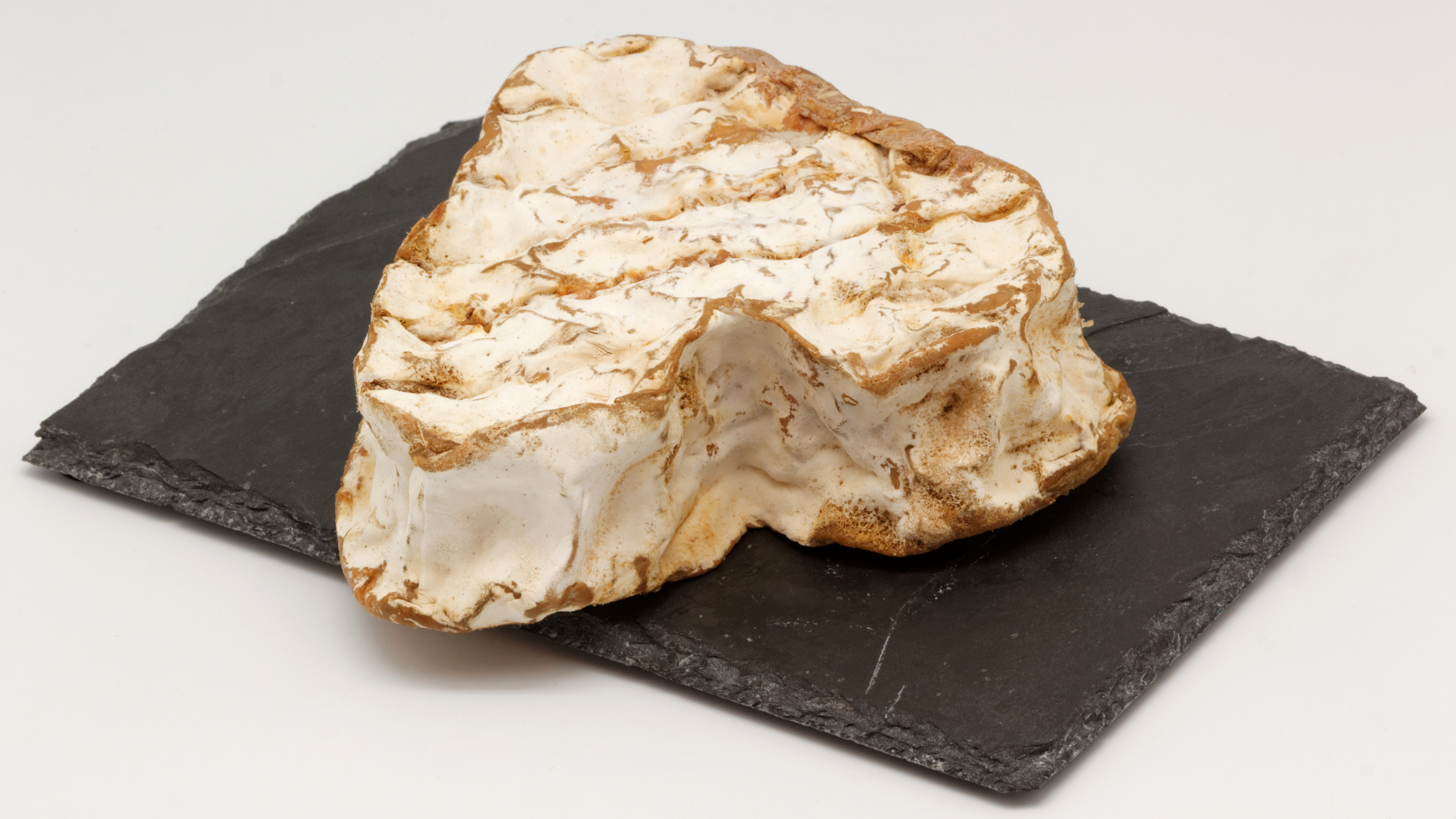
Ripened, heart-shaped Neufchâtel

== American neufchatel ==
In 1872, William Lawrence, a New York dairyman of the town of Chester, created the first American cream cheese as the result of adding cream to a traditional recipe for Neufchâtel.

American neufchatel is softer than regular cream cheese due to its roughly one-third lower fat and higher moisture content. Due to this reduced fat content, it is found in most grocery stores as a reduced-fat alternative to cream cheese. In the U.S., plain neufchatel cheese is typically sold in brick-like shapes, which are wrapped in foil and sold in paperboard boxes.

== See also ==
- List of cheeses
