= Cream cheese =

Soft, mild-tasting cheese with a high fat content

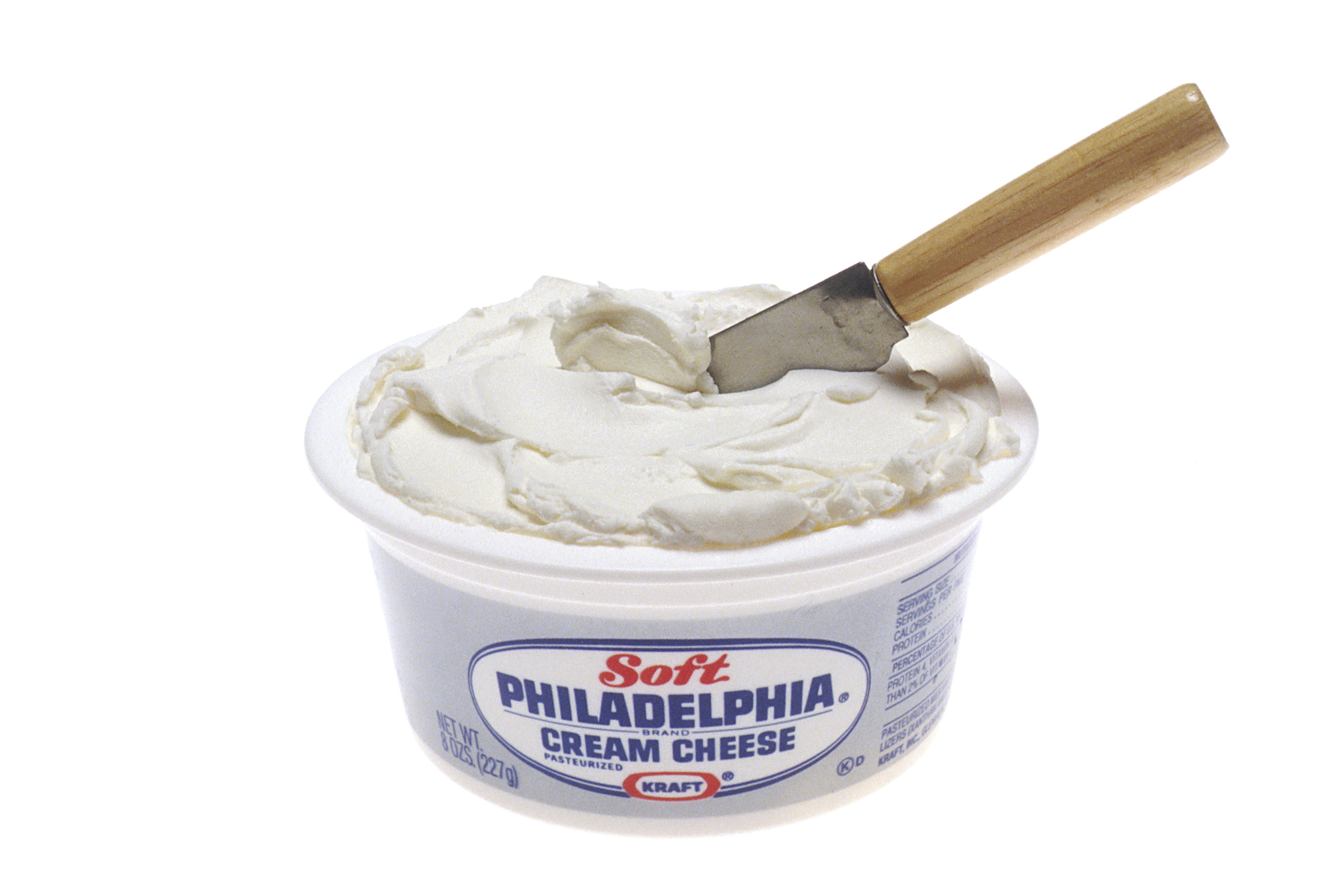
- A tub of Philadelphia brand cream cheese
- Country of origin: United States
- Pasteurized: Yes
- Texture: Soft
- Aging time: None

Cream cheese in the United States
Nutritional value per 100 g (3.5 oz)
- Energy: 1,431 kJ (342 kcal)
- Carbohydrates: 4 g
- Fat: 34 g
- Saturated: 19 g
- Monounsaturated: 9 g
- Polyunsaturated: 1 g
- Protein: 6 g
Vitamins and minerals
Minerals	Quantity %DV^{†}
Calcium	8% 98 mg
- Other constituents: Quantity
- Cholesterol: 110 mg
- Fat percentage can vary.
- ^{†}Percentages estimated using US recommendations for adults.

Cream cheese is a soft, usually mild-tasting fresh cheese made from milk and cream. Cream cheese is not naturally matured and is meant to be consumed fresh, so it differs from other soft cheeses, such as Brie and Neufchâtel. It is more comparable in taste, texture, and production methods to Boursin and mascarpone. Stabilizers, such as carob bean gum and carrageenan, are often added in industrial production. It can also come in several flavors.

The U.S. Food and Drug Administration defines cream cheese as containing at least 33% milk fat with a moisture content of not more than 55%, and a pH range of 4.4 to 4.9. Similarly, under Canadian Food and Drug Regulations, cream cheese must contain at least 30% milk fat and a maximum of 55% moisture. In other countries, it is defined differently and may need a considerably higher fat content.

Cream cheese originated in the United States in the 1870s.

== Origin ==
Around 1873, William A. Lawrence, a dairyman in Chester, New York, was the first to mass produce an unripened fresh cheese known generically as cream cheese. In 1872, he began manufacturing a Neufchâtel cheese style. By adding cream to the process, he developed a richer cheese that he called "cream cheese". In 1877, Lawrence created the first brand of cream cheese; its logo was a silhouette of a cow followed by the words "Neufchatel & Cream Cheese".

In 1879, to build a larger factory, Lawrence entered into an arrangement with Samuel S. Durland, another Chester merchant. In 1880, Alvah Reynolds, a New York cheese distributor, began to sell the cheese of Lawrence & Durland and called it "Philadelphia Cream Cheese". Histories that imply the cheese was produced in Philadelphia, Pennsylvania, or Philadelphia, New York, are incorrect. By the end of 1880, faced with increasing demand for his Philadelphia-brand cheese, Reynolds turned to Charles Green, a second Chester dairyman, who by 1880 had been manufacturing cream cheese as well. Some of Green's cheese was also sold under the Philadelphia label.

In 1892, Reynolds bought the Empire Cheese Co. of South Edmeston, New York, to produce cheese under his "Philadelphia" label. When the Empire factory burned down in 1900, he asked the newly formed Phenix Cheese Company to produce his cheese, instead. In 1903, Reynolds sold rights to the "Philadelphia" brand name to the Phenix Cheese Company, which was under the direction of Jason F. Whitney Sr. (which later merged with Kraft, in 1928). By the early 1880s, Star cream cheese had emerged as Lawrence & Durland's brand, and Green made World and Globe brands of the cheese. At the turn of the 20th century, New York dairymen were producing cream cheese sold under such other brands as Triple Cream (C. Percival), Eagle (F.X. Baumert), Empire (Phenix Cheese Co.), Mohican (International Cheese Co.), Monroe Cheese Co. (Gross & Hoffman), and Nabob (F.H. Legget).

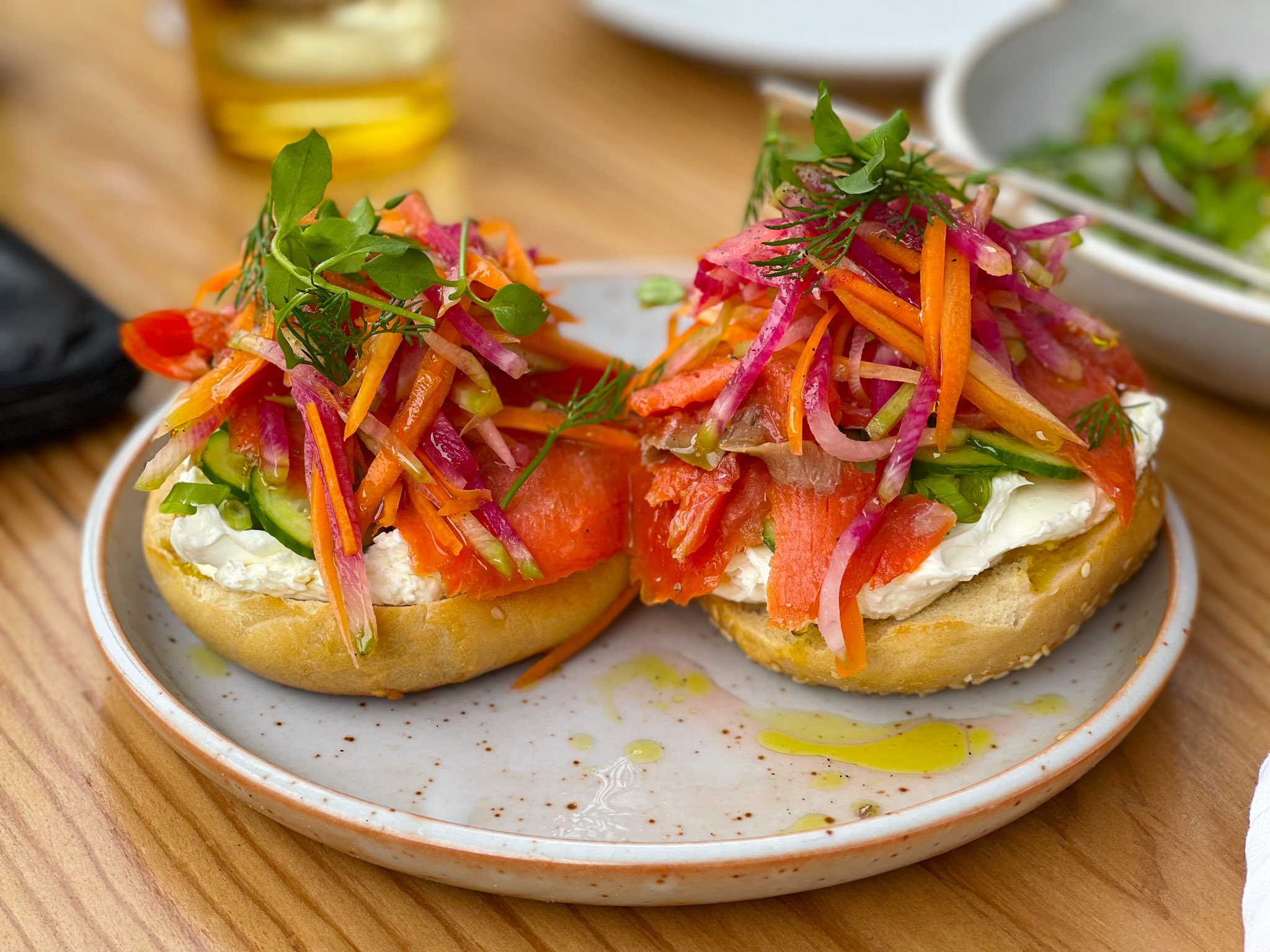
Bagel with cream cheese, salmon, and vegetables

Cream cheese is common in the Ashkenazi Jewish cuisine of New York City. It is the basis of the bagel and cream cheese, an open-faced sandwich. Lox, capers, and other ingredients may be added.

== Manufacture ==
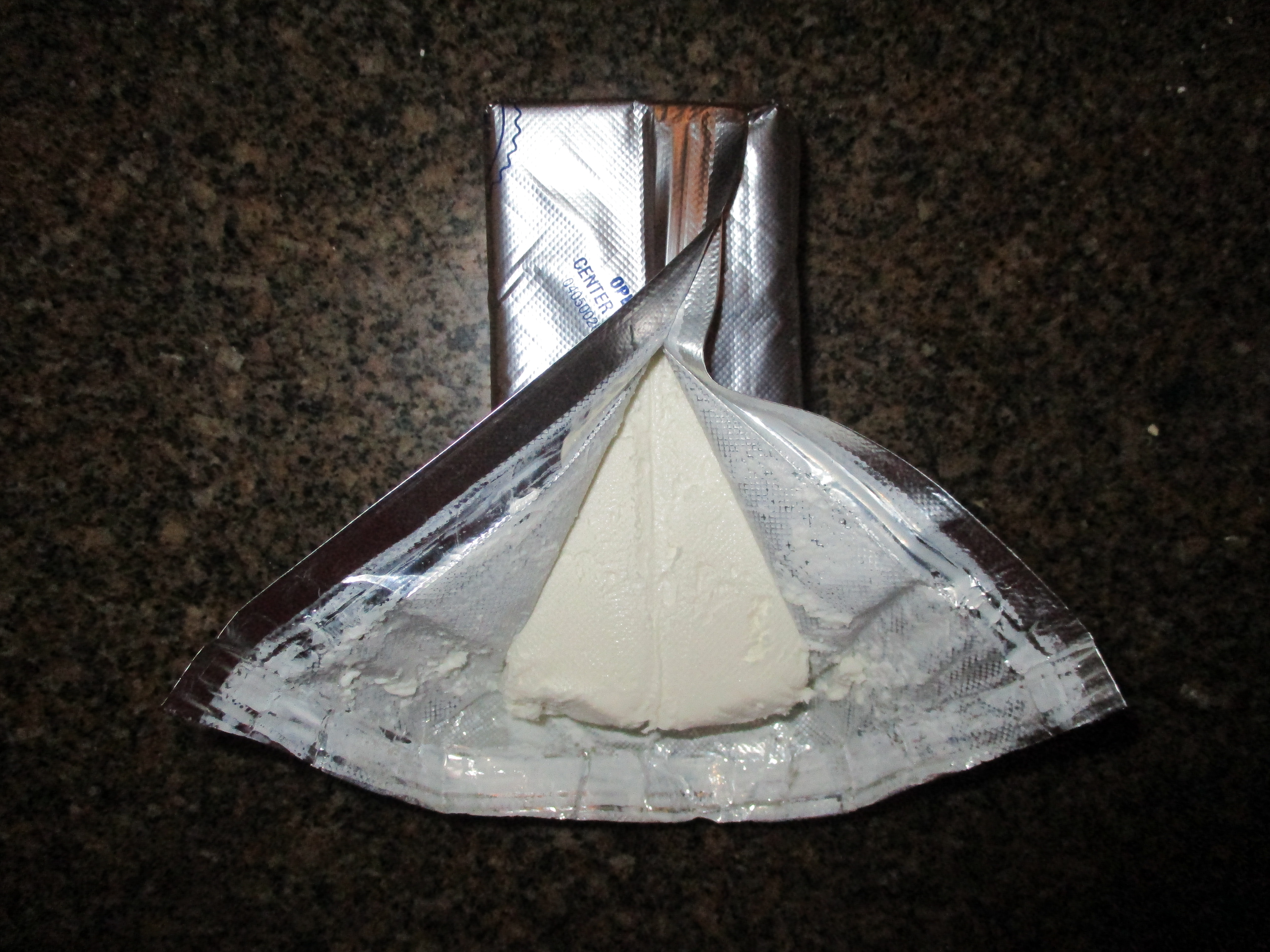
A block of Philadelphia brand cream cheese

Normally, protein molecules in milk have a negative surface charge, which keeps milk in a liquid state; the molecules act as surfactants, forming micelles around the particles of fat and keeping them in emulsion. Lactic acid bacteria are added to pasteurized and homogenized milk. During the fermentation around 22 °C (72 °F), the pH of the blend decreases (acidifies). Amino acids at the surface of the proteins begin losing charge and become neutral, turning the fat micelles from hydrophilic to hydrophobic state and causing the liquid to coagulate. If the bacteria are left in the milk too long, the pH lowers further, the micelles attain a positive charge, and the mixture returns to liquid form. The key, then, is to kill the bacteria by heating the mixture to 52–63 °C (126–145 °F) at the moment the cheese is at the isoelectric point, meaning the state at which half the ionizable surface amino acids of the proteins are positively charged and half are negative.

Inaccurate timing of the heating can produce inferior or unsalable cheese due to variations in flavor and texture. Cream cheese has a higher fat content than other cheeses, and fat repels water, which tends to separate from the cheese; this can be avoided in commercial production by adding stabilizers, such as guar or carob gums, to prolong its shelf life.

In Canada, the regulations for cream cheese stipulate that it be made by coagulating cream with the help of bacteria, forming a curd, which is then formed into a mass after removing the whey. Some of its ingredients include cream (to adjust milk fat content), salt, nitrogen (to improve spreadability) and several gelling, thickening, stabilizing, and emulsifying ingredients such as xanthan gum or gelatin, to a maximum of 0.5%. Regulations on preservatives used are that either sorbic acid or propionic acid may be used independently or combined, but only to a maximum of 3,000 parts per million when used together. The only acceptable enzymes that can be used in manufacturing of cream cheese to be sold in Canada are chymosin A and B, pepsin, and rennet.

In Spain and Mexico, cream cheese is sometimes called by the generic name queso filadelfia, following the marketing of Philadelphia-branded cream cheese by Kraft Foods.

Cream cheese is easy to make at home, and many methods and recipes are used. Consistent, reliable, commercial manufacture is more difficult.

American cream cheese tends to have lower fat content than elsewhere, but "Philadelphia" branded cheese is suggested as a substitute for petit suisse by Julia Child.

== See also ==
- List of spreads
