= John Peterman =

American entrepreneur

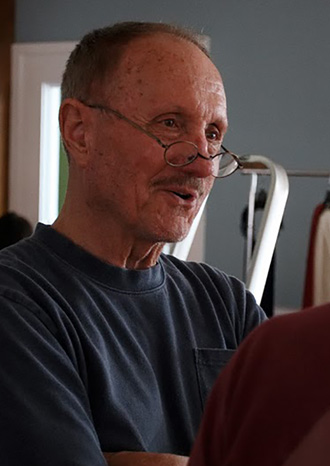
- Born: 29 January 1941 (age 85); West Nyack, New York, U.S.
- Education: College of the Holy Cross (BS)
- Occupations: Founder, Chairman of J. Peterman Company
- Years active: 1987–2000, 2001–present
- Known for: Founding the J. Peterman Company; Being fictionalized in the TV series Seinfeld
- Notable work: Peterman Rides Again
- Spouse: Audrey Peterman (m. 1964)
- Children: 4
- Parent(s): Charles Peterman, Sally Peterman
- Website: jpeterman.com

John Peterman (born 29 January 1941) is an American catalog and retail entrepreneur from Lexington, Kentucky, who operates the J. Peterman Company. He grew up in West Nyack, New York, as the son of a banker and secretary. He is known for founding the J. Peterman Company after finding a cowboy duster on a business trip. He is also known for being fictionalized in the TV series Seinfeld. Peterman was also a Minor League Baseball player, Kentucky rancher, and author.

== Early life ==
Peterman was the third of four children born to Charles and Sally Peterman. He had two brothers and a sister. Charles Peterman became a loan officer and, later, the assistant vice president of the Irving Trust Co. after working his way up from the mailroom. John Peterman grew up in Van Houten Fields, an agrarian commune in West Nyack, New York. Those who were part of the community built their own houses and grew a portion of their own food. Peterman learned to garden, tend chickens, and participate in other physical labor. His mother worked as an administrative assistant after her children started school.

Peterman attended Clarkstown High School and participated in basketball, baseball, and football. He was recognized in the local newspaper for his performance in all three sports. In baseball, he played second base and was voted All-P.S.A.L Baseball first team selection as a second baseman. He graduated from Clarkstown High School in 1960.

== Education and baseball career ==
Peterman graduated from the College of the Holy Cross, in Worcester, Massachusetts, in 1963 with a Bachelor of Science in economics. He played third base on the Holy Cross Crusaders baseball team that went to the College World Series in 1962 and 1963. As a junior in 1962, he had a .362 batting average, and as a senior in 1963, he had a .291 batting average and led his team with 17 runs batted in.

He also played minor-league baseball for the Pittsburgh Pirates organization for two seasons as a second baseman. In 1963, Peterman had a one-day tryout with the New York Yankees at Yankee Stadium where he played next to Mickey Mantle, Roger Maris, and Tony Kubek, but did not sign with the team. His baseball career ended in his early 20s after a leg injury.

== Business career ==
=== Sales ===
Peterman had a career in sales for 20 years after his baseball career ended. He worked as a regional sales manager in Kentucky, Tennessee, and Alabama for General Foods (now Kraft Heinz) and Castle & Cooke. During his time in sales, Peterman sold dog food, cereal, pineapple, tuna fish, and inspirational tapes. In 1981, he was managing fertilizer accounts but was dismissed.

=== Corporate consultant ===
Peterman became a corporate consultant after deciding "that was the first and last time I was going to be fired." As a corporate specialty-foods sales consultant, he helped people make deals with other companies, and it allowed him to travel. During a meeting to help a client find an advertising company, Peterman met Donald Staley and they began to work closely together. They agreed to collaborate on any entrepreneurial ideas they envisioned, which led to several businesses.

=== Entrepreneur ===
Together, Peterman and Staley started a mail-order company to heal sick houseplants as well as a manufacturing business making beer cheese; both were successful. The beer cheese business was originally Hall's Beer Cheese and Peterman bought half the company. While he was selling beer cheese, he found a horseman's duster that would propel him into the retail business. The beer cheese was being sold downstairs and the retail business was upstairs until Hall's was eventually sold.

=== J. Peterman Company ===
In 1986, Peterman was on a business trip in Denver, Colorado, and decided to explore Wyoming. He went to Jackson Hole and bought a horseman's duster because he liked it. After wearing it consistently, he and his friend Staley decided to sell more of the coats, putting an advertisement in The New Yorker. That led to the sale of about 70 coats and the J. Peterman Company was created. In late 1988, the company's first catalog was published, with black and white drawings and a literary copy style. Color illustrations were introduced to the catalog in 1989.

Peterman found unique items to sell in the catalog and Staley wrote the product descriptions. Bob Hagel was the first J. Peterman Co. illustrator and art director. He made the decision to draw and paint the clothes from the catalog without bodies, so they appeared like "well-traveled ghosts." The catalog drew the attention of celebrities like Oprah Winfrey, Clint Eastwood, and Tom Hanks. The company continued to grow and, in 1995, the TV show Seinfeld debuted J. Peterman as a character played by John O'Hurley. After the character's first appearance, Peterman agreed with Seinfeld's lawyers that he would approve the scripts in which his fictional part had a role. The J. Peterman Co. also sold movie replicas of the "Heart of The Ocean" necklace from the 1997 film Titanic. The company sold $1 million worth of necklace replicas along with other costume and prop replicas.

The J. Peterman Co. was unable to sustain its rapid growth and, in 1999, the company filed for Chapter 11 bankruptcy, and was bought by Paul Harris Stores. However, in 2000, Paul Harris Stores went bankrupt and Peterman was able to buy back his namesake brand. The J. Peterman Company catalog was relaunched and Tim Peterman, John Peterman's son, was the CEO of J. Peterman Company until 2014. As of 2018, the president of the J. Peterman Company was Kyle Foster. The company developed Peterman's Eye, a social networking site, and an online catalog that offers mail-order inventory, as well as unique antiques.

== Personal life ==
Peterman was married to his wife, Audrey (née Aramini, born to Ann and Albert Aramini) in 1964. They have four children: Robyn, Sean, Timothy, and Matthew. Peterman's daughter Robyn Peterman Zahn, a writer and former actress, is married to the actor Steve Zahn. They have two children, Henry James Zahn and Audrey Clair Zahn. Sean was a cattle and grain farmer until he was killed July 23, 2015, in a farming accident in Lexington, Kentucky. Tim Peterman was CEO of J. Peterman Company from 2008 until 2014, and helped build the company's web presence. Around 2014, Matt Peterman started working at the J. Peterman Company as Creative Director after spending time in Los Angeles, California, in the film business.

Peterman owns a cabin on a 550-acre parcel of land in Lexington, Kentucky, that was formerly farmed by his son Sean.

In 2001, Peterman presented a lecture titled "The Painful but Essential Art of Failing" at his alma mater, College of the Holy Cross.

== Works ==
After the J. Peterman Company filed for bankruptcy and was bought by Paul Harris Stores, Peterman wrote a book, Peterman Rides Again, a 2000 memoir that explores his life from his early baseball career to finding products for the catalog while traveling. It also chronicles the rise and fall of the J. Peterman Company and Peterman's lessons in entrepreneurship. The book was published November 6, 2000, and has 225 pages.

== Seinfeld caricature ==
Peterman was fictionalized in the TV sitcom Seinfeld, played by John O'Hurley, as Elaine Benes' (Julia Louis-Dreyfus) boss in the last three seasons. O'Hurley has said that his distinctive manner of speaking as the character was inspired by "'40s radio drama, combined with a bit of a bad Charles Kuralt."
