= Hall's Beer Cheese =

American dairy product

Hall's Snappy Beer Cheese
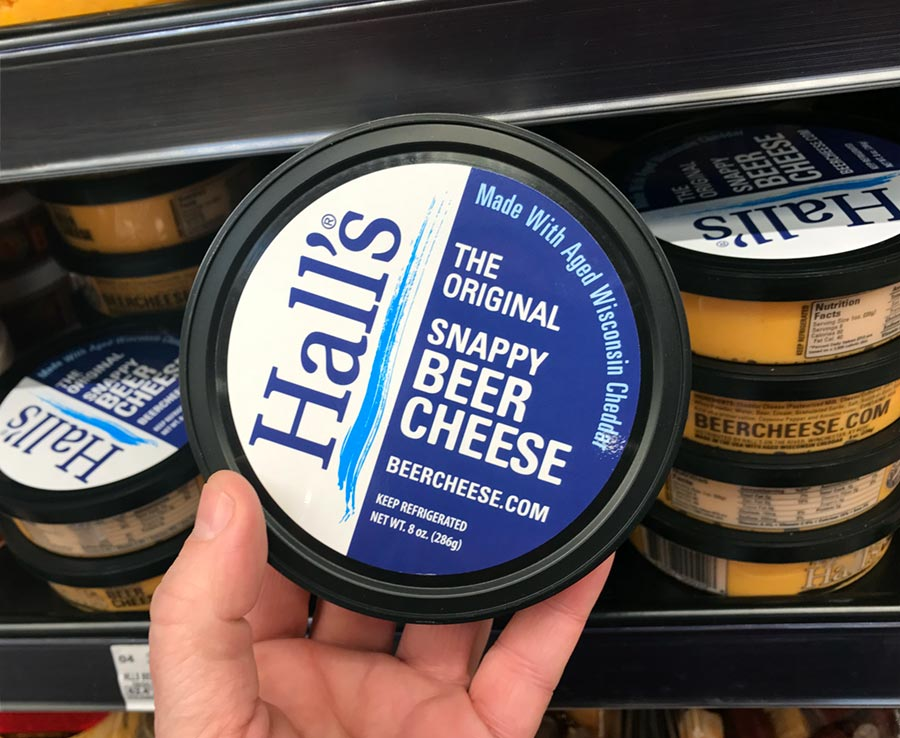
- Hall's Beer Cheese 8-ounce (230 g) tub on a grocery store shelf
- Type: Beer cheese
- Inception: 1965
- Manufacturer: Halls on the River Restaurant, Winchester, Kentucky, U.S.
- Website: beercheese.com

Hall's Beer Cheese, is a beer cheese spread made in central Kentucky since the 1960s. The name comes from Hall's on the River, a Winchester, Kentucky restaurant that popularized the item.

== Awards and recognition ==
- People's Choice Winner at the 2016 Annual Beer Cheese Festival.
- Best Beer Cheese award at the 2015 Annual Beer Cheese Festival.

== See also ==
- List of spreads
