= List of Pair of Kings episodes =

Pair of Kings is an American television sitcom that premiered on the Disney XD cable channel on September 10, 2010. This list of episodes is organized by premiere date in the US. The series revolves around a pair of hapless Chicagoan teens (Mitchel Musso, Doc Shaw) who are the heirs to the throne of a fictitious Pacific island called Kinkow. In the third and final season, one of the brothers leaves the show (Mitchel Musso), replaced by Boz (Adam Hicks), a long-lost brother of the original two that was raised by monkeys.

== Series overview ==
Season	Episodes	Originally released	
Season	Episodes	First released	Last released
1	20	September 10, 2010	May 2, 2011
2	25	June 13, 2011	April 16, 2012
3	22	June 18, 2012	February 18, 2013

== Episodes ==
=== Season 1 (2010–11) ===
No. overall	No. in season	Title	Directed by	Written by	Original release date	Prod. code
1	1	"Return of the Kings"	Linda Mendoza	Dan Cross & David Hoge	September 10, 2010	101–102
Brady (Mitchel Musso) and Boomer (Doc Shaw) are twin teenagers living in Chicago with their aunt Nancy and uncle Bill, as their parents are deceased. Brady and Boomer are unaware that they are destined to become the next kings of an island nation known as Kinkow. After they are bullied by the toughest guys in their high school, Mason (Geno Segers) and a group of warriors from Kinkow come to bring them home. Brady and Boomer break the island's sacred ruby, causing Kinkow's volcano to erupt. Their evil cousin Lanny (Ryan Ochoa) tricks them into going to get another sacred ruby so they would die on the dark side of Kinkow, allowing him to become king. While they are on the dark side, Brady and Boomer are caught by a tribe called the Tarantula People, but they are protected by the bat medallion that the Tarantula People obey. Brady and Boomer obtain the sister ruby and save the kingdom. However, the chain that controlled the Tarantula People falls off Brady's neck. Special guest star: Tichina Arnold as Aunt Nancy; Guest stars: John Eric Bentley as Uncle Bill, Maxie J. Santillan as Stately Islander, Matthew Willig as Tarantula Leader, Vincent Pastore as the voice of Yamakoshi, Gragory Pugliese as Rondo; Short appearances: Clint Culp as Coach Note: This is a one-hour special and later was divided in two parts. This episode was first shown on Disney Channel on September 10, 2010. Its preview on Disney Channel received 4.1 million viewers, marking the biggest audience, to date, for the premiere of a Disney XD Original Series.
2	2	"Beach Bully Bingo"	David Kendall	Matt Wickline	September 22, 2010	105
Brady and Boomer are banned from Shredder Beach by the top surfer who is known as "The Big Kahula", also known as Hibachi. After being banned from the beach, they return and make a bet with Hibachi that they will beat him in a surf competition and take back the beach. Hibachi states that if he wins, then no one will be able to surf on the island ever again except him and his friends. Brady and Boomer enlist in a boot camp run by Mason, who attempts to train them so they can learn how to surf, and take the beach back. Mason was formerly the top surfer, but was beaten by Hibachi 10 years earlier, because he was blinded by what he assumed to be the sun. Brady and Boomer train and take on Hibachi, while Mason's daughter Mikayla (Kelsey Chow) decides to keep an eye on Hibachi's friends. She discovers that they were trying to cheat by shining light from the sun into the eyes of Brady and Boomer by using a reflective shell. She puts the ones responsible to sleep with darts. Brady and Boomer win the competition, and Mikayla tells her father that Hibachi tried to blind them, and that is why Mason previously lost to him. Hibachi then runs away. Brady and Boomer declare Mason the new "Big Kahula" making him the top surfer of Shredder Beach. Guest stars: Martin Klebba as Hibachi and Kyle Benton as Marvin
3	3	"A Mermaid's Tail"	Andy Cadiff	Donald Beck	September 29, 2010	104
The two kings find five beautiful mermaids on the beach and bring them to the castle to turn them into human princesses of the castle. Things go bad when the mermaids were actually seducing the kings to take over the castle, and they also turn Mikayla into a mermaid and cause her to talk in dolphin chirps. Meanwhile, Lanny falls in love with Amazonia, one of the mermaids, who also responds to Lanny. They successfully turn all the mermaids back to normal, much to the sadness of Lanny. Late at night, Lanny calls out to Amazonia from outside the castle, much to the chagrin of Aerosol who wants him to stop. Amazonia says, "I don't want him to stop!" Guest stars: Leslie Anne Huff as Aerosol, Madison Riley as Amazonia
4	4	"Where the Wild Kings Are"	Victor Gonzalez	Kenny Smith	October 6, 2010	107
Brady and Boomer find a cute creature in the jungle and decide to keep it as a pet, despite Mason's warnings. Lanny calls him a "Giant Armpit". It starts off well, but gets worse when they start neglecting it and turns into a large beast, kidnapping the kings in the process. Meanwhile, Lanny hypnotises the talentless court jester to kill the kings, but his plan fails. Guest star: John O'Hurley as CD instructor Absent: Kelsey Chow as Mikayla
5	5	"Big Kings on Campus"	Leonard R. Garner, Jr.	Dave Polsky	October 13, 2010	108
Despite being kings, Brady and Boomer are still required to attend school on Kinkow, but they are reluctant to do so. Brady gets jealous when Mikayla starts hanging out with her school friend Tristan, who is into extreme sports and has survived animal attacks. To impress her, Brady joins school and tries to do extreme sports. Brady is upset that Mikayla and Tristan sit together at the school's "jaguar table," while he and Boomer must sit with young children at the "meerkat table." Boomer becomes attached with the children. Guest stars: Christoph Sanders as Tristan, Davis Cleveland as Chauncey, Leland Crooke as The Professor and Derek Anthony as Guard Absent: Geno Segers as Mason
6	6	"The Brady Hunch"	Victor Gonzalez	Sean W. Cunningham & Marc Dworkin	October 20, 2010	110
Boomer becomes good friends with a boy from the Flagee clan, a neighboring tribe that Brady begins to suspect are cannibals and want to have Boomer for dinner. Brady devises a plan and attempts to infiltrate the tribe's village, while Mason also starts to believe the cannibal theory. Special guest star: Doug Brochu as Oogie Note: On October 22, 2010 the episode was seen by 3 million viewers when broadcast on Disney Channel marking the second most watched episode of the series, just behind the one-hour episode of the series premiere. Absent: Kelsey Chow as Mikayla
7	7	"Junga Ball"	Victor Gonzalez	Matt Wickline	October 27, 2010	111
Brady and Boomer get ready for the Junga Ball tournament against other islands. Kinkow's team is made up of its guards, with Brady and Boomer as their team leaders. When Boomer does not get to rule the team as much as Brady, Boomer starts his own team with help from Kinkow's resident to challenge Brady. The two teams compete to see which team would represent Kinkow. Absent: Kelsey Chow as Mikayla
8	8	"Revenge of the Mummy"	Adam Weissman	Dan Cross & David Hoge	November 8, 2010	113
The mummy is revived with help from the bat medallion. The mummy causes mayhem and starts hunting Brady and Boomer. The kings try to get the bat medallion back and put the mummy to sleep before Mikayla and Mason find out about the situation. Guest star: Raymond Ochoa, Ryan Ochoa's younger brother, as a Young Boy.
9	9	"Oh Brother, Where Arr Thou?"	Andy Cadiff	Sean W. Cunningham & Marc Dworkin	November 15, 2010	103
Brady and Boomer use a special treasure map to find treasure with the help of a pirate, but the pirates trap the whole gang and plan to steal the palace.
10	10	"No Kings Allowed"	Joel Zwick	Story by : Matt Wickline; Teleplay by : Dan Cross & David Hoge	November 22, 2010	115
Brady and Boomer disguise themselves to join the Riptides, a gang famous for pulling pranks all over the island. For the pranks, Brady and Boomer disguise themselves with wigs. Their final test before they will be accepted into the gang is stealing Yamakoshi: Lanny's talking pet fish. Guest star: Chris Blasman as Hawk and Vincent Pastore as the voice of Yamakoshi Absent: Geno Segers as Mason
11	11	"Pair of Jokers"	Adam Weissman	Donald Beck	November 29, 2010	112
When Brady and Boomer attempt to pull pranks on the villagers, they go too far and a bird named Karma arrives, bringing bad luck to them just as Mikayla had warned.
12	12	"Tone Deaf Jam"	Linda Mendoza	Donald Beck	December 17, 2010 (Disney Channel); April 11, 2011 (Disney XD)	109
For the Harvest Festival, Boomer is excited to sing, thinking he has a great voice but he actually does not. Brady tries to prevent Boomer from being humiliated, but he does not know how to do so without hurting Boomer's feelings. Guest star: Raymond Ochoa as a Young Boy Absent: Geno Segers as Mason
13	13	"Pair of Prom Kings"	Eric Dean Seaton	Sean W. Cunningham & Marc Dworkin	December 17, 2010 (Disney Channel); May 9, 2011 (Disney XD)	120
Brady and Boomer head back to their school prom in Chicago to flaunt their royal status. Boomer chooses a girl named Rebecca, who he thinks he once had a date with; Brady chooses Mikayla, who refuses until he does something noble. Things go haywire when the Tarantula People crash the party. Guest star: Logan Browning as Rebecca "Awesome" Dawson
14	14	"The Bite Stuff"	Victor Gonzalez	Dan Cross & David Hoge	January 17, 2011	106
Brady and Boomer's uncle Bill and aunt Nancy come to visit Kinkow when they think that the island is too dangerous and they must bring the kings home. Before their arrival, Brady gets bitten by a Waka Waka bug, resulting in various side effects that will occur in a chronological order: enlarged ear, bug eyes, amnesia, and limp limbs, before ending with his head transforming into a pumpkin. Brady and Boomer are unsuccessful in getting Brady bitten again, which will reverse the effects. In the process, the boys accidentally topple over rocks that rest upon a burial ground for Tarantula People. The boys later attempt to prove to Bill and Nancy that the island is safe, while hiding Brady's various side effects from them. Tarantula People invade the castle and declare war over their disturbed burial ground, and a Waka Waka bug subsequently invades the castle, before being thrown out by Boomer. Brady, now with a pumpkinhead, scares off the Tarantula People, and Bill and Nancy are convinced that the boys will be fine living with Mason and Mikayla. Brady is later cured. Special guest star: Tichina Arnold as Aunt Nancy Guest star: John Eric Bentley as Uncle Bill
15	15	"Brady Battles Boo-Mer"	Linda Mendoza	Sean W. Cunningham & Marc Dworkin	January 24, 2011	114
Brady tries to get Boomer to believe in ghosts, so he buys a "Ghost in a Can", but Lanny switches the ghost with a more deadly viking ghost named Farhod the Fierce, who takes over Boomer's body. Brady seeks help from June, the lady who sold him the ghost. Guest star: Edie McClurg as June and Patrick Gallagher as Farhod the Fierce Absent: Kelsey Chow as Mikayla
16	16	"The King and Eyes"	Leonard R. Garner, Jr.	Sean W. Cunningham & Marc Dworkin	January 31, 2011	117
The kings are told that they have to try to win a competition when they attempt to arrange a treaty with the adversary island of Cornea; the winner receives the reward of a princess, but Brady and Boomer discover she is not a typical princess as she and her father each have three eyes. Meanwhile, Mason hopes for the treaty to succeed so he can receive a bottle of special sauce from Cornea. Guest star: Tiffany Mulheron as Princess Iris and Oliver Muirhead as her father and King of the island Cornea.
17	17	"The Kings Beneath My Wings"	Robbie Countryman	Chris Atwood	February 7, 2011	118
The kings decide to have a "king for a day" contest, which is won by a boy named Hilo Tutuki, who admires the kings. Everyone gets into trouble when Hilo tries to stop a dangerous beast. Guest star: Tyrel Jackson Williams as Hilo Tutuki Absent: Geno Segers as Mason
18	18	"Fight School"	Linda Mendoza	Eric Lev	April 18, 2011	116
After learning their father was the best warrior in island history, Boomer and Brady enroll in Kinkow Fight School. When Mason gives the kings special treatment, jealousy overcomes Mikayla. Taking Lanny's advice, she decides to test the kings' newfound confidence and skills by pitting them against Atog the Giant. When Mason finds out, Mikayla tries to get the kings to back down, but it is too late as the kings are eager to prove their inner warrior. Special guest star: The Great Khali as Atog the Giant
19	19	"The Trouble With Doubles"	Eric Dean Seaton	Lisa Muse Bryant	April 25, 2011	119
Boomer and Brady discover Vault 14, a secret vault which protects Kinkow's most mysterious and powerful artifacts including Duplicatus Plantus, a plant that copies anything it touches. The kings make clones of themselves and while they go surfing, they send their doubles to the Kalooki Island Peace Summit. Filling in for the brothers, the clones impress Mikayla, the island dignitaries and the other Kinkowians with their intelligence, hygiene, and professionalism. However, when Brady and Boomer overhear the clones' ultimate plan to take over, the kings must figure out how to get rid of their doubles and take back their kingdom.
20	20	"Journey to the Center of Mt. Spew"	Victor Gonzalez	Dan Cross & David Hoge	May 2, 2011	121
It is the kings' birthday and for their royal present, they each get one wish that will come true. Right before blowing out the candles, Boomer learns that Brady has been bragging to the entire island that he is the older twin. Boomer uses his wish to find out the truth about who was born first, while Brady's wish is that Mikayla cannot stop complimenting him for one day. Boomer travels to the center of Mt. Spew to meet with the volcano's Oracle and learn who is the older king, but the younger brother will no longer be co-king if it is known who the older brother is. Brady, Mikayla, and Mason chase after Boomer, while Lanny follows them, trying to kill the kings.

=== Season 2 (2011–12) ===
No. overall	No. in season	Title	Directed by	Written by	Original release date	Prod. code	US viewers (millions)
21	1	"Kings of Legend" (Part 1)	Eric Dean Seaton	David Hoge & Dan Cross	June 13, 2011	201	0.6
While trying to prove that they are the Kings of Legend, Brady and Boomer accidentally bring Zadoc, an ancient evil statue, to life, consequently putting the entire island in extreme danger, which brings Mason to believe that he was wrong about them being the Kings of Legend. The twins cede the throne to Lanny for the better of Kinkow and depart on a balloon voyage back to Chicago for good, until Zadoc fires a magical orb at the balloon and sends it and the kings plummeting straight to the dark side of the island. The kings realize they have made a big mistake. Special Guest Stars: Michael Bailey Smith as Zadoc Guest stars: James Hong as Elder #1 and John Tartaglia as the voice of the Parrot
22	2	"Kings of Legend" (Part 2)	Eric Dean Seaton	David Hoge & Dan Cross	June 20, 2011	202	0.8
Zadoc's minions capture king Lanny and try to kill him, so Zadoc can take over the island. Lanny hands the throne back to Brady and Boomer. Mason goes after Zadoc and sees Boomer and Brady fight and defeat Zadoc and realizes that maybe they are the Kings of Legend.
23	3	"Good King Hunting"	Linda Mendoza	David Hoge & Dan Cross	June 27, 2011	203	0.9
Brady finally musters up the courage to ask Mikayla out, by using a note Lanny wrote for him, but he reconsiders and decides to ask her in person; when Brady attempts to retrieve the note, Mikayla mistakenly assumes the note is from Boomer, and he learns that before dating a girl in Kinkow, one must be hunted down by her father. During the night while Boomer is getting hunted, Brady tells Mason that he is the one who wants to date Mikayla. Mason starts hunting Brady. Brady spits an egg at Mason, knocking him out. In the morning they go back to the kingdom and Brady asks Mikayla out but she says no, because he humiliated Mason in front of the people of Kinkow.
24	4	"Dinner for Squonks"	Linda Mendoza	Sean W. Cunningham & Marc Dworkin	July 11, 2011	204	0.7
The kings discover Mason and Mikayla have been running the country's daily operations from their secret underground headquarters. Outraged, the kings insist on making all future decisions, including taking the lead on an important peace meeting with the Squonks, a breed of troll people who keep the island's Mukarat population under control. But when the kings offend the Squonks, the island is quickly overrun with Mukarats. In order to make things right, Boomer and Brady must endure a forgiveness feast with the Squonk Queen. Guest star: Mikey Post as Sherpa Squonk & Debbie Lee Carrington as Squonk Queen
25	5	"Kings of Thieves"	Robbie Countryman	Sean W. Cunningham & Marc Dworkin	July 18, 2011	205	1.0
When the kings' over-the-top spending causes a monetary crisis on Kinkow, Lanny has the islanders pay mandatory donations to the kings. Buying time until they find a better solution to fix the crisis, Brady and Boomer disguise themselves as bandits Sirocco and Sirocco Taco, stealing the kingdom's donations and returning the money to the public. Sirocco becomes an instant hit with the Kinkowians and especially Mikayla. She begins to fall in love with Sirocco but does not realize it is Brady. With criminals on the loose, the Kinkowians start to get angry and the kings must find a way to restore the island's fortune, capture the "criminals" and win back their kingdom's support. Guest star: John O'Hurley as Ron the Adventure Narrator
26	6	"An Ice Girl for Boomer"	Eric Dean Seaton	Lance Crouther	July 25, 2011	206	0.7
During a heat wave, Brady and Boomer discover an ice cave in the jungle upon being given directions to it by Lanny. Later, through video messaging, Brady tries to convince Boomer's "girlfriend" Rebecca to leave Chicago and visit the island for an upcoming luau. Rebecca, who does not realize that Boomer considers her his girlfriend, fakes computer difficulties and ends the conversation. Boomer accuses Brady of ruining his chances to be together with Rebecca. With the soaring temperatures, Brady returns to the cave to cool off and discovers a beautiful cavegirl who has thawed out. Brady decides to transform her into Boomer's date for the upcoming Luau, and names her Uhngela. When Rebecca unexpectedly arrives in Kinkow for the luau, Boomer decides to go with her, while Brady unsuccessfully attempts to keep Uhngela contained, as she has become violently jealous of Rebecca. Uhngela's caveman boyfriend thaws out in the ice cave and is upset that Uhngela wants to be with Boomer instead. The two cave people wreak havoc at the luau, where Ungela's boyfriend kidnaps Rebecca. Boomer convinces Uhngela to be with her boyfriend, who then releases Rebecca. Special appearance by: Ron Fassler as Dale Davis; Guest stars: Logan Browning as Rebecca "Awesome" Dawson and Jillian Nelson as Uhngela Absent: Geno Segers as Mason
27	7	"Pair of Geniuses"	Adam Weissman	Lisa Muse Bryant	August 1, 2011	207	1.0
Boomer and Brady are flattered when a pair of cute queens from the neighboring island of Sununu compliment their latest ridiculous invention and ask them to be the Kings of Sununu. However, the Kings soon realize that Queen Hesta, Queen Desta and their kingdom are victims of a dumb-curse. In order to help cure the entire island of stupidity, Boomer and Brady must solve the Sununu Statue's riddle. When Brady gets the riddle wrong so the girls could still admire him and Boomer, the Statue puts the dumb-curse on King Brady, forcing Boomer to get help from Mason, Mikayla, and Lanny to solve the riddle by sunset or else they will be dumb-cursed. Guest stars: Kara Pacitto as Queen Hesta, Katelyn Pacitto as Queen Desta and John Hartmann as Rockhead
28	8	"How I Met Your Brother"	Joel Zwick	Donald Beck	August 8, 2011	208	0.7
It is Mikayla's birthday and Mason's brother Jason visits, but Mason is not so welcoming due to an incident when they were children. When the kings make Jason head guard, Mason quits and drowns his sorrows in eating. But when the Tarantula people try to roast Boomer alive, Jason cowardly runs off and it is up to Brady to convince Mason and his bloated self to come back and save Boomer. When Mason arrives, he and King Brady are captured by tarantula people. Then Jason's water scooter falls on two Tarantula People, and Jason falls on the other two, saving everyone.
29	9	"The One About Mikayla's Friends"	Leonard R. Garner, Jr.	Lisa Muse Bryant	August 22, 2011	209	0.9
When Mikayla's watchful eye keeps Brady and Boomer from getting into mischief and unknowingly thwarting Lanny's plots, Brady and Boomer host an island-wide search to find Mikayla a friend to keep her busy. The kings soon regret the set-up when her new friend's "beauty over safety" mantra puts all of their lives in danger. Guest star: Brittany Ross as Candis and Jillian Rose Reed as Tessa Note: The episode is titled in the style of episodes of Friends.
30	10	"Do Over"	David Kendall	Chris Atwood	September 26, 2011	210	0.5
Boomer and Brady find an ancient pocket watch that grants them the ability to restart the day as many times as they want without anyone else remembering. Boomer uses the watch to plan a retaliation prank against Mason, while Brady perfects his date with Mikayla. But when the group gets captured by the Tarantula People and the watch goes missing, the kings start to panic and hope they can do-over the day one last time to save themselves.
31	11	"Big Mama Waka"	Adam Weissman	Matt Wickline	October 3, 2011	211	0.4
Mikayla comes down with a fever and starts to turn into a Waka Waka Bug. So Boomer and Brady go to the Waka Waka Bug's hive to try to get the rare medicine to cure her. Guest star: James Hong as Island Shaman
32	12	"Sleepless in the Castle"	Victor Gonzalez	Sean W. Cunningham & Marc Dworkin	October 17, 2011	212	0.6
Fed up with Brady's unusual habit of becoming a sleep ninja at night, Boomer impulsively moves out. But when his new landlord Charlotte turns out to be a former Tarantula person and transforms Mason into a cold-blooded terminator, Boomer must turn to his brother for help.
33	13	"Pair of Clubs"	Adam Weissman	Sean W. Cunningham & Marc Dworkin	October 24, 2011	213	0.5
Boomer opens the teen hotspot of his dreams and hires Brady as his assistant. When Boomer fires him, Brady spitefully opens his own club inside a crypt upon being guided there by Lanny. When Brady performs a new song for the crowd with the lyrics having been provided by Lanny, the club is overrun by zombies that have been awakened by the song. Now it is up to Boomer to put his differences aside and rescue his brother. Absent: Geno Segers as Mason
34	14	"The Cheat Life of Brady and Boomer"	Leonard R. Garner, Jr.	David Hoge & Dan Cross	November 21, 2011	214	0.7
Brady and Boomer must endure a King Challenge that tests their smarts, strength, and spirits. When Mikayla realizes the boys will not pass the challenge, she agrees to help them, but the plan goes horribly wrong when Mikayla and Lanny are transformed into Boomer and Brady. Note: The title is a reference to the Disney Channel series, The Suite Life of Zack & Cody.
35	15	"The Ex Factor"	Robbie Countryman	Sean W. Cunningham & Marc Dworkin	November 28, 2011	215	0.6
When Mikayla's ex-boyfriend Lucas (a pirate who broke her heart) refuses to participate in the official Kinkowian Dumping Ritual, the kings track him down and discover that Lucas looks just like Boomer. To help out his quest to finally date Mikayla, Brady makes Boomer impersonate Lucas and pretend to go through the official ceremony, but the plan backfires when the real Lucas arrives and captures Mikayla. Brady and Boomer go aboard Lucas' pirate ship to save Mikayla. Special guest star: Doc Shaw as Lucas Absent: Geno Segers as Mason
36	16	"Pair of Santas"	Linda Mendoza	Story by : Matt Wickline; Teleplay by : David Hoge & Dan Cross	December 5, 2011	216	0.3
In an effort to bring their holiday traditions to Kinkow, the kings promise the islanders a Super Christmas and enlist Kinkow's elves to make the toys. When the elves revolt against them, Boomer and Brady must figure out how to save Christmas.
37	17	"No Rhyme or Treason"	Larry McLean	Donald Beck	January 23, 2012	217	0.6
Mikayla ends her friendship with Brady after his flirting becomes too much to bear. But when Mikayla and Boomer bond over her new hobby called Kinkowian poetry slams, a jealous Brady outlaws poetry and tries to sabotage their blossoming friendship. Special guest appearance by: Walter Emanuel Jones as Tough Poet Absent: Geno Segers as Mason
38	18	"Mr. Boogey Shoes"	Adam Weissman	John D. Beck & Ron Hart	January 30, 2012	218	0.6
Boomer blames a creature named Mr. Boogey when a pair of Brady's favorite Air Drogens sneakers is stolen. Everyone on Kinkow including Brady thinks Boomer is lying, except for Mason who has been harboring a big secret. Guest star: Doug Tait as Mr. Boogey
39	19	"The Young and the Restless"	Linda Mendoza	Dave Polsky	February 6, 2012	219	0.8
Brady and Boomer meet two good looking girls at their "Meet the Kings" mixer. The girls then trick the kings into activating the Fountain of Youth and turn them old. But things get worse when Mason tries to save them, but ends up harming himself as well by turning into an infant. So, it is up to Mikayla to save all of the guys before the kings become too old to live, and before Mason is taken by the old hags. Guest star: Abbie Cobb as young Ethel and Emily Wilson as young Gertrude
40	20	"Let the Clips Show"	David Kendall	Eric Lev	February 13, 2012	220	N/A
When the castle mysteriously explodes, Boomer and Brady are taken to court and forced to relive their most embarrassing and heroic moments through video clips when they try to prove to the jury that they are not guilty of the unlikely event. Guest stars: James Hong as Judge Note: This episode aired in the UK on July 5, 2012.
41	21	"Crouching Brady, Hidden Boomer"	David Kendall	Matt Wickline	March 19, 2012	221	0.6
When he goes on a date with Sabrina, a cute girl from the Nanju Warrior tribe, Brady realizes that she is Mikayla's biggest rival from Kinkow fight school. Sabrina challenges Mikayla to a duel. But when Mikayla refuses, Sabrina takes Brady prisoner. Mikayla heads to the Nanju forest, known for its magnetic fields, and competes in an aerial duel to save her friend. At the end, Mikayla wins because Brady took the belt from Sabrina that allows her to fly. Guest star: Skyler Vallo as Sabrina; Note: This episode aired in Canada on Family on January 29, 2012. Absent: Geno Segers as Mason
42	22	"Beach Party Maggot Massacre"	Sean Mulcahy	Lisa Muse Bryant	March 26, 2012	222	0.7
When an advance copy of their high school yearbook arrives, the kings realize they are going to be remembered back in Chicago for throwing the worst party ever. To repair their reputation, Boomer and Brady invite their entire high school class to Kinkow for an epic beach party, but disaster strikes when their classmates are hunted by a giant Kinkow Sand Maggot.
43	23	"Make Dirt, Not War"	Victor Gonzalez	Lisa Muse Bryant	April 2, 2012	223	0.7
Brady tries to unite two conflicting tribes to impress Mikayla, but things do not go as he planned. Special guest stars: Jennifer Stone as Priscilla and Doug Brochu as Oogie
44	24	"Cooks Can Be Deceiving"	Victor Gonzalez	Donald Beck	April 9, 2012	224	0.6
The head chef quits when he is ordered by King Boomer and King Brady to prepare a steak cake when he was supposed to be making a very important meal for a giant ogre who is about to wake up from an annual 10-year sleep. When the ogre wakes up and demands food, the kings have to make a dish for him to save the island from his wrath. Special guest star: Dwight Howard as The Head Chef Absent: Geno Segers as Mason
45	25	"The Evil King"	Linda Mendoza	Sean W. Cunningham & Marc Dworkin (Part 1); David Hoge & Dan Cross (Part 2)	April 16, 2012	225-226	1.0
When two moons appear, the kings meet the ghost of Malakai, the first king of Kinkow, who explains that an evil twin will destroy the island. After interrogating every twin on Kinkow, Boomer and Brady begin to turn on each other. Following Lanny's advice, the kings journey to the dark side to the evil king's castle to sit on the evil throne and learn the truth. The prophecy comes true when the evil king is revealed, putting Brady under a spell and morphing him into evil Brady. With Mason and Mikayla in tow, Boomer heads to the dark side to save his brother and the island from sinking into the seas. Meanwhile, following a dream where she kissed Brady, Mikayla believes she may have a crush on him. Her friend Candis tells her that she does. Later when heading on with Boomer and Mason to save Brady from the evil king Kalakai, an evil Brady engages Boomer in a sword fight. Just before Brady can finish off Boomer, Mikayla gives him a long kiss, breaking him from Kalakai's spell. Together Brady and Boomer use their special rings to defeat Kalakai. Brady takes Mikayla's hand and asks what is next. Mikayla in turn tells Brady that the kiss was just to save him and it was for the love of her country, and walks away. It is implied that Mikayla may still actually love Brady but just simply told him that the kiss was not about that. Brady, Boomer, and Mason follow Mikayla back to the castle where Brady claims that "she so loves me." Guest stars: Bobby Ray Shafer as the ghost of Malakai, Brittany Ross as Candis, Maxxie J.Santillan Jr. as Stately Islander. Last appearance as a main character: Mitchel Musso as King Brady

=== Season 3 (2012–13) ===
- On December 12, 2011, Disney XD announced that Pair of Kings had been renewed for a third season with actor Adam Hicks to join the cast, replacing Mitchel Musso. This is also the last season for the series.

No. overall	No. in season	Title	Directed by	Written by	Original release date	Prod. code	US viewers (millions)
46	1	"The New King, (Part 1): Destiny's Child"	David Kendall	Dan Cross & David Hoge	June 18, 2012	301	0.8
Brady overhears Candis gossiping with Mikayla, and discovers that Mikayla does not want to date him because she believes that he is immature and will never grow up as long as he is the king of Kinkow. Brady leaves the island to go back to Chicago and vows to not come back until he can prove himself to be worthy of Mikayla. Boomer finds out about this and tries to follow Brady. But when a storm hits Kinkow sending people from the neighboring island of Mindu to them, it forces him to stay. They find the young king of Mindu has the Kinkow birthmark on his bellybutton which means he is also the king of Kinkow. Mason reveals that the boy is Brady and Boomer's long-lost triplet brother, Boz, who was raised by monkeys after being lost in a storm and presumed dead. Guest stars: James Hong as Elder First appearance: Adam Hicks as King Boz
47	2	"The New King, (Part 2): The Bro-Fessor and Mary Ann"	David Kendall	Dan Cross & David Hoge	June 25, 2012	302	0.7
Boomer teaches Boz about the Ten Bro-Mandments. However, a Tarantula Girl named Mary-Ann comes between them after she finds Brady's King Ring. Lanny tells Boomer that Boz is in the jungle, so Boomer goes after Boz, not realizing that Boz was up in the rafters of their bedroom. Boomer meets Mary-Ann in the jungle and she leads him to the Tarantula People and shows him Brady's King Ring. She throws it in a ditch. Boz saves Boomer from death and Boomer uses his secret ballet skills to defeat the Tarantula People. Boz's coronation then takes place. Guest star: Denyse Tontz as Mary-Ann
48	3	"Two Kings and a Devil Baby"	Linda Mendoza	Matt Wickline	July 2, 2012	303	0.6
When Boz defies Boomer's warnings and goes to the Dark Side, he finds a baby and brings it home only to discover the Tarantula People are threatening war because someone has stolen their baby prince. Boomer and Boz must learn to work together and return the feral, hissing, highly mobile baby to the Tarantula People before war breaks out.
49	4	"Fatal Distraction"	David Kendall	Sean W. Cunningham & Marc Dworkin	July 9, 2012	304	0.7
When Boomer and Boz tarnish Mikayla’s first chance of beating Mason for "Guard of the Year", they feel guilty and secretly set out to help her win the coveted award by putting themselves in danger for her to rescue them. When their attempt fails, they try to distract Mason and give Mikayla an edge by setting him up with a pretty woman who turns out to be his ex-girlfriend that wreaks havoc on Kinkow. In the end, Mikayla wins Guard of the Year. Guest star: Kasey Wilson as Pitricia
50	5	"Wet Hot Kinkowan Summer"	Adam Weissman	Lisa Muse Bryant	July 16, 2012	305	0.8
Boomer, sick of Mikayla's awkwardness and overall lack of coolness, decides a summer vacation cruise with the rest of the island's teens could make her more popular. But when Boomer unknowingly steers the ship into the Dark Side waters trying to impress some girls, the only teens Mikayla befriends are undercover amphibious creatures that have snuck aboard in search of live offerings for their swamp dwelling overlord, a massive bullfrog. When the summer vacation goes awry, the kings and the rest of the teens have to rely on Mikayla to save them.
51	6	"O Lanada"	Sean Mulcahy	Sean W. Cunningham & Marc Dworkin	July 23, 2012	306	0.7
When Boomer and Boz find out Lanny is mad at them, they buy him his own island to rule. But when Mikayla informs the kings that the secret source of their wealth lives on that island, a gopher that naturally produces gold, they must try to get the gopher back without Lanny finding out. Guest star: Morgan Leigh as Royal Mime, Eric Petersen as Catawampus Absent: Geno Segers as Mason
52	7	"Heart and Troll"	Adam Weissman	Donald Beck	July 30, 2012	307	0.3
Boz tries to prove to his ex-girlfriend that his life is better without her by putting on a big charade portraying an impossibly amazing life, complete with his own servant (Boomer), a magical troll that grants wishes (Lanny), and a pet Sasquatch (Mason). Unbeknownst to the kings, she does not actually care about Boz and is only there to take the riches he made up, including Boomer and Lanny. Guest stars: Hayley Hasselhoff as Sasha, Blaise Embry as Morris
53	8	"I Know What You Did Last Sunday"	Rich Correll	Donald Beck	September 10, 2012	308	N/A
Having heard all about Boomer's legendary achievements on Kinkow, Boz feels the pressure to be an equally great leader. But, his goal is hampered when Tito, a twelve-year-old boy, shows up and threatens to reveal that Boz was accidentally responsible for sinking Mindu. Tito blackmails Boz into giving him whatever he wants, including ownership of Boomer's club, in exchange for keeping the secret. Guest star: Karan Brar as Tito
54	9	"Lord of the Fries"	Leonard R. Garner, Jr.	Lisa Muse Bryant	September 17, 2012	309	N/A
When one of the kings' stunts gets Mikayla suspended, the boys refuse to take responsibility. Mikayla calls them horrible bosses to herself, quits her job as their protector, and takes a job at a local fast food restaurant. When the kings' attempts to get her back fail, they buy the restaurant and become her bosses all over again.
55	10	"Dancing With the Scars"	Robbie Countryman	Pat Bullard	September 24, 2012	310	N/A
Boomer, jealous of the attention Boz is getting, enters the Jikki Kiki dance contest, and picks Boz as the second dancer, believing it an easy win, but when Boomer discovers that Boz is a great dancer, a rivalry develops between the two. Absent: Geno Segers as Mason
56	11	"I'm Gonna Git You, Sponge Sucka'"	Leonard R. Garner, Jr.	Dan Cross & David Hoge	October 1, 2012	311	N/A
When Mason thinks Boomer's club Boomerama is too rowdy, he takes over as head bouncer, but starts to keep the party guests out. In order to get Mason away from the club, the kings lead him on a wild goose chase, leaving the club wide open and vulnerable to a mythical human-like sponge creature named Damone who absorbs everyone's confidence. Special guest star: The Miz as Damone
57	12	"Bond of Brothers"	Ken Ceizler	Lisa Muse Bryant	October 8, 2012	312	N/A
Boomer and Boz are each granted one wish on their birthday. Boomer wishes for the island to be danger-free for a date with his girlfriend Rebecca "Awesome" Dawson, who arrives on Kinkow for a visit. Boz wishes for him and Boomer to be closer, but the wish is granted literally when they become magnetically attached. Things get worse when Lanny arranges for Boomer and Rebecca to have their date at Lightning Grove on the Dark Side of Kinkow. Guest star: Logan Browning as Rebecca "Awesome" Dawson
58	13	"King vs. Wild"	Leonard R. Garner, Jr.	Bob Keyes & Doug Keyes	October 15, 2012	313	N/A
After all that Boomer has taught Boz about living in the civilized world, Boz decides to address Boomer's lack of survival skills and forces him to go camping. Although Boomer is resistant at first, he has no choice but to become a fast learner and use his newfound skills when the camping trip goes awry, and he needs to help Boz fight for their lives against a jungle werewolf.
59	14	"Inconvenient Tooth"	Victor Gonzalez	Chase Heinrich	October 22, 2012	314	N/A
Boomer begs Boz to get rid of his unattractive tooth that he uses to open everything, but Boz's plan to become more refined takes a bad turn when the evil dentist he goes to ends up wanting to seek revenge on Boomer for ruining his business and implants a robotic replacement tooth to control him.
60	15	"The Oogli Stick"	Rich Correll	Wesley Jermaine Johnson & Scott Taylor	October 29, 2012	315	N/A
The Kings turn down the Goat Sisters Billie and Nannie (who wish to be their dates to the "Queen Uber Oogli Dance") and are then changed by a curse into ugly, unrecognizable versions of themselves. Now they must break it by dancing with the fairest girls in the village, which is much easier said than done. Special guest stars: Eden Sher as Billie and Erin Sanders as Nannie Absent: Geno Segers as Mason
61	16	"Thumb & Thumber"	Larry McLean	Sean W. Cunningham & Marc Dworkin	November 5, 2012	316	N/A
When Boz sets out to help Boomer make his childhood dream of becoming a professional athlete come true, Boomer believes he is a natural at the dangerous island sport of Thumb War. With a chance to become a pro thumb warrior, Boomer wagers the castle and loses only to find he has been conned by a Dark Side crook. Guest star: Cooper Barnes as Tom Thumb Absent: Geno Segers as Mason
62	17	"Loathe Potion No. 9"	Linda Mendoza	Lisa Muse Bryant	November 26, 2012	317	N/A
Boomer fears that Mikayla and Boz's budding friendship will blossom into a crush and he will lose another brother to a Mikayla preoccupation. He gives Boz and Mikayla a Dirt Fairy potion so they will dislike each other, but the potion is too potent and sends them into mortal combat instead. Absent: Geno Segers as Mason
63	18	"Yeti, Set, Snow"	Robbie Countryman	Sean W. Cunningham & Marc Dworkin	December 3, 2012	318	N/A
When Boomer discovers that he and Boz do not have any brotherly memories like he and Brady do, he sets out to recreate a ski-trip from his childhood on Kings' Peak (the only snow-capped mountain on Kinkow). But when Boomer finds that the land he wants to build his resort on is occupied by Yetis, he removes them from the land and attempts to teach them how to be civilized.
64	19	"Mysteries of Kinkow"	Sean Mulcahy	Matt Wickline	February 4, 2013	319	N/A
Boomer, Boz, Mikayla, Mason, and Lanny watch Candis's show revealing the mysteries of Kinkow, causing Boz to have doubts about being Co-King. When a temple is discovered belonging to an ancient evil named Kaita the Bat Rider (whose mummy is in the possession of the Tarantula People), Candis is trapped inside and the entrance is sealed by a force field that only the kings can get through.
65	20	"Meet the Parents"	Eric Dean Seaton	Donald Beck	February 11, 2013	320	N/A
Boomer goes to Chicago in an effort to convince Rebecca's father to let him see her after he forbids them to be together. Boz comes along and searches for a safe place to hide the Bat Medallion. Meanwhile, a menace from the past launches a surprise attack on the kings and it is revealed that Rebecca's father used to be part of the Tarantula tribe. As a result, he erases Rebecca's memory of her relationship with Boomer to keep her safe. However at the end, Rebecca was shown to have found the Bat Medallion in the pillow where Boz had hid it and she was seen to have been possess by the Bat Medallion.
66	21	"Long Live the Kings, Part 1"	David Kendall	Dan Cross & David Hoge	February 18, 2013	321	N/A
The Bat Medallion that Boz hid in Rebecca's apartment has dragged Rebecca to Kinkow. When Mikayla confiscates the Bat Medallion, Kutamungo captures her and the Bat Medallion in order to revive the Tarantula People's leader Kaita the Bat-Rider. The kings' fear of Kaita the Bat-Rider turns into revenge when they discover the evil Kaita is responsible for their father's death.
67	22	"Long Live the Kings, Part 2"	David Kendall	Dan Cross & David Hoge	February 18, 2013	322	N/A
With Kaita the Bat-Rider at large with his army of undead zombies, Mason and Mikayla use a forcefield to give them time to devise a counter-attack against Kaita's army. Boomer and Boz also have an encounter with the ghosts of their parents, who encourage them to use their bond to defeat Kaita the Bat-Rider.
