= J. Peterman Company =

American retail company

The J. Peterman Company
- Type: Private
- Industry: Retail
- Founded: Lexington, Kentucky, U.S. (1987–2000, 2001–present)
- Founder: John Peterman
- Headquarters: Blue Ash, Ohio, U.S.
- Products: Clothing and home accessories
- Website: www.jpeterman.com

The J. Peterman Company is an American retail company that sells clothing, fashion accessories, and furniture primarily through catalogs and the Internet. It was founded by John Peterman in 1987 and has its headquarters in Blue Ash, Ohio. By August 2026, the company had stopped taking orders, and the Ohio Attorney General, believing it to be no longer in operation, filed a lawsuit against it for failing to deliver products or to provide refunds under the normal course of business.

== History ==
=== Early history: 1986–1994 ===
The J. Peterman Company was founded in 1987 by John Peterman, an entrepreneur who was formerly a minor league baseball player. In 1986, John Peterman bought a cowboy duster in Wyoming and received multiple compliments when he wore it. He and his friend Don Staley decided to write an ad copy to sell a few thousand coats. Don Staley wrote the copy and they published the ad in The New Yorker in 1987. They sold 70 coats through the ad. Along with the horseman's duster, the J. Peterman Company was started with $500 out of John Peterman's pocket and an unsecured loan of $20,000.

In 1988, the J. Peterman Company published its first catalog. It offered distinctive lifestyle merchandise (including reproductions of antique clothing and clothing worn in specific films) portrayed in a distinctive way. Products were illustrated with black and white drawings, and described in a literary style, often at considerable length:

"When a man puts on this authentic French farmer's shirt he may very well find that his hands look bigger … Is that woman over there giving him the eye and nodding toward the haystack? Yes, and he knows what to do."

— French Farmer Shirt

"Thos. Jefferson disliked stuffy people, stuffy houses, stuffy societies. So he changed a few things. Law. Gardening. Government. Architecture. Of the thousand castles, mansions, chateaux you can walk through today, only Monticello, only Jefferson's own mansion, makes you feel so comfortable you want to live in it. I think you will feel the same about his 18th-century shirt. Classic. Simple. Livable."

— The J. Peterman Shirt

"Enter the new woman: rebellious, out there, living life on her own terms… Feels like a whisper in silky crinkly georgette. Which could be the only thing about it that whispers…"

— Flapper Dress

The first color catalog was produced in 1989, continuing to depict products with illustrations rather than photos. Within the first year, the J. Peterman Company made $300,000 in sales on media ad space. In 1989, the company made $4.8 million in sales, and concluded its first deal with Hambro America. The next year, the company made almost $20 million in sales and the company expanded to 80 employees. In December 1992, the J. Peterman Company opened its first retail store in Lexington, Kentucky, and sold strawberry preserves, a Chinese-made BMW-style motorcycle with sidecar, and a 38-pound silver bar from a 17th-century sunken Spanish ship.

=== Seinfeld and Titanic: 1995–1999 ===
During the 1990s, the J. Peterman Company catalog attracted attention from celebrities, like Oprah Winfrey, Tom Hanks, Clint Eastwood, and Paul Newman. From 1995 to 1998, Seinfeld, the most popular television series at the time, parodied the owner and the company with Elaine Benes working at the catalog under eccentric businessman and world traveler J. Peterman, played by John O'Hurley. The show's lawyers approached the real John Peterman after the first episode and allowed him to review each script before it aired. That same year, the J. Peterman Company posted a $400,000 loss.

In 1996, the company began making plans to expand even though it cancelled $1 million worth of inventory orders. The company planned to open 70 stores and make $500 million in sales within five years.

In December 1997, the company made a deal with 20th Century Fox to sell both original and authorized replica costumes and props from its upcoming film Titanic. Most analysts expected the film to be a costly flop, and the J. Peterman Company chose to feature it simply because the film fit its brand as a period piece. When Titanic proved to be the biggest financial hit of all time, the J. Peterman Company found itself with a lucrative line of collectibles. The best-selling product was the only authorized replica of the film's iconic Le Cœur de la Mer blue diamond necklace. The company sold over $1 million worth of the necklaces, priced at $198 each.

Flush with the success of its Titanic bonanza, the company raised private equity to expand. It opened up 10 retail stores in several markets, including New York, Detroit, and San Francisco. In December 1998, the company began to lay off employees and its lender gave a forbearance agreement. The stores were moderately successful but the growth was too fast for the company's small operations. Despite $75 million in sales at its peak, the company was forced into Chapter 11 bankruptcy in January 1999.

=== Bankruptcy: 1999–2001 ===
On January 26, 1999, The J. Peterman Company sought bankruptcy protection from creditors and filed the petition under Chapter 11 of the Bankruptcy Code. The company was purchased by Paul Harris Stores in 1999 for $10 million, without the future participation of John Peterman. However, Paul Harris Stores went bankrupt in 2000.

In 2001, John Peterman and Scott Bernstein, a former member of the J. Peterman board and chief operating officer of SB Capital, bought back the intellectual property of the J. Peterman Company, including the brand property and mailing lists, for $600,000. With the help of John O'Hurley, the actor who had portrayed J. Peterman on Seinfeld, as an investor and a core group from the original company (creative director William McCullam, marketing director Jonathan Dunavant, merchant Paula Collins and director of manufacturing Kyle Foster), the company was relaunched.

=== 2001–2014 ===
During 2004, the J. Peterman Company started selling furniture. Jeffco is the company that makes the Peterman furniture and a representative, Tom Morton, says he has a customer that buys the furniture based on the company's recognition in Seinfeld. In 2008, Tim Peterman, son of founder John Peterman, helped run the company as president after leaving E. W. Scripps. John Peterman became chairman and was less involved.

On November 24, 2010, the company was the first to use the marketing term "Red Wednesday Sale", referring to the Wednesday before Thanksgiving as "Black Friday's Impetuous Cousin".

In January 2011, the J. Peterman Company received a Job Creation Tax Credit incentive from the state of Ohio valued at $122,000 over a six-year term. The headquarters was moved from Lexington, Kentucky to Blue Ash, Ohio. By 2012, the website's online traffic increased to more than two million visitors a year.

However, by 2014, long-time employees were leaving the company, including director of manufacturing Kyle Foster. The company posted a substantial loss and the banker reduced its line of credit. The next year, John Peterman became more active in the company and brought back Foster and marketing director Dunavant, another long-time employee. Around this time, Matt Peterman, John Peterman's other son, also came to work for the company directing creative. Until 2020, Kyle Foster was the president of the J. Peterman Company. As of 2023, Jonathan Dunavant is currently senior vice president of strategy and marketing.

=== 2015–present ===
On April 11, 2016, the company launched a Kickstarter campaign to raise money for new product development such as the "Urban Sombrero" from Seinfeld.

In May 2017, the J. Peterman Company planned to open a brick-and-mortar store in Blue Ash, Ohio. Rather than a retail store, it would serve as the warehouse for the company. It was set to open on May 13, 2017. The Smithsonian asked the J. Peterman Company to develop a collection of branded apparel in November 2017. The retail company would create pieces inspired by the historical resources at the museum.

In 2018, the company had 50 full-time employees and brought in a little under $30 million in sales. There were only 20 employees that answered telephone calls, in contrast to 300 employees back when the phone was the primary sale medium.

In 2023 filings made as the company prepared to go public, J. Peterman reported net losses of $3.6 million in 2021 and $5.7 million in 2022 and stated that it expected to continue incurring significant losses. The company ultimately did not go public. In August 2026, the Ohio Attorney General filed a lawsuit against the company, also known as J.P. Outfitters, alleging that it had failed to deliver customer orders, provide refunds for canceled orders or returned merchandise, and respond to customers. The Attorney General stated that the company's retail business was "no longer in operation." In September 2026, Retail Dive reported that the J. Peterman and Territory Ahead websites had stopped accepting orders and that the companies' listed corporate and customer service telephone numbers had been disconnected.

== Marketing ==
In April 2016, the J. Peterman Company began a crowdfunding campaign to raise $500,000 in 40 days. The campaign offered different levels of participation, which includes pledging money for an Otavalo shirt, limited edition silk/cashmere turtleneck, limited edition Mod Flapper dress, the Urban Sombrero (inspired by the hat on "Seinfeld"), full kilt outfit, and a trip with John Peterman. The self-funding credit line would help the company avoid dependency on a bank credit line, which was a problem when the company first began. It also allows customers to interact in the creative process in producing products for the catalog.

In 2018, the J. Peterman Company hired French West Vaughan, a public relations and advertising firm, to help with brand development. The J. Peterman company has also begun to feature on-model photography on its website.
