= John O'Hurley =

American actor

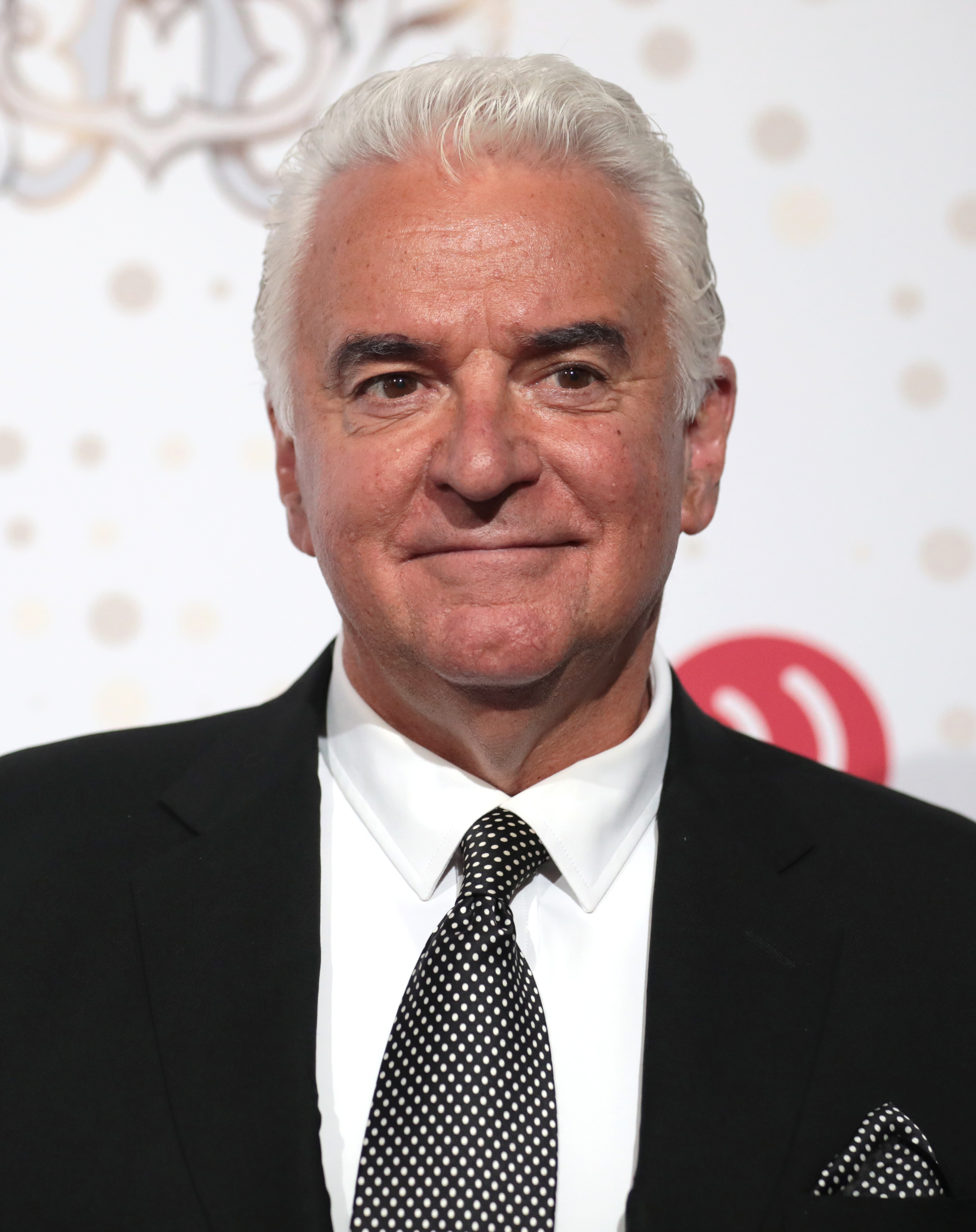
- O'Hurley in 2023
- Born: John George O'Hurley Jr. October 9, 1954 (age 72); Kittery, Maine, U.S.
- Education: Providence College (BA)
- Occupations: Actor; comedian; singer; author; game show host; television personality
- Years active: 1982–present
- Spouses: Eva LaRue (m. 1992; div. 1994) Lisa Mesloh (m. 2004)
- Children: 1
- Website: www.johnohurley.com

John George O'Hurley Jr. (born October 9, 1954) is an American actor, comedian, and game show host. He played J. Peterman on the NBC sitcom Seinfeld, provided the voice for King Neptune on SpongeBob SquarePants, and hosted the game show Family Feud from 2006 to 2010. O'Hurley also hosted To Tell the Truth from 2000 to 2002 in syndication.

== Early life ==
O'Hurley was born in Kittery, Maine, the son of Jeana, a housewife and John George O'Hurley, an ear, nose, and throat surgeon. O'Hurley attended Kingswood-Oxford School in West Hartford, Connecticut, and Cardinal Gibbons High School in Fort Lauderdale, Florida, his senior year, graduating in 1972. O'Hurley graduated from Providence College in 1976 with a Bachelor of Arts in Theatre.

O'Hurley's older sister, Carol, died in 1970 at age 17 due to epileptic seizures, resulting in him performing charitable work for the Epilepsy Foundation.

== Career ==
=== Seinfeld ===
On Seinfeld, O'Hurley played J. Peterman, a fictionalized version of catalog-company entrepreneur John Peterman, from 1995 until the show's end in 1998. O'Hurley invested in the relaunch of The J. Peterman Company, and since 1999 has been a part-owner and member of the board of directors.

=== Dancing with the Stars ===
O'Hurley was a contestant on the first season of the television show Dancing with the Stars, which aired during mid-2005. O'Hurley and his dance partner Charlotte Jørgensen made it to the final competition, which they lost to ABC soap opera star Kelly Monaco.

After fans alleged that Monaco's victory was a set-up, the network announced that O'Hurley, Monaco and their professional dancing partners would face off in a special "grudge match" episode broadcast September 20, 2005. Unlike the first episode, viewer vote solely determined the outcome as opposed to a combination between the three professional judges and the viewer votes.

O'Hurley and Jørgensen emerged as the winners. The rematch earned $126,000 for Golfers Against Cancer charity. Afterward the duo produced a dance instruction video called, "Learn to Dance with John and Charlotte".

Week #	Dance / Song	Judges' score			Result
Week #	Dance / Song	Inaba	Goodman	Tonioli	Result
1	Cha-Cha-Cha/ "September"	7	7	6	No Elimination
2	Quickstep / "Let's Face the Music and Dance"	8	9	9	Safe
3	Tango / "Dance with Me"	9	8	7	Safe
4	Samba / "Just the Two of Us"	7	8	6	Bottom Two
4	Viennese Waltz / "I Got You Babe"	No scores given			Bottom Two
5 Semi-finals	Foxtrot / "Let There Be Love"	9	9	9	Safe
5 Semi-finals	Pasodoble / "Bamboléo"	9	9	9	Safe
6 Finals	Quickstep / "Let's Face the Music and Dance"	9	9	9	Runner-up
6 Finals	Freestyle / "I'm So Excited"	9	9	9	Runner-up
7 Dance-Off	Rumba / "The Look of Love"	7	8	7	Winner
7 Dance-Off	Waltz / "You Light Up My Life"	10	10	10	Winner
7 Dance-Off	Freestyle / "I Am What I Am"	8	8	9	Winner

=== Other roles ===
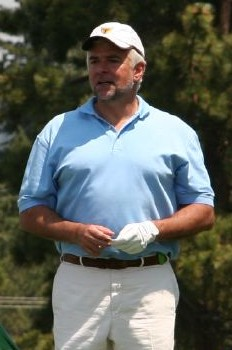
O'Hurley in 2008

O'Hurley made two guest appearances on Baywatch in 1992 and 1994, in two different roles. The first was as villainous yacht club president Fred Adler in "Masquerade," and again as a grieving father named Bill in "Red Wind." In 2003, he played the role of Roger Heidecker on the UPN television series The Mullets.

O'Hurley returned to the Baywatch universe in a 1995 Baywatch Nights episode "Bad Blades," playing the villainous Kemp, in a roller hockey themed episode. He also co-starred on the short-lived sitcom A Whole New Ballgame, had a role as Ralph Stafford on the Murder She Wrote episode "Nailed", and guest-starred in an episode of Drake & Josh.

O'Hurley has been the host of Purina's annual National Dog Show every Thanksgiving since 2002.

In March 2007, O'Hurley took the lead role in the Wynn Las Vegas's production of Spamalot, in which he plays King Arthur. In July 2008, O'Hurley reprised his role as King Arthur in the Los Angeles production of Spamalot at the Ahmanson Theatre. In June 2013, he once again reprised the role of King Arthur in Spamalot at The Muny Theater in St. Louis, Missouri. O'Hurley starred on Broadway and on National Tour as Billy Flynn in Chicago. He has hosted the Mrs. America and Mrs. World Pageants.

O'Hurley is one of the guest speakers in the Candlelight Processional at Epcot in Walt Disney World. He is the voice of the owner of the Cow and Corset bar in the Fable II videogame for the Xbox 360. O'Hurley also replaced Frank Welker as the "Phantom Blot" for Mickey Mouse Works and House of Mouse. He has also provided the voice of King Neptune XIV on SpongeBob SquarePants and done voice-over work for radio stations, including WBEN-FM in Philadelphia, KPKX in Phoenix (as "Jim Peakerman"), KMAX in San Francisco (as "J.J. Maxwell"), and WARH in St. Louis (as "Simon Archer"). O'Hurley has also been the voice of Coors Light commercials for more than 10 years.

O'Hurley guest-starred in an episode of The Emperor's New School called "Malina's Big Break", in 1999 as a cult leader in the Family Guy episode "Chitty Chitty Death Bang", and in 2010, guest-starred on Wizards of Waverly Place as Captain Jim-Bob Sherwood.

From 2008 to 2015, O'Hurley voiced Mayor Roger Doofenshmirtz, Heinz Doofenshmirtz's brother, in Phineas and Ferb. He also played in the award-winning 2000x dramatic series produced by the Hollywood Theater of the Ear for National Public Radio.

O'Hurley was a guest star on multiple episodes of the soap opera All My Children during its last month on ABC, in September 2011, playing Kit Sterling, a producer who approaches Erica Kane to make a movie based on the new book she has just written. O'Hurley previously appeared as Dr. James R. Grainger on The Young and the Restless from 1989-90, and acted in the soap opera Loving as Keith Lane / Jonathan Matalaine.

In 2015, O'Hurley had a recurring role as Dr. Christopher Neff on Devious Maids. He also provided the voice for Victor the Villain on the children's animated TV series Wallykazam!.

==== Game show host ====
From 2000 to 2002, O'Hurley hosted a revival of To Tell the Truth. In 2004, he hosted the limited-run game show The Great American Celebrity Spelling Bee. On September 11, 2006, O'Hurley replaced Richard Karn as the fifth individual to host Family Feud. O'Hurley hosted the show for four seasons, before leaving the show at the beginning of 2010. He was replaced by fellow comedian and film star Steve Harvey. In a 2017 interview with Fox News, O'Hurley agreed that the show became less family-friendly and admitted that as one of the reasons for leaving. He went on to explain:

I got tired of people writing to me saying: 'I can't watch your show. It's a misnomer calling it that because, it's not family. It feels like everything became a penis joke' and I got a little tired of that. I just felt that there are other ways to be more interesting on television and always trying to push that style of family entertainment. I had a great time doing it, but it was time to move on.

== Personal life ==
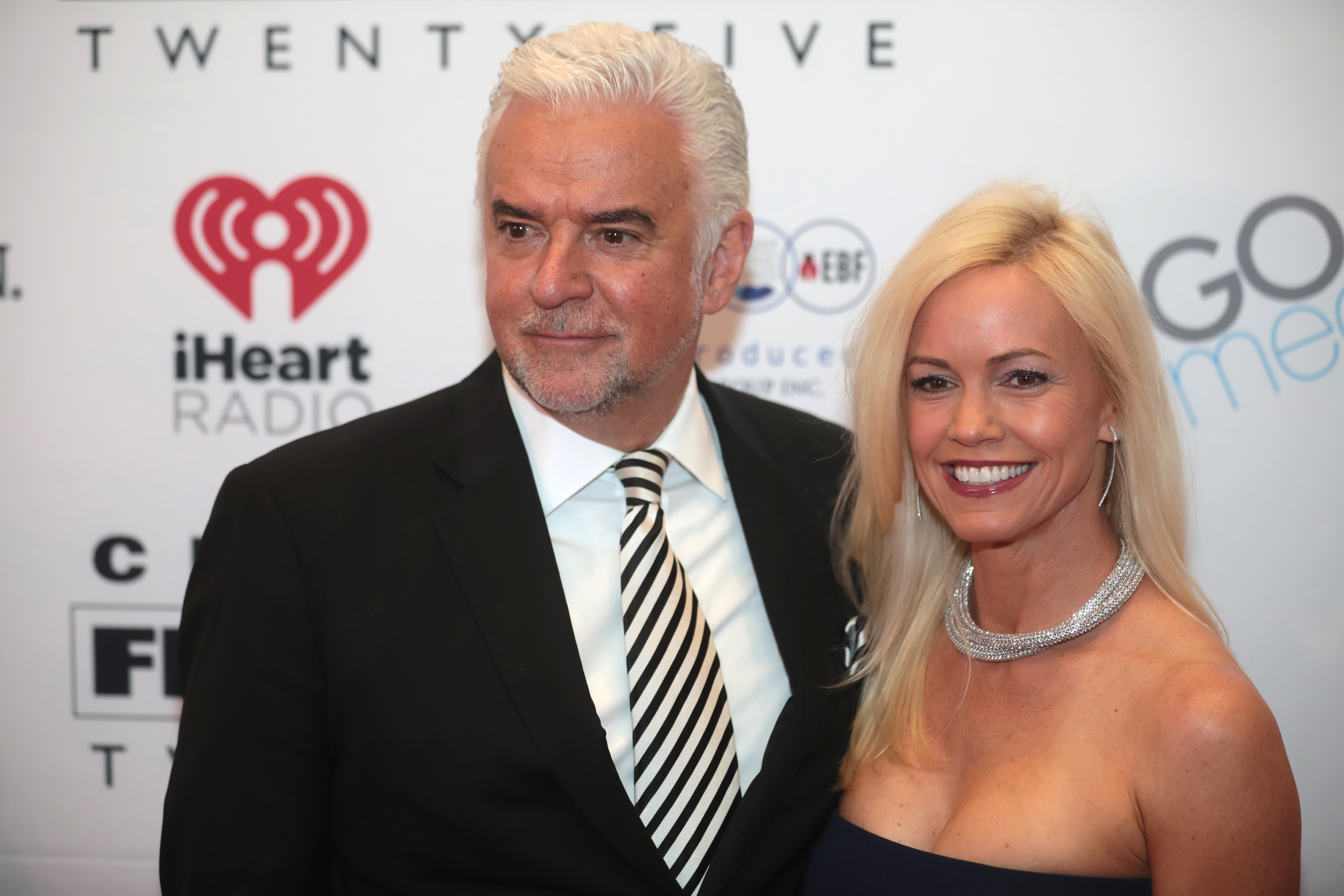
O'Hurley with his wife, Lisa, in 2019

O'Hurley is a self-taught pianist and classically trained vocalist, and has been composing since his teen years. In 2004, in tandem with cellist Marston Smith, he released a two-album project entitled Peace of Our Minds, a compilation of his original piano compositions. The piece "For Lisa" was written for O'Hurley's wife for their wedding day in 2004. O'Hurley was featured on the March/April 2009 cover of Making Music magazine.

O'Hurley was married to Eva LaRue from 1992 to 1994. Since August 14, 2004, he has been married to Lisa Mesloh. They have a son together.

In May 2011, O'Hurley received the Ellis Island Medal of Honor.

O'Hurley is a longtime fan of the Boston Red Sox, Boston Celtics, and New England Patriots.

Through the years, a persistent internet rumor claimed that O'Hurley worked as an exotic dancer at Studio 54 under the stage name "Johnny-O". O'Hurley has explicitly denied the rumor, stating, "I don't know what's on the internet but I was never a stripper."

=== Political views ===
Politically O'Hurley is a conservative.

== Filmography ==
=== Film ===
Year	Title	Role	Notes
1989	Billy the Kid	Dolan	Television film
1991	White Hot: The Mysterious Murder of Thelma Todd	Pat DiCicco	Television film
1991	Night Eyes 2	Detective Turner	
1995	The Power Within	Lt. Cabrell	Direct-to-video
1997	The Killing Secret	Ted Dunleavy	Television film
1997	Murder Live!	Hal Damon	Television film
1998	Tempting Fate	Stewart	Television film
1999	Love Stinks	Walter Drooz	
2001	Race to Space	Barnett, PR Official	
2002	Teddy Bears' Picnic	Earle Hansen	
2002	Buying the Cow	Tim "Timbo" Chadway	
2002	Tarzan & Jane	Johannes Niels (voice)	Direct-to-video
2006	Holidaze: The Christmas That Almost Didn't Happen	Kringle (voice)	Direct-to-video
2008	An American Carol	Silvano	
2010	High School	Drug PSA (voice)	
2011	Beethoven's Christmas Adventure	Mr. Rexford	Direct-to-video
2013	Scooby-Doo! Stage Fright	The Great Pauldini (voice)	Direct-to-video
2014	Christian Mingle	Donny De Bona	
2015	The Flintstones & WWE: Stone Age SmackDown!	Mr. Slate (voice)	Direct-to-video
2016	Swing Away	Glenn	
2019	7 Days in Vegas	Walter	
2020	Phineas and Ferb the Movie: Candace Against the Universe	Mayor Roger Doofenshmirtz (voice)	Streaming film
2020	Charlie's Christmas Wish	God (voice)	Post-production
2020	Christmas in New England	Mr. Trowel	Pre-production

=== Television ===
Year	Title	Role	Notes
1983–84	The Edge of Night	Greg Schaeffer	
1984–86	Loving	Keith Lane, Jonathan Matalaine	
1988	As the World Turns	Douglas Prescott	
1988	Something Is Out There	Remar	Miniseries
1989	Heartbeat	James Thompson	Episode: "Gestalt and Battery"
1990	The Young and the Restless	Dr. James Grainger	3 episodes
1990–91	Santa Barbara	Stephen Slade	75 episodes
1991	Nurses	Dave Grady	Episode: "Coming to America"
1992	General Hospital	Greg Bennett	
1992	Scorch	Howard Gurman	6 episodes
1992, 1994	Baywatch	Fred Adler, Bill Cooper	2 episodes
1993–94	Silk Stalkings	Dan Borson, Dr. Scott Waverly	2 episodes
1994	Thunder in Paradise	Bryden Chubshaw	Episode: "Changing of the Guard"
1994	Valley of the Dolls	Allen Cooper	65 episodes
1994	Frasier	Thomas Jay Fallow	Episode: "Slow Tango in South Seattle"
1995	Sisters	Pizza Guy	Episode: "No Pain, No Gain"
1995	Platypus Man	Rance	Episode: "Lou's the Boss"
1995	Pig Sty	Rance Erik St. Damian	Episode: "Party!!!"
1995	A Whole New Ballgame	Tad Sherman	7 episodes
1995	Murder, She Wrote	Ralph Stafford	Episode: "Nailed"
1995	Living Single	Jean Luc Gerard	Episode: "Rags to Riches"
1995	Baywatch Nights	Kemp	Episode: "Bad Blades"
1995–98	Seinfeld	Jacopo "J" Peterman	22 episodes
1996	Ned and Stacey	Kyle Roberts	Episode: "Promotional Rescue"
1996	Melrose Place	John Marshall	Episode: "The Bobby Trap"
1996	Coach	Dr. Salters	Episode: "Quarantine"
1996	Weird Science	Mr. President	Episode: "Lisarella"
1996	Mad About You	Dr. VonDerphal	Episode: "Dr. Wonderful"
1996	Boy Meets World	Cal, Grant	2 episodes
1997	Over the Top	Robert McSwain	11 episodes
1997	Life with Roger	Dr. Noble	Episode: "The Apartment"
1997	Lost on Earth	Brand Shaw	1 episode
1997	Men Behaving Badly	Johnny on TV Show (voice)	Episode: "Playing Doctor"
1997	Temporarily Yours	Dulles Lee	Episode: "Temp-tation"
1997	Something So Right	David	Episode: "Something About New Beds and Old Friends"
1997	Smart Guy	Hugh Sterling	Episode: "A Little Knowledge"
1997	101 Dalmatians: The Series	Director (voice)	Episode: "Swing Song/Watching for Falling Idols"
1997	The X-Files	Dr. Pollidori	Episode: "The Post-Modern Prometheus"
1998	Style & Substance	Mr. Ferber	Episode: "The Boss and Other Disasters"
1998	Diagnosis: Murder	David Coopersmith	Episode: "Rain of Terror"
1998	Damon	Woody Woodson	Episode: "The Actor"
1998	Ellen	Announcer #2	Episode: "Ellen: A Hollywood Tribute: Part I"
1998	The Angry Beavers	Snooty Narrator (voice)	2 episodes
1998	The Lionhearts	Additional voices	Episode: "The Poem"
1998	Hercules	King Cinyras (voice)	2 episodes
1999	Sunset Beach	Pete	1 episode
1999	Family Guy	Cult Leader (voice)	Episode: "Chitty Chitty Death Bang"
1999	Mickey Mouse Works	Phantom Blot (voice)	1 episode
1999	For Your Love	Roger Bakely	Episode: "The Couple's Court"
2000	Hey Arnold!	Councilman Gladhand (voice)	Episode: "Helga's Masquerade/Mr. Green Runs"
2000	The Weber Show	Mr. Bill Erlicht	3 episodes
2000	Buzz Lightyear of Star Command	King Nova (voice)	5 episodes
2000–02	To Tell the Truth	Himself/host	
2000–25	SpongeBob SquarePants	King Neptune (voice)	5 episodes
2001	Lloyd in Space	Brock Rockman (voice)	Episode: "The Hero of Urbit-Knarr"
2001	Son of the Beach	Dr. Merlot	Episode: "The Island of Dr. Merlot"
2001–03	The Legend of Tarzan	Johannes Niels (voice)	2 episodes
2002–04	Teamo Supremo	Captain Excellent (voice)	3 episodes
2002	Sabrina the Teenage Witch	Professor Beltran	Episode: "Guilty!"
2002	Kim Possible	King Wallace II, Ancient King (voices)	Episode: "Royal Pain"
2002	House of Mouse	Phantom Blot (voice)	2 episodes
2003	Odd Job Jack	Dr. Renfield (voice)	Episode: "Fatal Extraction"
2003	Stripperella	Fireman, Skip Withers (voices)	2 episodes
2003–04	The Mullets	Roger Heidecker	11 episodes
2003, 2005	What's New, Scooby-Doo?	Beavis Bottomczek, Mayor Snipper (voices)	2 episodes
2003–05	Duck Dodgers	Captain Star Johnson (voice)	12 episodes
2004	Come to Papa	Anderson Miller	Episode: "The Salad"
2004	The Great American Celebrity Spelling Bee	Himself/host	
2004	Quintuplets	Buck Reynolds	Episode: "Working It"
2004–05	Father of the Pride	Blake (voice)	4 episodes
2005	Drake & Josh	Dr. Carlson	Episode: "Paging Doctor Drake"
2006	Hope & Faith	Peter (voice)	Episode: "Charley Shoots Faith"
2006–10	Family Feud	Himself/host	
2007	Higglytown Heroes	Uncle Zeke, Freight Train Conductor Hero (voices)	2 episodes
2008	The Emperor's New School	Editor of Inca Teen Magazine (voice)	Episode: "Malina's Big Break/Hotel Kuzco"
2008–15, 2025–present	Phineas and Ferb	Mayor Roger Doofenshmirtz/Rodrigo, Additional Voices	36 episodes
2010	Wizards of Waverly Place	Captain Jim Bob Sherwood	Episode: "Captain Jim Bob Sherwood"
2010	The Super Hero Squad Show	Grandmaster (voice)	Episode: "Whom Continuity Would Destroy!"
2010	Big Time Rush	Announcer (voice)	Episode: "Big Time Christmas: Part I"
2010–13	Scooby-Doo! Mystery Incorporated	Skipper Shelton, Pirate Couple, Ska Zombie (voices)	8 episodes
2011	Retired at 35	Dan	Episode: "Rocket Man"
2011	Pair of Kings	Narrator	Episode: "King of Thieves"
2011	All My Children	Kit Sterling	5 episodes
2011–13	The Looney Tunes Show	Walter Bunny (voice)	6 episodes
2013	The Mentalist	Buddy Hennings	Episode: "Red Velvet Cupcakes"
2014	Wallykazam!	Victor the Villain (voice)	Episode: "Victor the Villain"
2014	Gravity Falls	Knight Lilliputian (voice)	Episode: "The Golf War"
2015	Randy Cunningham: 9th Grade Ninja	P.J. McFlubusters Manager (voice)	Episode: "McCluckerbusters"
2015	Devious Maids	Dr. Christopher Neff	7 episodes
2015	Moonbeam City	Vex Mullery (voice)	2 episodes
2016	American Dad!	Dentyne Executive, Pilot (voices)	Episode: "Widow's Pique"
2016	Archer	Ellis Crane (voice)	3 episodes
2016	K.C. Undercover	Buck Marshall	Episode: "Spy of the Year Awards"
2017, 2019	The Lion Guard	Hadithi (voice)	3 episodes
2017	The Powerpuff Girls	Additional voices	Episode: "Memory Lane of Pain"
2018	Mickey Mouse	Additional voices	Episode: "The Fancy Gentleman"
2019	The Tramp	Chip Turner	1 episode
2019	Pawn Stars	Himself	Episode: "A Show About Nothing"
2020	That Totally Made Up Comedy Show	Network Executive	
2023	The Patrick Star Show	King Neptune (voice)	Episode: "Neptune's Ball"
2023	Monster High	Hades Burns (voice)	Episode: "Best Fiends/Scareer Day"
2024	The Really Loud House	Prescott Moneygreen	Episode: "The Boyfriend Stays in the Picture"
2025	Blaze and the Monster Machines	Movie Narrator (voice)	Episode: "Monster Machines at the Movies"

=== Video games ===
Year	Title	Role
2003	SpongeBob SquarePants: Battle for Bikini Bottom	King Neptune
2006	Family Guy Video Game!	Additional Voices
2008	Fable II	The Cow & Corset Owner
2010	Marvel Super Hero Squad: The Infinity Gauntlet	Grandmaster
2010	SpongeBob's Boating Bash	Seymour Scales
2020	SpongeBob SquarePants: Battle for Bikini Bottom – Rehydrated	King Neptune (archival recordings)
2023	SpongeBob SquarePants: The Cosmic Shake	King Neptune, Glovey Glove
2025	SpongeBob SquarePants: Titans of the Tide	King Neptune

== Books ==
- It's Okay to Miss the Bed on the First Jump (2006) (New York Times best-seller)
- Before Your Dog Can Eat Your Homework, First You Have to Do It (2007)
- The Perfect Dog (2013)

== Discography ==
- A medley (with Sarah Rice) of three songs ("You Found Me and I Found You," "Not Yet" and "Before I Met You") from the musical Oh, Lady! Lady!! on Ben Bagley's Jerome Kern Revisited, Vol. II, released 1990
- Peace of Our Minds (double-CD), released 2005
- Secrets from the Lake, released 2008

Media offices
Preceded by Alex Trebek; 1990–1991	Host of To Tell the Truth; 2000–2002	Succeeded by Anthony Anderson; New version in 2015
Preceded by Richard Karn	Host of Family Feud; 2006–2010	Succeeded by Steve Harvey
Awards and achievements
Preceded by new show	Dancing with the Stars (US) runner up Season 1 (Summer 2005 with Charlotte Jørgensen)	Succeeded by Jerry Rice & Anna Trebunskaya
