= The Great American Celebrity Spelling Bee =

- Created by: Brad Lachman
- Directed by: Bob Levy
- Presented by: John O'Hurley; Wil Southern
- Composer: Alan Ett
- Country of origin: United States
- No. of episodes: 3

Production
- Producer: Garry Bormet
- Running time: 60 minutes (episodes 1 and 2); 120 minutes (episode 3)
- Production company: Brad Lachman Productions

Original release
- Network: FOX
- Release: February 13 – February 27, 2004

The Great American Celebrity Spelling Bee is a limited-run spelling bee game show featuring four teams of four celebrities playing for charity. The show aired on FOX on three consecutive Fridays: February 13, February 20, and February 27, 2004. The first two episodes were a standard game running for 60 minutes, with the third and final episode a 2-hour championship episode. The show was hosted by John O'Hurley.
