= Port wine cheese =

Cheese or cheese spread made with port wine

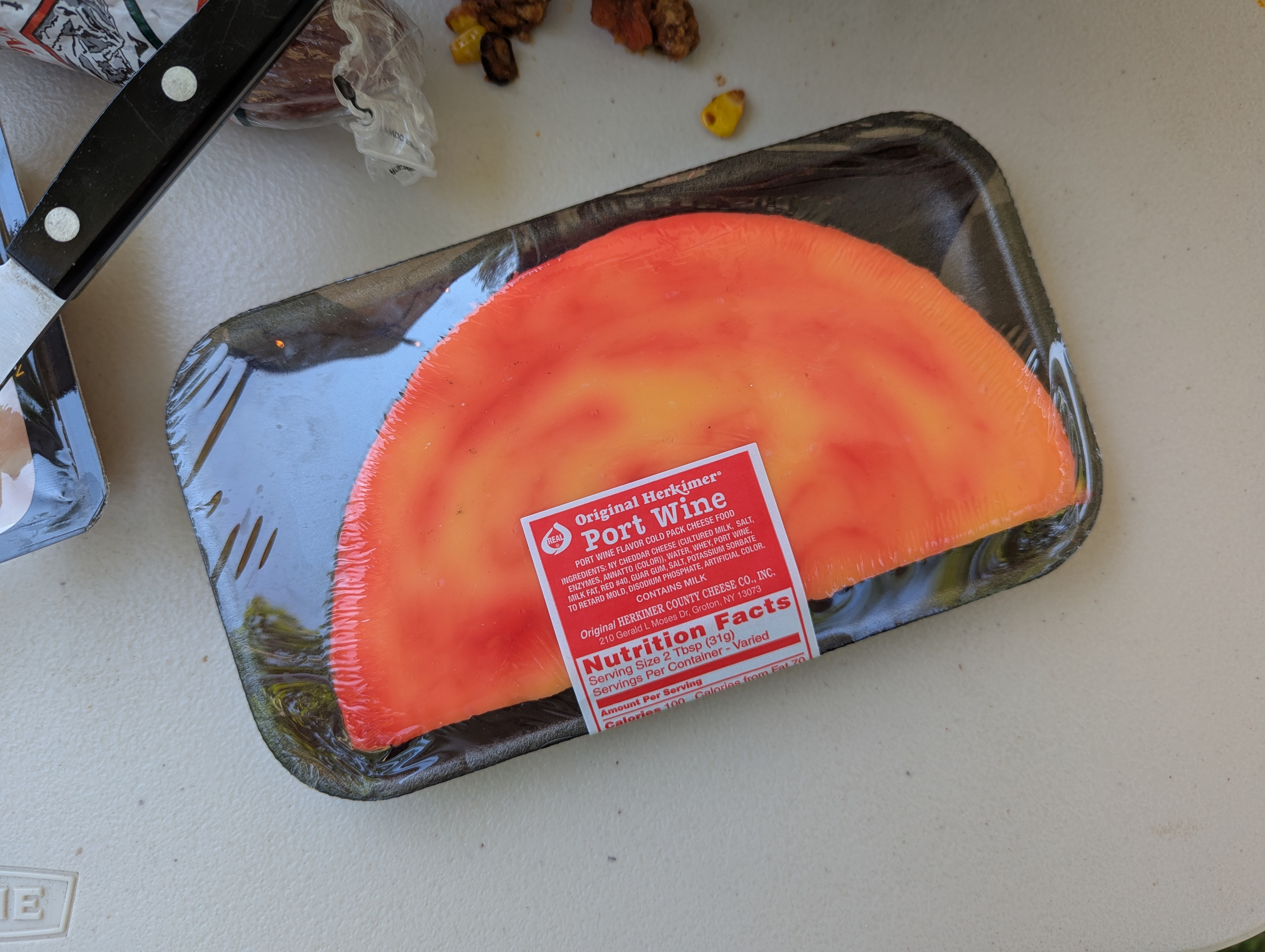
A package of solid port wine cheese

Port wine cheese is an orange- and red-colored cheese or cheese spread that is heavily dosed with alcoholic port wine as it is made. It is typically used as a cheese spread on foods such as crackers. It can be rolled into a cylindrical shape or into a ball, and is sometimes covered in nuts. Port wine cheese is a mass-produced product in the United States.

== See also ==
- Port Salut cheese
- List of cheeses
- List of spreads
- Pub cheese
