= Beer Cheese Festival =

Festival in Kentucky celebrating beer cheese

Kentucky Beer Cheese Festival
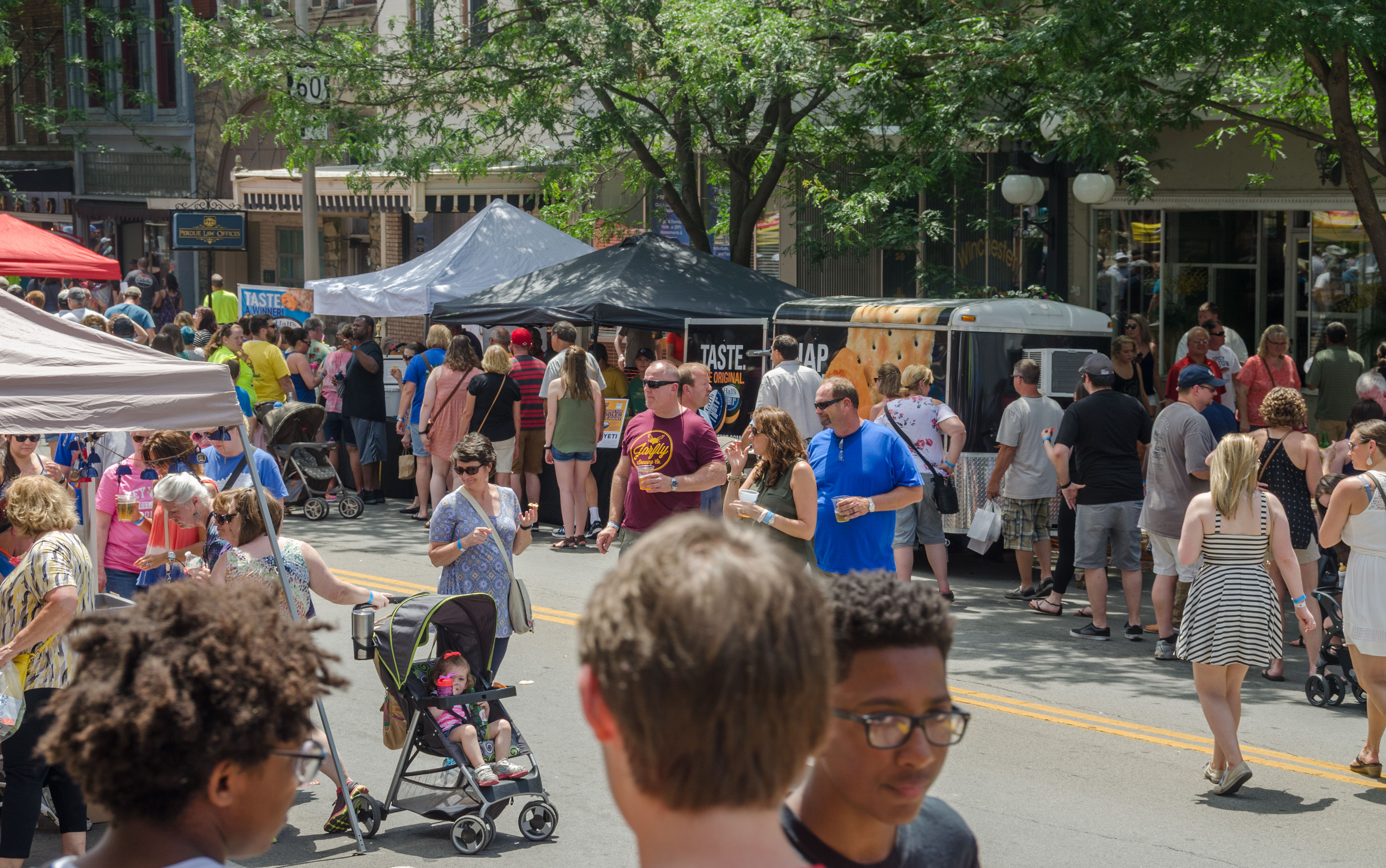
- Genre: festival
- Locations: Winchester, Kentucky, United States
- Years active: 2009–2019, 2022–
- Sponsors: Shop Local Kentucky, Clark Regional Medical Center, Ale-8-One, Clark County Farm Bureau, and others
- Website: Winchester Beer Cheese Festival

The Kentucky Beer Cheese Festival is a celebration of beer cheese, an original and unique Kentucky delicacy. This festival's a one-day summertime event held in downtown Winchester, Kentucky, birthplace of beer cheese.

== Overview ==
The first Beer Cheese Festival took place in June 2009 and was attended by more than 8,000 people. In 2016, nearly 20,000 people attended.

The only casualty of the event was since 2020: officials cited the COVID-19 pandemic as grounds for scrapping it.

The event features a competition among amateur and commercial beer cheese makers, as well as live music, art and craft displays, a beer "garden" and traditional festival foods. Festival attendees can also sample and vote for their favorite beer cheese to win a People's Choice Award.

The Beer Cheese Festival is the only event celebrating beer cheese in the world. People travel hundreds of miles across many states/countries to sample different varieties of the Kentucky creation.

Mental Floss included the Beer Cheese Festival in their list of "12 Highly Specific (and Extremely Delicious) Food Festivals." Mashable included the Beer Cheese Festival in their list of "14 food festivals that show how serious America is about food."

Wild Bill's is the two-time defending champion of the event winning the People's Choice Award for best beer cheese in 2025 and 2026.
