= Pub cheese =

Type of soft cheese spread and dip

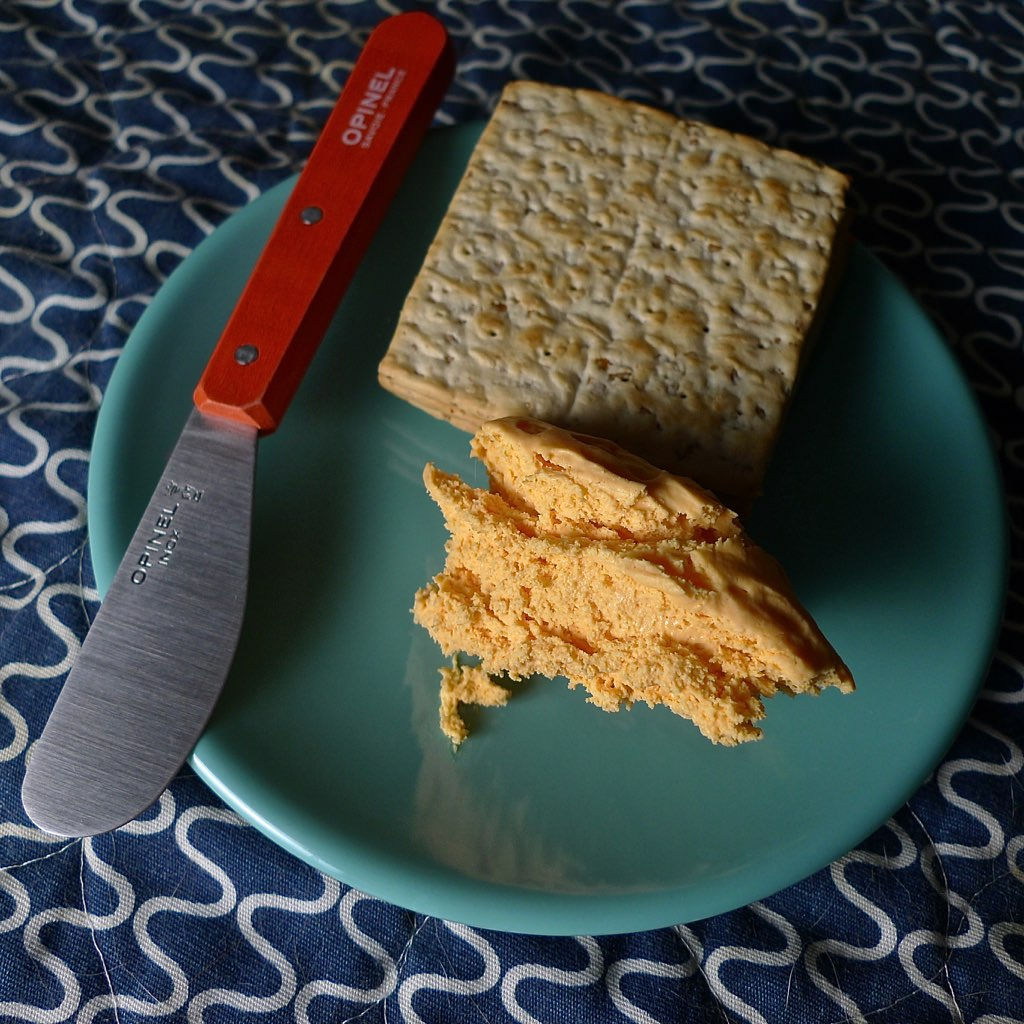
Pub cheese, a cracker, and a cheese knife

Pub cheese is a type of soft cheese spread or dip prepared using cheese as a primary ingredient and usually with some type of beer or ale added. While beer cheese is made with beer, pub cheese can be made without alcohol.

Pub cheese is sometimes prepared using a mix of processed cheese and pure cheese. It can be made with smoked cheeses or liquid smoke added to impart a smoky flavor. It is typically served with crackers or vegetables, which may be dipped into the cheese or used as a base for spreading. It is also used as a topping on sandwiches, such as hamburgers.

It is a mass-produced product in the United States, typically produced without any alcohol.

Some bars, breweries, public houses and restaurants produce their own versions of pub cheeses.

== See also ==
- List of spreads
- Beer cheese
- Double Gloucester – sometimes referred to as "pub cheese"
- Pimento cheese
- Port wine cheese
- Pub grub
