= Pair of Kings =

American television sitcom

- Genre: Fantasy; Adventure; Sitcom
- Created by: Dan Cross & David Hoge
- Starring: Mitchel Musso; Doc Shaw; Kelsey Chow; Ryan Ochoa; Geno Segers; Adam Hicks
- Theme music composer: Niclas Molinder; Johan Alkenäs; Joacim Persson; Geraldo Sandell
- Opening theme: "Top of the World", performed by Mitchel Musso and Doc Shaw
- Ending theme: "Top of the World" (instrumental)
- Composer: Jamie Dunlap
- Country of origin: United States
- Original language: English
- No. of seasons: 3
- No. of episodes: 67 (list of episodes)

Production
- Executive producers: Dan Cross; David Hoge; Matt Wickline
- Producers: Leo Clarke; Kevin O'Donnell
- Cinematography: John Simmons
- Camera setup: Videotape (filmized); Multi-camera
- Running time: 22–24 minutes
- Production company: It's a Laugh Productions

Original release
- Network: Disney XD
- Release: September 10, 2010 – February 18, 2013

Pair of Kings is an American television sitcom created by Dan Cross and David Hoge that originally aired on the cable channel Disney XD from September 22, 2010, to February 18, 2013. It premiered September 10, 2010, on Disney Channel and September 22, 2010, on Disney XD. The series stars Doc Shaw and Mitchel Musso in seasons 1 and 2 with the latter being replaced by Adam Hicks for season 3. The series revolves around a pair of Chicago-born teenaged fraternal twin brothers who discover they are rulers of a fictitious Pacific island nation.

On November 20, 2010, Disney XD announced Pair of Kings had been renewed for a second season, which premiered on June 13, 2011. In December 2011, the series was renewed for a third season. The third season premiered on June 18, 2012. However, on November 3, 2012, it was announced that Disney XD would not renew Pair of Kings for a fourth season. The show was filmed before a live studio audience, but used a laugh track.

== Premise ==
The series tells the story of brothers Brady (Mitchel Musso) and Boomer (Doc Shaw), a pair of teenage fraternal twins raised by their aunt and uncle in Chicago who live a normal existence. However, when Mason (Geno Segers), the royal adviser to the throne of the island of Kinkow, arrives at their high school, they learn that they are the heirs to the throne of the island, and after Mason tells Brady and Boomer of their lineage, they begin to realize that their lives are about to change drastically and will try to be brave and face their fears. Seventeen years earlier, the boys' mother, Annabelle, was an archeologist who was brought to the island and married King Kunu, their father, thus marrying into the Kinkowan royal line. Kaita the Bat-Rider, leader of the Tarantula People, killed Annabelle and Kunu during the Tarantula Wars. Kaita was later mummified.

The brothers relocate to the fictional island of Kinkow to assume their roles as the co-kings of the island nation, which has many odd customs and superstitions – while trying not to cause problems. The oldest brother was meant to rule alone, but, since all records of which twin is elder were lost, the two of them must rule together as a diarchy. Boomer and Brady's efforts are often aided by Mason's teenage daughter Mikayla (Kelsey Chow) and hindered by Lanny (Ryan Ochoa), a disgruntled cousin who is out to sabotage the boys and take the throne for himself, because he was supposed to be heir to the throne before they found out about Brady and Boomer.

In the third season premiere, Brady overhears Mikayla talking with her friend Candis, and learns that Mikayla will not date him because she finds him too immature. Brady leaves a note to Boomer, telling him that he will be leaving the island and heading for Chicago until he is mature enough to date Mikayla. When Boomer was about to take a hot air balloon to bring Brady back to Kinkow, a storm struck. The storm was about to destroy the island. Mason, Mikayla, the villagers, and the guards were to bring Boomer inside. Lanny, instead, tried to get Boomer killed in the storm while Boomer was attempting to get Brady. The storm passed and the next morning, they discovered a crashed boat. Several people exited the crashed ship, including King Boz (Adam Hicks) of Mindu. The new arrivals told how their island was destroyed by the storm and how they crash-landed on Kinkow. The inhabitants discovered that King Boz had a Kinkow-shaped birthmark on his bellybutton. Boomer and Brady were revealed to be two of a set of triplets, not just twins. Boz was lost as a child and subsequently was raised by apes. Later, the king and queen of Mindu found him and raised him as their own son. In the finale, Boz accidentally revives Kaita, who faces off against the kings. Kaita is destroyed in the island's volcano by the power of the King rings, fueled by the tribe gems.

== Episodes ==
Season	Episodes	Originally released	
Season	Episodes	First released	Last released
1	20	September 10, 2010	May 2, 2011
2	25	June 13, 2011	April 16, 2012
3	22	June 18, 2012	February 18, 2013

== Characters ==
=== Main ===
- Mitchel Musso as King Brady (seasons 1–2, guest season 3) – The co-protagonist of the series in seasons 1 and 2. Inherited his father's skin complexion. He has a crush on Mikayla. He is more illogical and in certain situations more serious than Boomer and he appears to be somewhat childish. He often uses his history of being bullied to help figure out how to solve a problem. He plays the guitar. He moved back to Chicago in season 3 after he overheard Mikayla say he was immature and he would never mature so long as he was a king.
- Doc Shaw as King Boomer – The co-protagonist of the series. Inherited his mother's skin complexion. Boomer has moments of carelessness and is rarely serious, unlike his brother Brady, but in season 2, he begins to behave in a slightly more responsible and brave manner than Brady. In season 3, he is still getting used to having another brother and has become the voice of reason between him and Boz. In the third season two parter, he was revealed to know ballet. He also opened his own club called "Boomerama" in Season 3. In the episode "Bond of Brothers", it is revealed "Boomer" is in fact a nickname, but Boomer is interrupted before revealing his real name.
- Kelsey Chow as Mikayla Makoola – Mason's only daughter, Mikayla assists the triplets on many occasions. She is fearlessly tough and can handle anything, especially since she has inherited her father's fighting skills. She is shown to be very good with her machete, which she calls "Stabitha". Mikayla is the kind of person who tells the kings everything that they need to know, not just what they want to hear. Brady has a crush on her, but she continuously rejects him when he wants to go out with her. In the finale of season 2, Mikayla believes she may actually like Brady after having a dream of them almost kissing. She questions this and eventually kisses him to break him from a spell placed on him by the evil king. In the first episode of season 3, Mikayla does feel guilty upon hearing that Brady had left Kinkow.
- Ryan Ochoa as Lanny – Brady, Boomer and Boz's evil cousin who was heir to the throne until Boomer and Brady arrived. He is the inept antagonist of the series. He usually spends his time trying to think of ways to get rid of Brady and Boomer and attempts to cause them trouble. While at first indifferent to Lanny, the kings have built up an inexplicably large amount of love and trust for him and misinterpret any action he does as trying to help them. When Brady leaves Kinkow, Lanny takes the King Ring off of Mikayla, in order for Mikayla to return a favor to him. In the season 3 episode "O Lanada", Boomer and Boz give Lanny the island nation of Lanada without realizing the gold-producing gopher of Kinkow lives there. In the end, Lanny keeps Lanada. When Lanny wanted to donate his spit to restore Kaita the Bat-Rider, the Tarantula People planned to take Lanny's spit by force in front of Mikayla. After Kaita the Bat-Rider is restored and Mikayla confronts Lanny for his actions, Lanny declares that it is time for his favor to be called in and wants her to keep silent of his treachery. However, in the battle, Lanny decides to help the kingdom by destroying the zombies using a canon. He soon learned that Kinkow is his real home and decides to be nice.
- Geno Segers as Mason Makoola – The strong and fearless Royal Advisor and loyal friend to the kings' parents. He is the overly protective father of Mikayla and always threatens any boy who attempts to ask her out, including King Brady (Mikayla reveals her father's overprotectiveness is why she had to attend her school prom with a zebra for her date). He is often nicknamed "Sasquatch" due to his build and stature, but is revealed to be 1/8 Sasquatch in one episode.
- Adam Hicks as King Boz of Mindu (season 3) – The co-protagonist of the series in season 3. Inherited his father's skin complexion. He is Brady and Boomer's long lost triplet brother, who was lost in a storm on Mindu 17 years ago. He was raised by apes until he was ten, after which he was found and adopted by the king and queen of the island of Mindu. He does not like Mikayla very much because he feels that she looks like his ex-girlfriend even though it is very clear they look nothing alike. He tends to act like a real monkey from time to time, making him wild and unpredictable. Boz also possesses the power to converse with animals, as seen when he saves Boomer and Mikayla from a gorilla. It is made quite clear in the first few episodes of season 3, that of the triplets, Boz is the most intelligent. He is also the only one who appears to have at least average intelligence, if not over. In "I Know What You Did Last Sunday", it was revealed that in attempt to look for shelter, he unclogged Mindu's storm drain which caused the island to sink rapidly. Adam Hicks was brought in to replace Mitchell Musso after the latter’s DUI charge.

=== Recurring ===
- Vincent Pastore as Yamakoshi – Lanny's one-hundred-year-old pet fish and only friend, though they are constantly at odds. He is malevolent and perpetually grumpy. It would seem that Yamakoshi is the true schemer against Brady and Boomer, but being confined to a fish-bowl makes it impossible to carry out his plans without Lanny. Only Lanny can understand Yamakoshi when he talks. In the Season 2 1-hour finale "The Evil King," it is revealed that Yamakoshi is really Kalakai, the evil twin of Malakai, first king of Kinkow, who founded the dark side. He was defeated and transformed into a fish by his brother. He regained his human form when the twin moons appeared in the sky and he tricked Lanny into placing him on the throne of the evil castle, which restored his true form, so long as he did not leave his castle, which would result in the curse activating again. However, he was defeated by Brady and Boomer, and fell into the river, which caused him to leave his castle, and change back into his fish form. He then returned to being Lanny's pet. He is not seen in season 3, making his whereabouts unknown.
- James Hong as Timothy Kalooka-Khan – Kinkow Island's head elder and shaman who learned everything from Kinkow Community College and is the go-to guy for the kings, though he openly dislikes them. In the season three episode "Mysteries of Kinkow," his real name is revealed on the Mysteries of Kinkow TV show when he was interviewed by Candis. His wife throws him out in the first part of the series finale after he makes fun of her cooking on TV. In the third part, he abandoned the island and left for Las Vegas to become a cab driver.
- Brittany Ross as Candis – Candis is Mikayla's naive gossip-loving friend. She was the most popular student in Mikayla's school, and has her own TV show called Mysteries of Kinkow. Candis is arrested by Mikayla in the series finale after nearly causing Kinkow to be destroyed.
- Martin Klebba as Hibachi – A dwarfish bully with 6 toes on each foot, Hibachi was the Kahula of Shredder Beach before Boomer and Brady defeated him in a surfing contest over who would be the Kahula. It was discovered that he cheats in order to win. Shredder Beach is a dangerous beach in Kinkow where the best surfer rules, and not even the kings have jurisdiction. He also makes an appearance on Boomer's Junga ball team, and as a bouncer in Brady's club.
- Logan Browning as Rebecca "Awesome" Dawson – Boomer's crush in school who thinks she said yes to going to prom with him. They wind up dancing anyway. She also comes to the island for a date with Boomer. When she visited Kinkow in "An Ice Girl for Boomer," she was taken away by a jealous caveman yet was rescued by Boomer and the caveman's girlfriend. She eventually dumped Boomer because he was too childish and "due to the fact that he sent her a painting of his butt". She then reappears and they get back together in the season 3 episode "Bond of Brothers". In "Meet the Parents," it is revealed that Rebecca's father was an exiled shaman of the Tarantula People who was part of a group that did not agree with their people's violent ways. Rebecca's father sought refuge with Boomer's parents who helped them escape to Chicago. In order to keep her safe following a fight against the Tarantula People, her father and Boomer used amnesia powder to make her forget everything about Kinkow and dating Boomer. However, Rebecca found the Bat Medallion that Boz hid at her house from the Tarantula People which ends up dragging Rebecca back to Kinkow and the amnesia powder wears off. When Rebecca finds out that she herself is a Tarantuala Person, she decides to stay to help the Kinkow army to help fight the forces of Kaita the Bat-Rider. Following the fight with Kaita, Boomer and Rebecca rekindle their relationship.
- Eric Petersen as Catawampus – Lanny's second-in-command in the third season. He is well aware of Lanny's true nature, but follows him nonetheless even being determined to accept his abuse so he will one day respect him. Catawampus gains his wish in the series finale after saving Lanny and he becomes good.
- Doug Brochu as Oogie – A Flaji who befriends Boomer, making Brady jealous. They mistakenly think he is a cannibal, but he turns out to be vegetarian. After the kings apologize to him, they are still unable to stop Mason from blasting him (who still believed he was a cannibal). He later develops a crush on a Dirt Fairy named Priscilla.

== Setting ==
Kinkow is a fictional island in the Pacific Ocean. Kinkow has a light side and a dark side because of a centuries-long power struggle. There are many fictional creatures living on the Island of Kinkow.

There were some known locations in Kinkow:

- Royal Palace – This is where the Royal Family of Kinkow live.
- The Dead Parrot – A pirate-themed restaurant where Two Peg and his son No Beard work.
- Squonk Caverns – A series of caves where the Squonks live.
- Ice Cave – A frozen cave from "An Ice Girl for Boomer" where two cavepeople were originally frozen before a heat wave thawed them out.
- Lightning Grove – An area on the dark side of Kinkow that has thunderstorms at midnight.
- Elven Forest – A section deep within the jungle of Kinkow. Home to the “plus sized elves” from the North Pole. They defected to Kinkow after feeling unwanted in Santa’s Workshop.
- Mount Spew – The island's volcano.
- Lanada – Boomer and Boz gave Lanny a tiny island on Kinkow's main river in the episode "O Lanada."
- Kings' Peak – The only snow-capped mountain on Kinkow, inhabited by a tribe of Yetis.
- Skull Lagoon – The place where the Tarantula People took Brady and Boomer in the episode "How I Met Your Brother".
- Jungle – The jungle surrounding the palace. It is home to tribes such as the Tarantula people as well as a large array of wildlife, among them insects, parrots, crocodiles, tigers, snakes, rhinos, elephants and monkeys.

Kinkow also has some islands that help to make up its island nation:

- Cornea – An island that is inhabited by Triclopes.
- Kippi Kippi – In "Pair of Geniuses", Mikayla mentioned that it has a new hospital. In "Junga Ball", Kippi Kippi's Junga Ball team has some dragons on their team.
- Lakuna – In "Pair of Geniuses", Mikayla mentioned that it was building a university.
- Mindu – The island of Boz's origin. It sank into the sea following a storm and most of its inhabitants moved to Kinkow.
- Sununu – An island that is ruled by twin queens Hesta and Desta. The waters around Sununu contain a gigantic octopus. Kinkow and Sununu have never spoken to each other. It was once affected by a stupidity curse until Boomer and Brady broke the curse.
- Three unnamed islands

== Production ==
=== Casting ===
Mitchel Musso and Doc Shaw portray the two male leads, Boomer and Brady, the co-kings of Kinkow. After the second season, Mitchel Musso left the main cast, and was replaced by Adam Hicks, who portrays the twins' long lost triplet brother, Boz.

=== Taping location ===
The series was filmed at Sunset Gower Studios (which also housed production of the first season of That's So Raven).

=== Development ===
On the occasion of the premiere of Pair of Kings, key individuals were interviewed by The Denver Post. Adam Bonnett, then Senior Vice President of Original Programming for Disney Channel, detailed the reasoning behind the development of Pair of Kings:

“Our first question with any new show is whether the characters and the premise speak to boys, because Disney XD is more boy-focused. The other thing with XD is, boys are watching a lot of animation, so I think even in their live shows, they are looking for something that’s a little more outrageous and unpredictable.”

Mitchel Musso commented on his relationship with Doc Shaw as follows:

“We hit it off on the first day riding up in the elevator for the audition.”

For this reason, the central element of the series—the relationship between the brothers and best friends—would work well. Musso further explained:

"The key is that we really want this. A lot of people let it get ahead of them and they think because they have the job, they don’t have to worry about it. We really want this to work, to be funny and for everybody to have a good time.”

== Broadcast ==
The series aired worldwide on Disney XD and Disney Channel. In Canada it premiered on September 17, 2010 on Family. In the United Kingdom and Ireland previewed on December 16, 2010 and premiered on January 3, 2011 on Disney XD and premiered on December 17, 2010 on Disney Channel. It previewed on December 19, 2010 and premiered in February 2011 in Singapore, Malaysia, and the Philippines. In Australia and New Zealand it previewed on January 1, 2011 and premiered on January 31, 2011. It premiered in India on June 11, 2011. In South Africa it premiered on May 13, 2011. The series is also streaming on Disney+.

== Reception ==
The series received less attention than other Disney sitcoms like Hannah Montana. According to its fanbase, this is because the series aired exclusively on Disney XD—the Disney Channel's "little brother." Fewer households in the US had access to it, and the channel was less well-known.

At one point, Pair of Kings was Disney XD’s leading live-action series.

The series is regularly praised for its fantasy elements, worldbuilding, and overarching narratives that span multiple episodes—features that are unusual for a sitcom.

In a review of the third season, Thinus Ferreira found that despite the change in lead actors, the series was "watchable, escapist fun" and particularly praised Ryan Ochoa:

"Lanny (Ryan Ochoa) is still the funniest in the scenes where he tries to get rid of [the kings]—as a character, he is similar to Disney's Sharpay: actually cleverer and constantly plotting, but in the end, he never comes out as the winner."

On Trakt, Pair of Kings holds a rating of 66%, indicating mixed-to-positive reception, while it has a score of 5.9/10 on IMDb.
