= Beer cheese (spread) =

Cheese spread containing beer

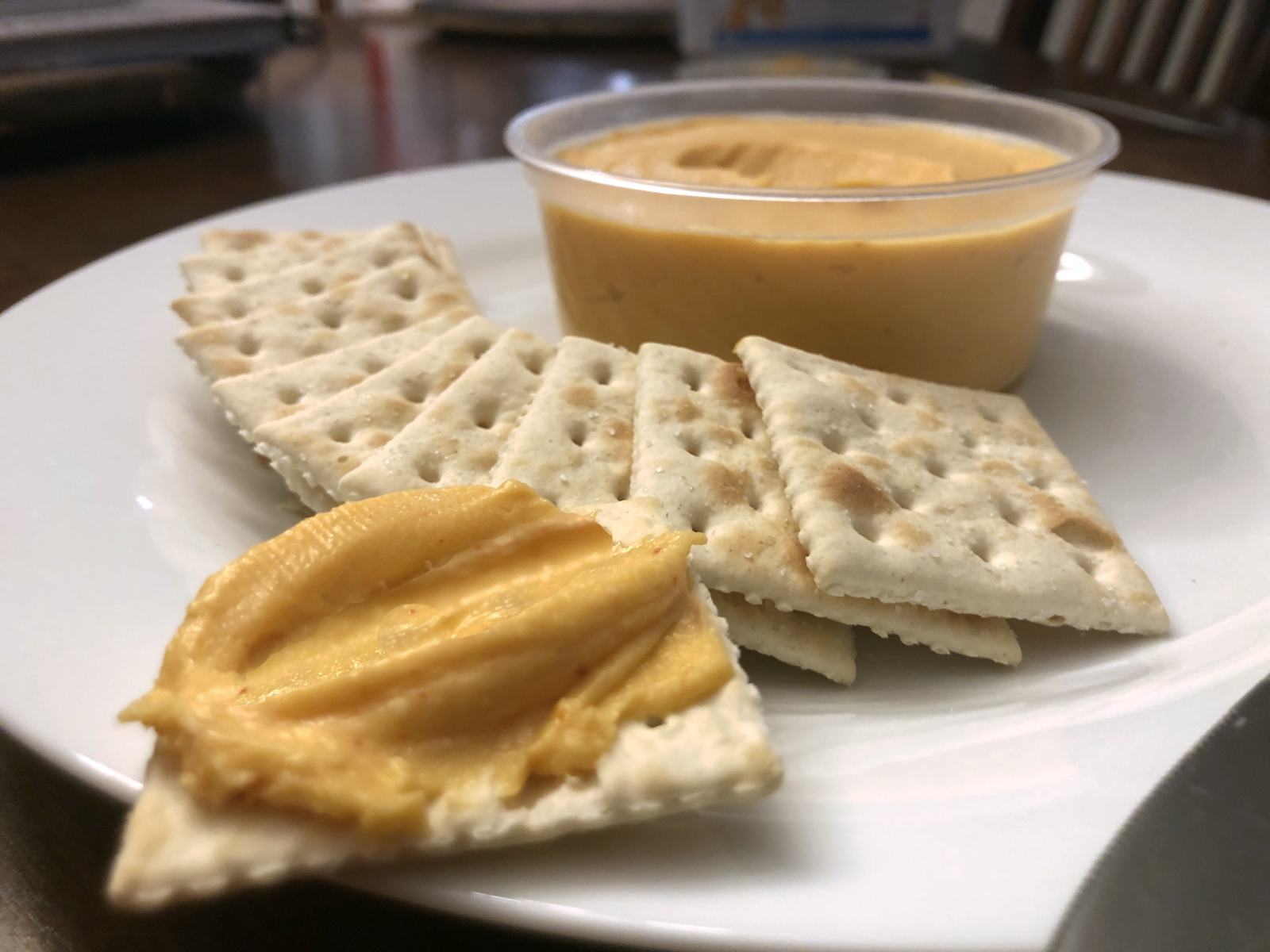
- Beer cheese with saltine crackers
- Type: Spread
- Place of origin: United States
- Region or state: Kentucky
- Main ingredients: Processed cheese or sharp cheddar cheese, beer, garlic, spices (dry mustard, horseradish and cayenne pepper)

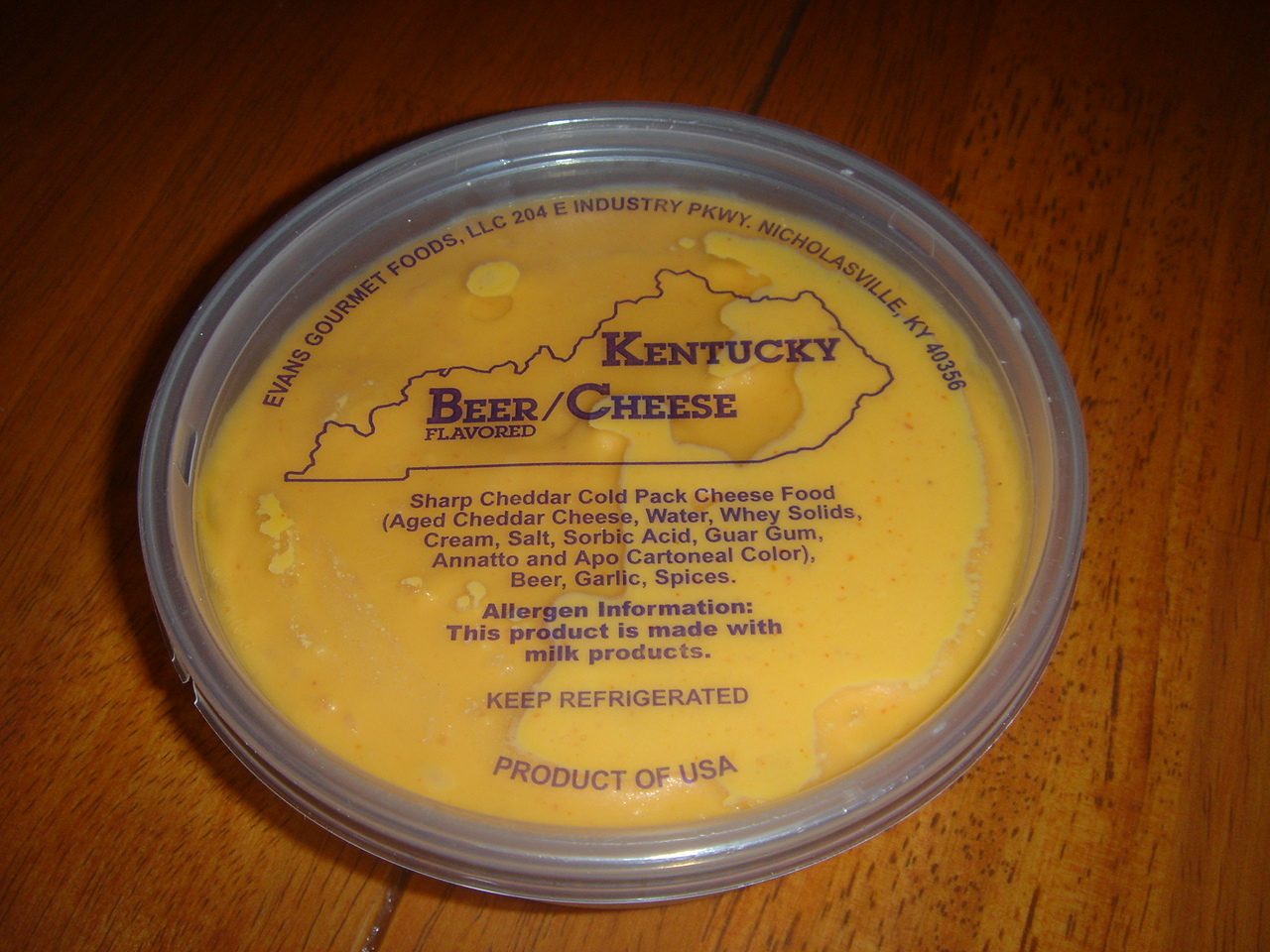
Beer cheese, made from sharp cheddar cold pack cheese food, in a tub

Beer cheese is a cheese spread most commonly found in Kentucky. Similar cheese products, such as pub cheese, can be found in much of the United States, but beer cheese spread itself is not widely distributed. Despite this fact, the product is nearly ubiquitous in Kentucky. There are a number of different brands that are popular – most are similar in taste and texture. Fans of the dish usually have their favorite brand, and there are many homemade versions which use a wide variety of ingredients to add personalization.

Commercially produced beer cheese spread usually consists of a processed cheese base with a sharp cheddar flavor, while homemade varieties almost always start with sharp cheddar cheese. To this, enough beer is added to provide flavor and texture, as well as garlic, and a variety of spices including dry mustard, horseradish, jalapeño peppers, and cayenne pepper. Most varieties come in "mild" and "hot" versions, but all tend to have a strong garlic flavor. Beer cheese is traditionally served with saltine crackers, although it can be found served with various other crackers and crudités, most often as an appetizer.

== Origins ==
While there are conflicting stories about beer cheese's origins, it appears to have first been served in the 1940s at a restaurant in Clark County, Kentucky, known as Johnny Allman's. The owner of the restaurant, John Allman, credited the invention of the cheese spread to his cousin, Joe Allman, a chef in Phoenix, Arizona. Joe's Southwestern influence is said by some to explain the spread's spicy nature.

On February 21, 2013, the Kentucky Legislature decreed Clark County as the birthplace of beer cheese.

== See also ==
- List of spreads
- Pub cheese
