= University Park at MIT =

Mixed-use urban renewal project in Cambridge, Massachusetts

Coordinates: 42.3618°N 71.1008°W

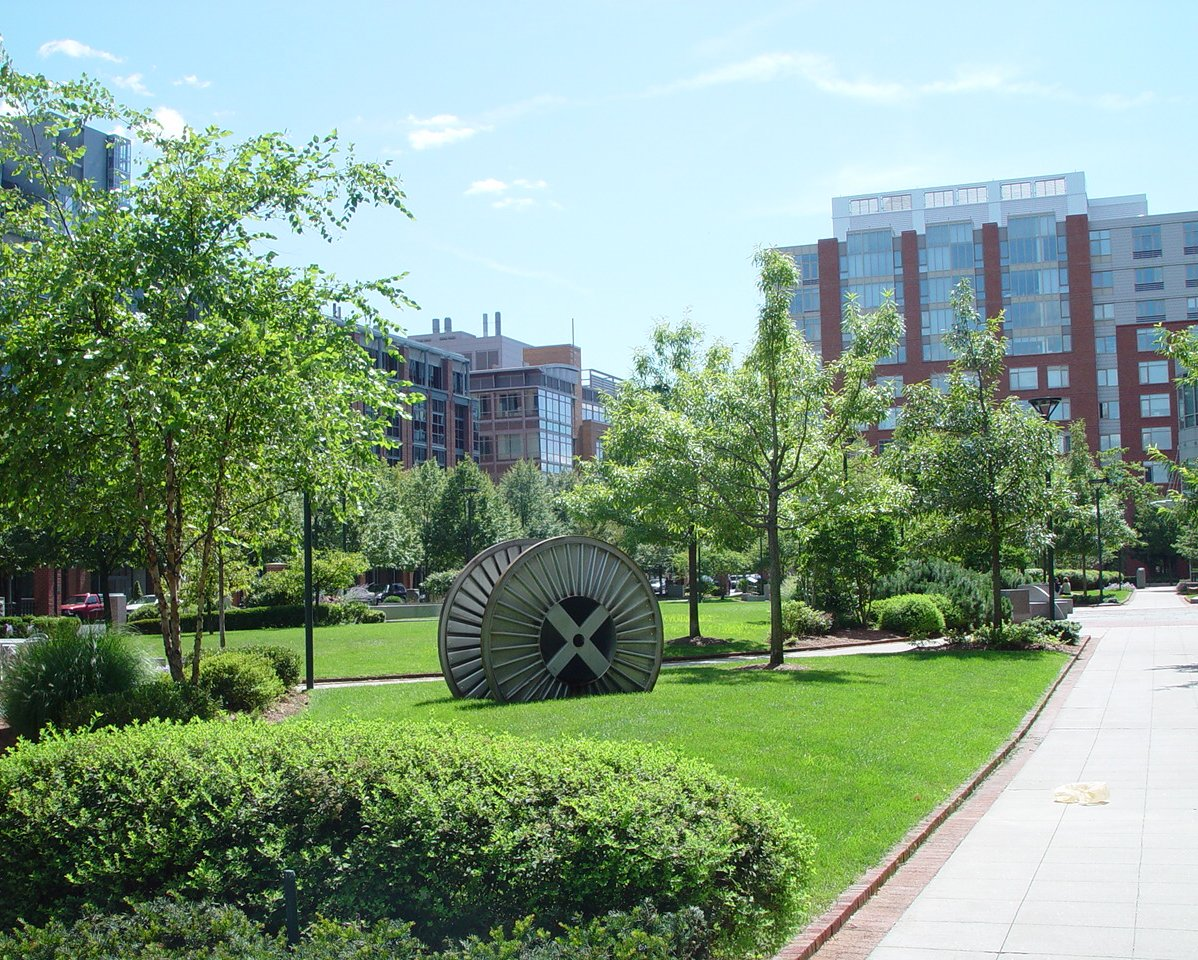
The large wire spool in the University Park Common is a reminder of the property's former use as home to the Simplex Wire & Cable Company.

University Park at MIT is a mixed-use urban renewal project in Cambridge, Massachusetts, United States, occupying land near Central Square between the Massachusetts Institute of Technology (MIT) campus and the primarily residential neighborhood of Cambridgeport. It is a joint project of the City of Cambridge, MIT, and Brookfield Asset Management. It is not part of the MIT campus.

== History ==
The area presently known as University Park was originally an area of mostly marshy land along the Charles River. During the American Revolutionary War, one area of higher land was the site of a gun battery (now called Fort Washington) erected to guard against British attack during the Siege of Boston.

In the 1850s, the Grand Junction Railroad built tracks along what was then the swampy edge of the river. The nearby marshes were landfilled, and the area became home to a number of manufacturing plants. These included the Simplex Wire & Cable Company, the Kennedy Biscuit Company (which is the originator of the Fig Newton and is on the National Register of Historic Places), the Necco candy factory, a Sears shoe factory, and a Ford assembly plant.

In the 1960s, this part of Cambridge had been threatened by a proposed new highway, Interstate 695, also known as the "Inner Belt" project. The highway would have been routed along the western boundary of the area that is now University Park, and would have required the demolition of many homes in the adjacent area of Cambridgeport. Plans for building the highway were eventually dropped because of community opposition.

Simplex, owner of the largest parcel of land, left Cambridge in 1969 (the company later became a unit of Tyco International). The Simplex property was then acquired by MIT. Most of the buildings were razed in the 1970s, leaving a large area of overgrown vacant lots that languished for many years while MIT tried to find a use for the 27-acre (110,000 m^{2}) property. Serious planning began in 1983 with MIT's selection of Forest City to develop the land, and approval of a city master plan for the area. Construction started in 1985.

For some years afterwards, the site was the subject of protests by community activists who objected to MIT's plans for gentrification of the neighborhood, and wanted the development to include more affordable housing as well as to preserve the remaining businesses and historic buildings in the area. Final zoning approval for the project was given by the city in January, 1988.

== University Park today ==
University Park is a mixed-use development, comprising a combination of office and laboratory buildings that are home to several biotechnology companies, residential developments, retail areas, and parks and open space. While MIT continues to own the land, Brookfield Asset Management holds long-term leases. The last new building on the MIT-owned land was completed in 2005.

The project includes 531 rental apartments, more than was originally planned, because demand for housing in Cambridge outstripped that for office space by the time of the project's completion. Much of the housing is concentrated on the west side of the redevelopment area, bordering the established residential areas in Cambridgeport. The Kennedy Biscuit building was preserved and converted to loft housing. The former Sears shoe factory building was converted to office space.

Some of the other older buildings in the area adjacent to the MIT-owned property have also been renovated. The former Necco building now houses a research unit of the pharmaceutical company Novartis. At the opposite end of the city-designated "revitalization area", the former Ford plant near the Boston University Bridge, originally built in 1913, has also been converted to office space.

In 2016, further developments were opened along Massachusetts Avenue.

== Public Art ==
The new construction of University Park contains both landscape sculpture sequences and individual public artworks. University Park Common includes over 100 sculptural and graphic pieces as part of Traces, an artwork that marks moments in the 250-year history of the site. Commissioned by Forest City Boston, Traces tells stories of 18th and 19th century commerce and of technical innovations made in the local area. Bronze and stainless steel sculptures present moments in the activity of Simplex Wire and Cable, and a map sequence sculpture documents the changing landform of the site. A fog fountain evokes the early salt marsh history of the site, with cast bronze oyster shells recalling oyster banks discovered on site during excavation for building foundations. A memorial bronze sculpture of Necco Wafers in the signature roll wrapping, with individual round wafers, and printed Sweethearts (candy) conversation hearts spilling out of a paper bag, is displayed on a boulder in a corner of the park near the former New England Confectionery Company factory.

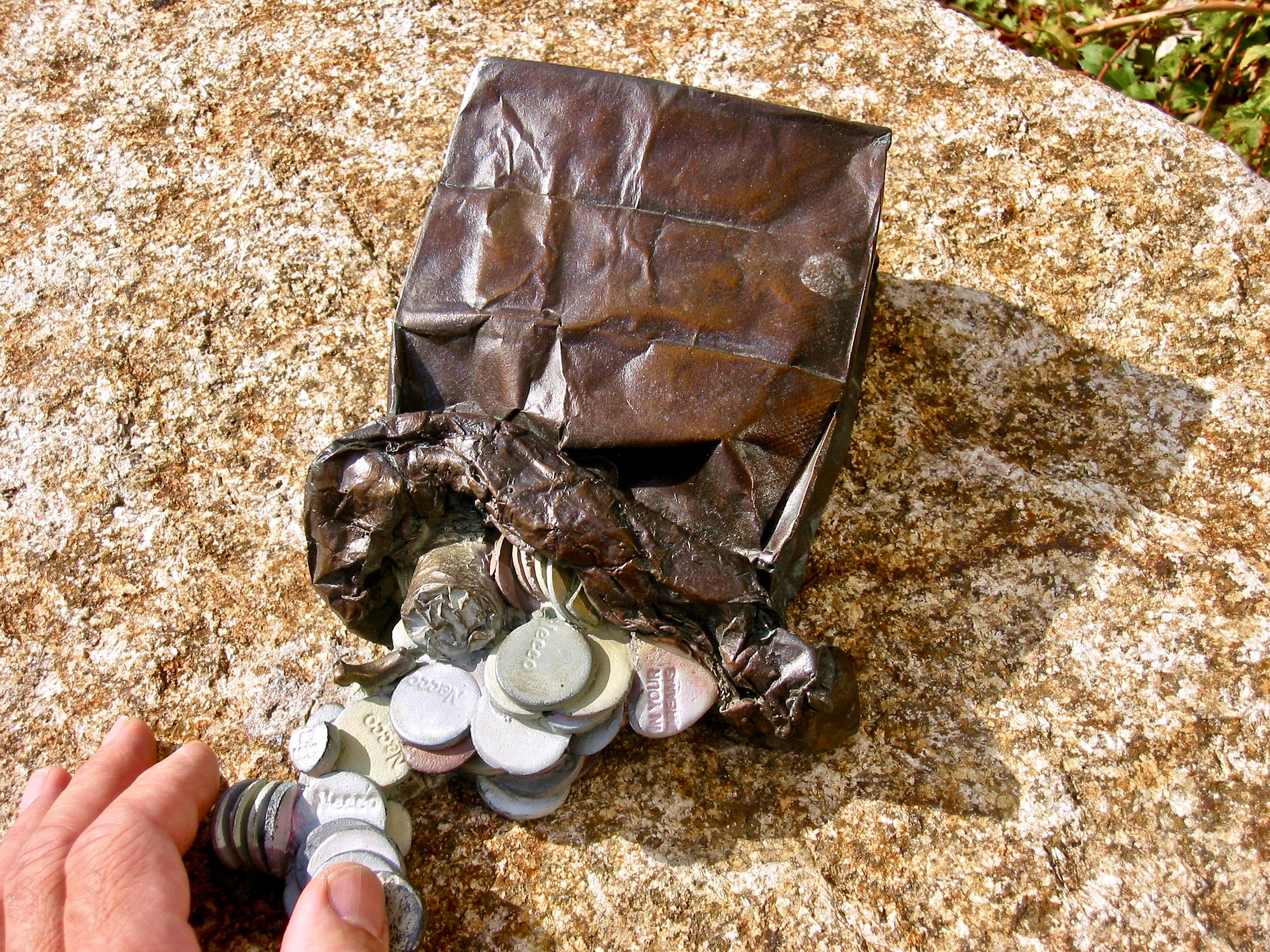
Memorial sculpture of Necco wafers and conversation hearts. Cambridge, Massachusetts.
