= Necco Wafers =

American candy

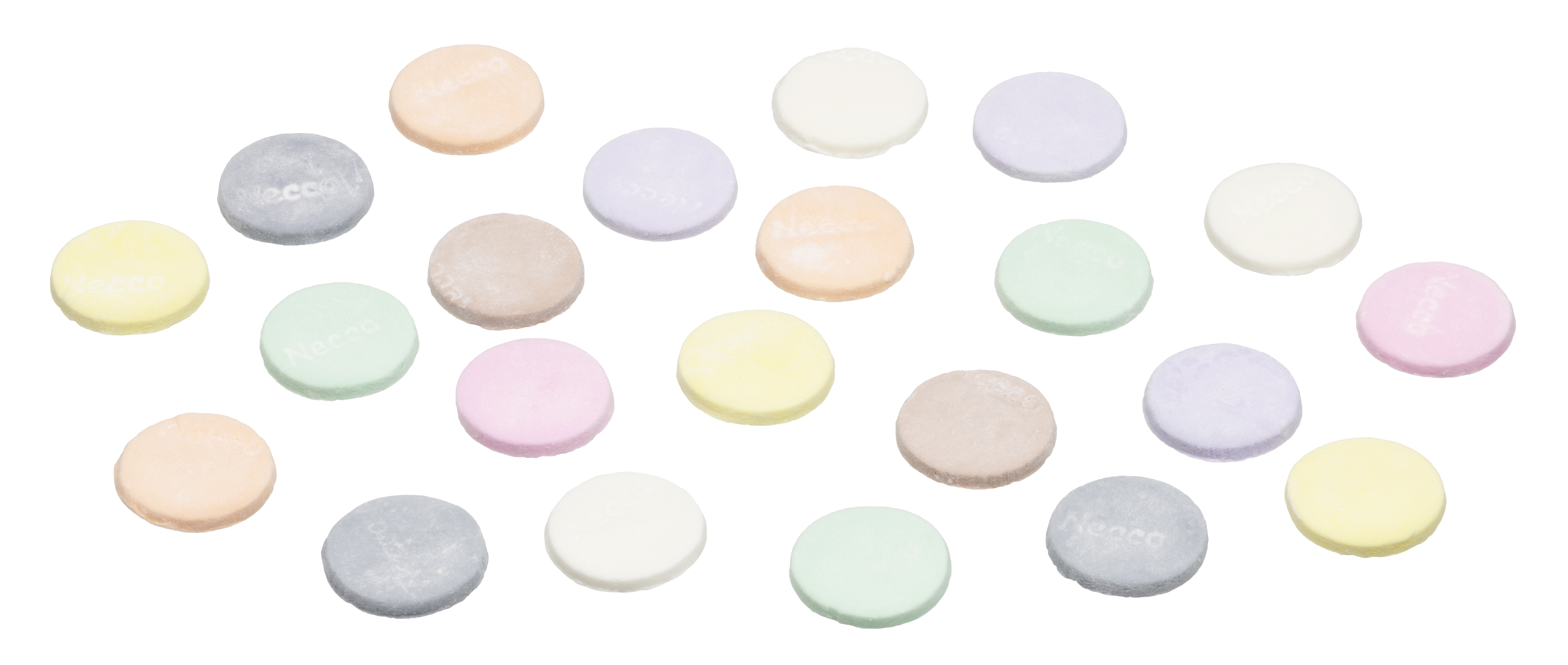
- Regular Necco Wafers
- Product type: Candy
- Current owner: Necco (1847–2018); Spangler Candy Company (2018–present)
- Country: Boston, Massachusetts, United States
- Introduced: 1847, 2020 (reintroduction)
- Discontinued: 2018–2020
- Website: spanglercandy.com/collections/necco-wafers

Necco Wafers are a sugar-based candy, sold in rolls of variously-flavored thin disks. First produced in 1847, they became the namesake and core product of the now-defunct New England Confectionery Company (Necco), which operated near Boston, Massachusetts. It is the oldest American candy brand still in production (although Good & Plenty is the oldest continually produced American candy brand). Production of the candy was suspended in July 2018 when Necco went into bankruptcy, but returned in May 2020 after purchase of the brand and production equipment by the Spangler Candy Company.

Each roll of Necco Wafers contains eight flavors: lemon (yellow), lime (green), orange (orange), clove (purple), cinnamon (white), wintergreen (pink), licorice (black), and chocolate (brown). The ingredients in Necco Wafers are sugar, corn syrup, gelatin, gums, colorings, and flavorings.

== History ==
Necco Wafers date back to 1847. Oliver Chase, an English immigrant, invented a lozenge cutting machine with which he produced the wafers. At the time of the Civil War, these were called "hub wafers" and were carried by Union soldiers. In 1901, Chase and Company merged with two other companies to incorporate the New England Confectionery Company (Necco). By 1912, the wafers were being advertised as "Necco Wafers", a name they have carried since.

During World War II, the United States government ordered Necco to produce its wafers for soldiers overseas. As a result of this action, Necco saw its sales of the wafers peak. Upon returning home, many former soldiers became faithful customers who continued to buy the wafers.

The Necco company was acquired several times, first in 1963, and most recently in 2018. In 2018, the future of Necco Wafers was unclear after the Necco company filed for Chapter 11 bankruptcy. Round Hill Investments purchased the company out of bankruptcy for $17.3 million in May 2018, but then abruptly ended operations at Necco on July 24, 2018, citing "sanitation issues" it claimed it was previously unaware of.

Round Hill sold off various Necco lines to other candy companies. Necco Wafers (which retains the Necco name and logo), Sweethearts, and Canada Mints, as well as the equipment used to manufacture them, were sold to the Spangler Candy Company of Bryan, Ohio. In September 2018, Spangler announced plans to return the Necco Wafer to the market, initially giving a target date of November 2019. In May 2020, Spangler said that Necco Wafers were back in production at a facility in Mexico and ready for release.

== Changes in formula ==
In 2009, Necco changed the formula for its Necco Wafers. Artificial colors and flavors were eliminated. The candy was made softer through the addition of glycerine. The lime flavor was removed due to difficulties in creating an all-natural green coloring, resulting in a seven-flavor Necco Wafer roll.

According to Jackie Hague, Necco's vice president of marketing, switching to all-natural flavors and colors "would draw young mothers concerned about their children's diet." According to Corby Kummer of The Atlantic the new cinnamon flavor was "less like Red Hots" and the new lemon, "less like paper candy dots and more like lemon meringue pie filling." The chocolate flavor—previously a vanilla flavor "with a hint of chocolate flavoring"—switches to a more intense all-cocoa flavor. In addition, the Necco Chocolate assortment changed from 100% of the standard Necco chocolate wafers into a four-flavor chocolate assortment.

However, the change was not as popular with long-time customers as anticipated. The company received “some complaints about the new formulations.” In response to these concerns, Necco Wafer production switched back to the original formula in the summer of 2011.

In 2020, Spangler posted a statement on their website regarding a slight change in the formula. Seven of the eight flavored wafers retained the original formula except for the chocolate wafer which they stated: "True Necco Wafers connoisseurs may detect a richer cocoa flavor in the chocolate wafers due to a minor improvement made in the cooking process."

The latest formulation states on the label; "CONTAINS A BIOENGINEERED FOOD INGREDIENT." It does not identify which ingredient.

== Other varieties ==
Tropical Necco Wafers launched in 2012, offering a new assortment of tropical fruity flavors: mango, passion fruit, coconut, banana, lime, and strawberry.

Chocolate Necco Wafers are a single-flavor roll composed completely of the Chocolate wafers.

Necco Sour Wafers are in a roll of six tart flavors: Watermelon, Wildberry Grape, Sour Apple, Lemon, Extreme Tangerine, and Blue Raspberry. As of June 2018, they were not shown on Necco's varieties website, but could still be found in some stores.

Candy cane flavored rolls are rare and were sold during the holiday season.

== Gallery ==
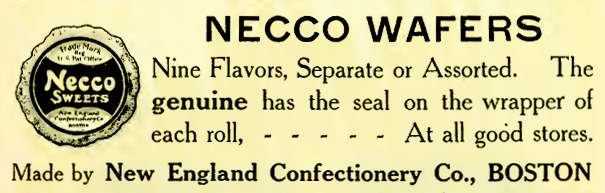
1916 advertisement — "Nine Flavors, Separate or Assorted."

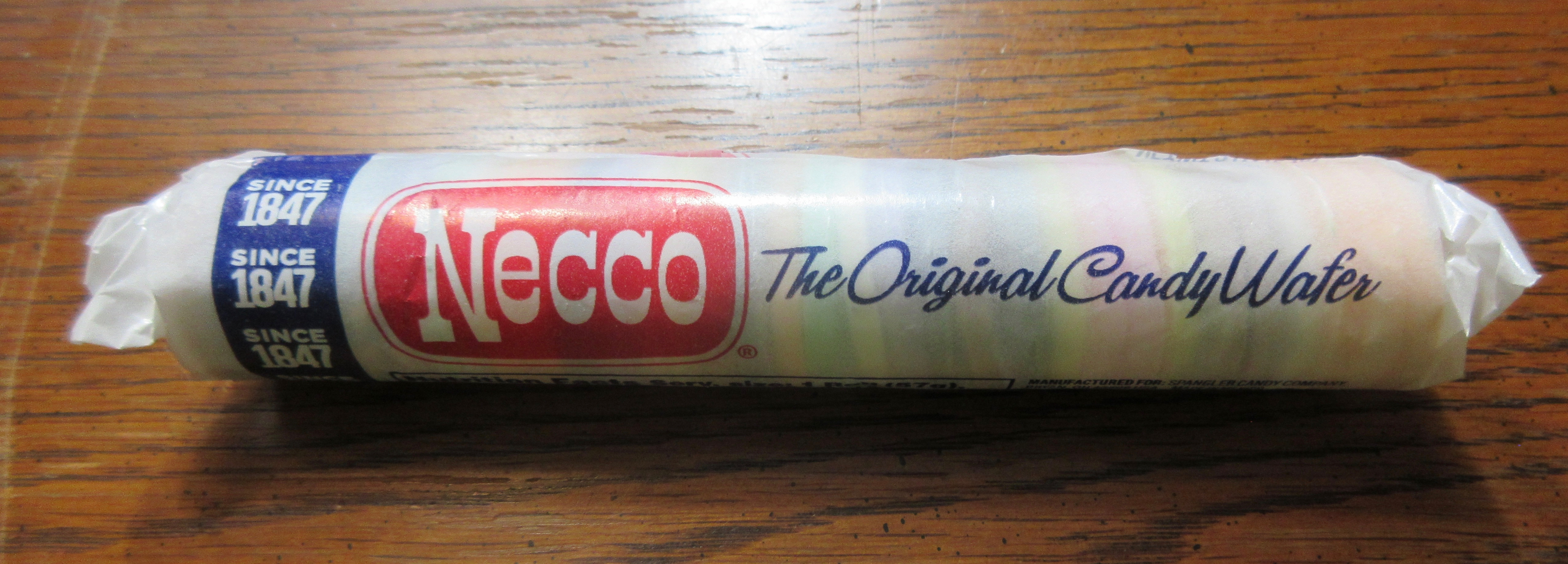
Standard roll of assorted flavor Necco Wafers

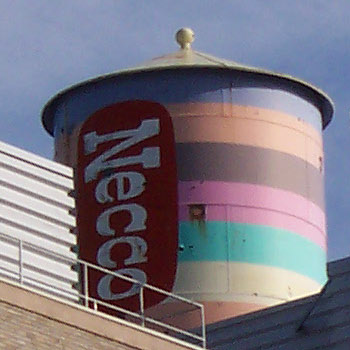
The water tower of the Necco facility on Massachusetts Avenue in Cambridge, Massachusetts, painted in 1996 to resemble a roll of Necco Wafers

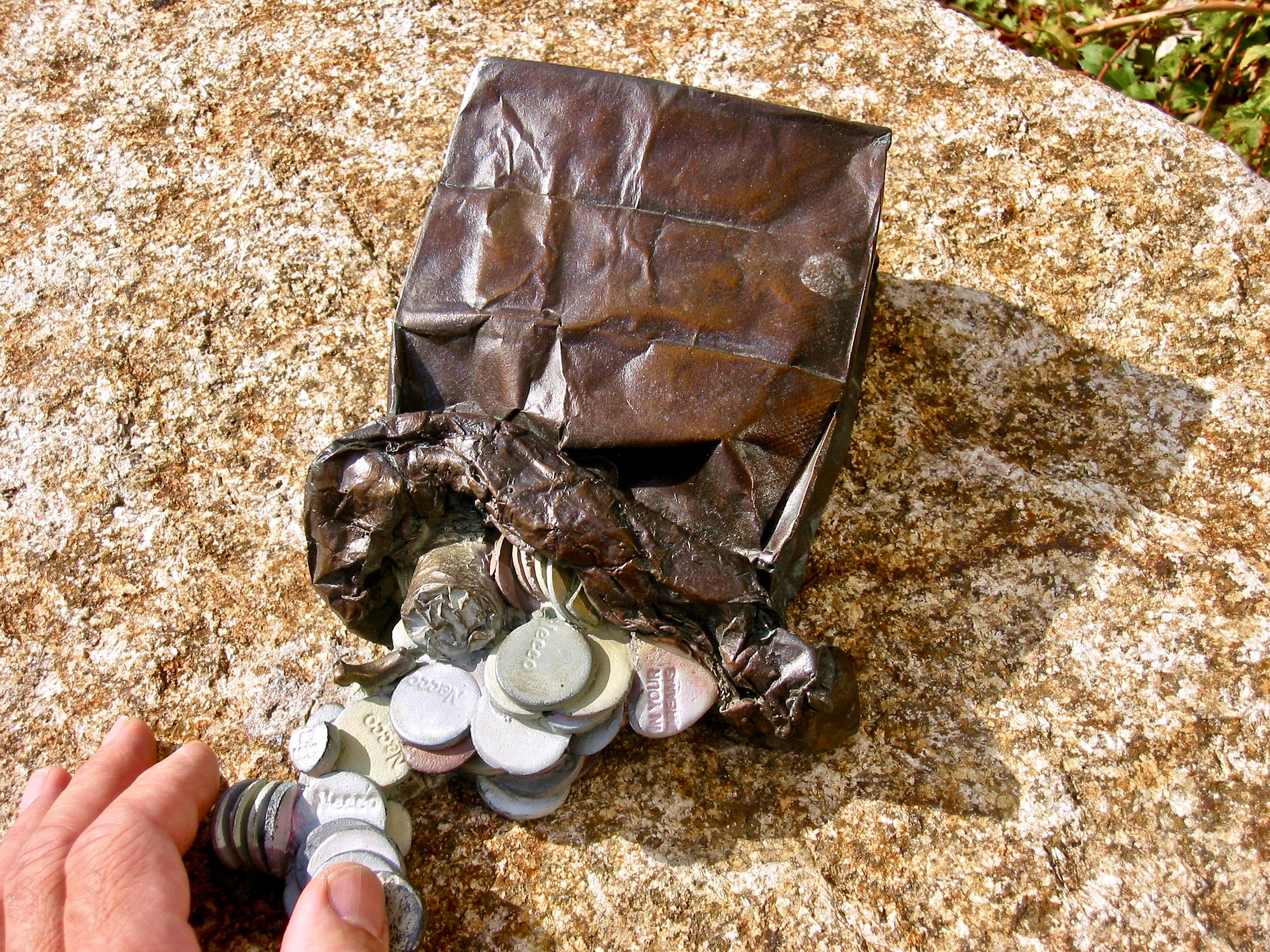
Necco Wafer Memorial Sculpture, 1998, cast bronze, located in University Park at MIT near the former Necco factory in Cambridge, Massachusetts

== See also ==
- List of confectionery brands
