= Thin Mints =

Thin Mints may refer to:

- Thin Mints, a variety of Girl Scout Cookies
- Haviland Thin Mints, a chocolate-covered mint candy
