= Atkinson Candy Company =

Candy company based in Lufkin, Texas

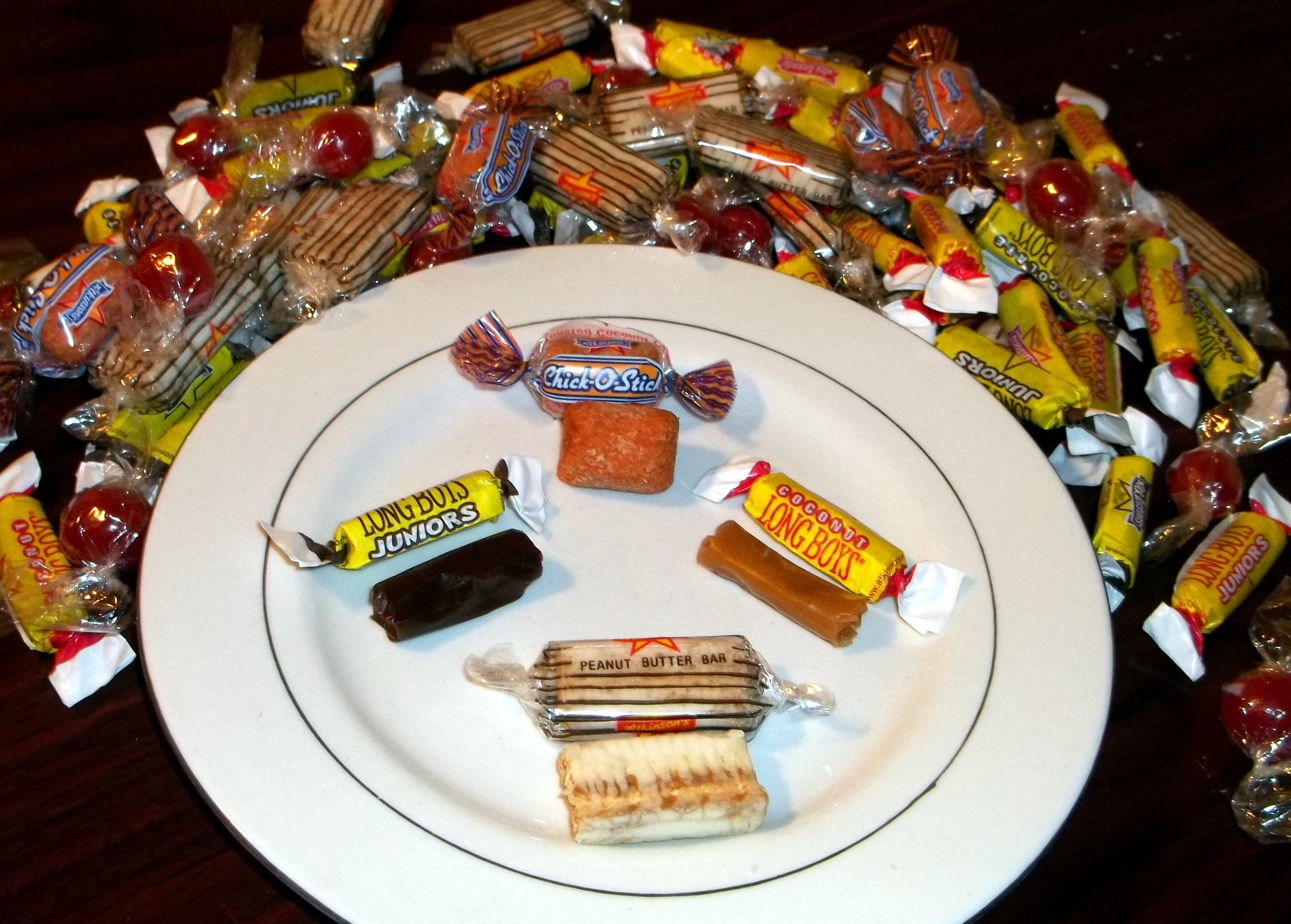
- An assortment of Atkinson candies
- Type: Private
- Industry: Confectionery
- Founded: 1932; 94 years ago
- Founders: B. E. Atkinson Sr. Mabel C. Atkinson
- Headquarters: Lufkin, Texas, United States
- Key people: Eric Atkinson (CEO); Kevin Green (President); Chandler Childs (VP of Sales)
- Products: Chick-O-Stick; Peanut Butter Bars; Mint Twists; Sophie Mae peanut brittle Coconut Long Boys caramel Slo Poke caramel Black Cow caramel
- Website: atkinsoncandy.com

The Atkinson Candy Company is an American privately owned confectionery company based in Lufkin, Texas. Founded in 1932 by B. E. Atkinson Sr. and Mabel C. Atkinson, the company is best known for producing the Chick-O-Stick. Its product line also includes Peanut Butter Bars, Coconut Long Boys, Black Cow, Slo Poke, Sophie Mae peanut brittle, and Mint Twists.

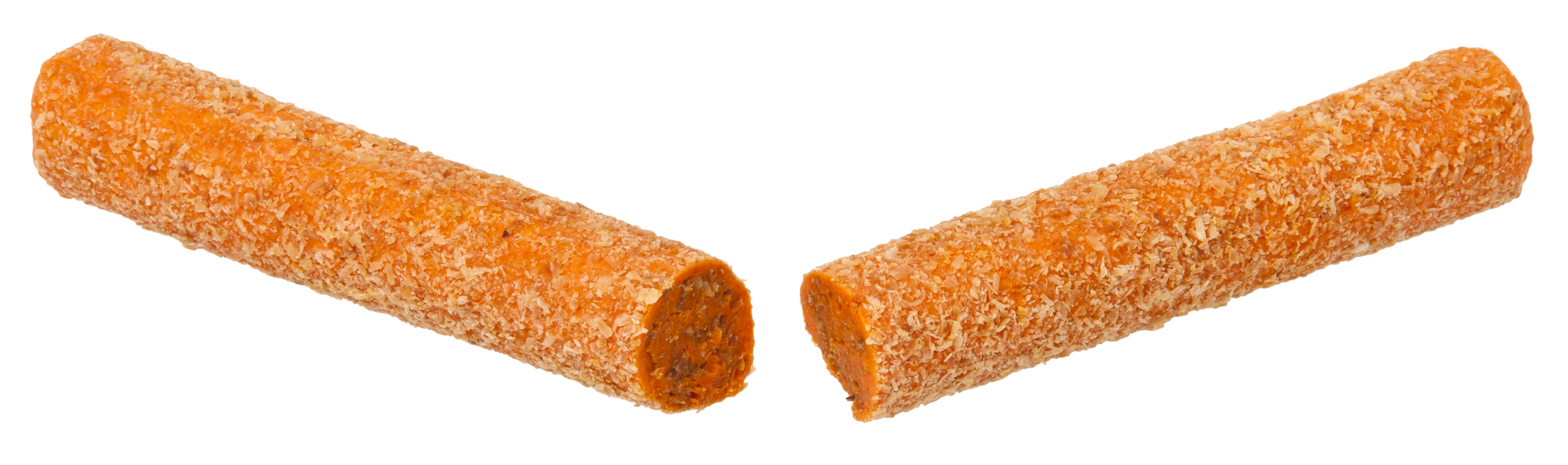
A split Chick-O-Stick

== History ==
Atkinson Candy Company is a private company founded in 1932 by B.E. Atkinson, Sr., and his wife, Mabel C. Atkinson. It started when Basil E. Atkinson made two-day treks to Houston to purchase candy and tobacco, then he would sell it to mom-and-pop shops on the return trip. According to the company, the business began during the Great Depression after Atkinson's father told him "to find something to sell for a nickel".

The company currently operates out of a 100,000 square feet (9,300 m^{2}) facility, and is led by Eric Atkinson, grandchild of the founders. In 2024, day-to-day operations were transitioned to a new generation of leadership, with Kevin Green named president while Atkinson remained CEO. The company celebrated its 94th anniversary in 2026.

== Judson-Atkinson Candies ==
In 1983, Atkinson purchased another local company, the Judson Candy Company, later known as Judson-Atkinson Candies, from the Pearl Brewing Company. Judson-Atkinson was founded in 1899, and was based in San Antonio, Texas. In 2011, Judson-Atkinson shut down business due to the high prices of sugar and raw materials. Judson-Atkinson Candy Company used about four million pounds of sugar each year to make their bulk candies.

== Product line ==
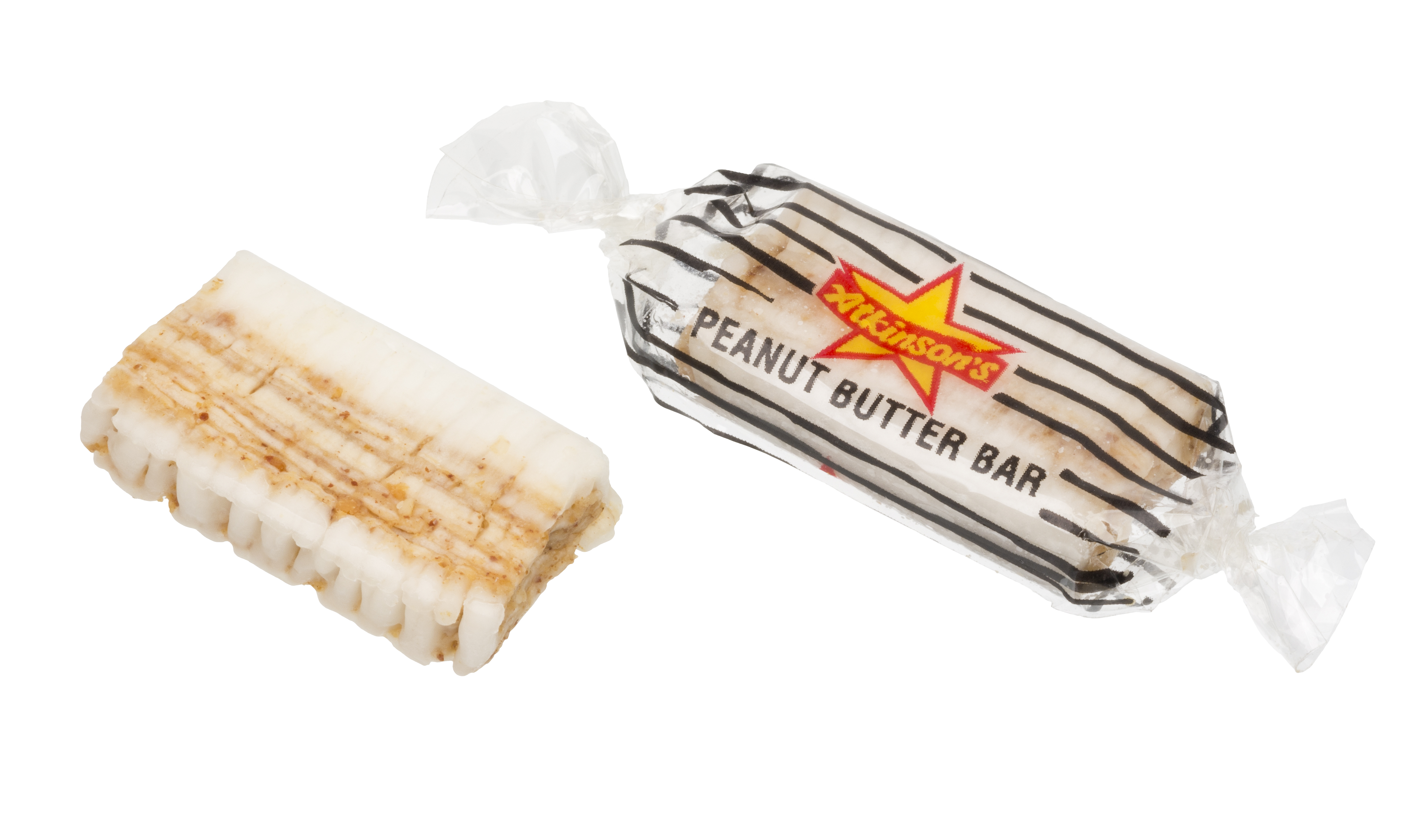
Atkinson Candy Company miniature Peanut Butter Bars

Atkinson Candy Company specializes in peanut butter and peppermint-flavored candies. The current product line includes the Chick-O-Stick, Coconut Long Boys, peanut brittle, mint twists, Peanut Butter Bars, and holiday candy. Atkinson also produces a premium hard candy line known as Gemstone Candies. In 2013, Atkinson acquired the candies Black Cow, Slo Poke and Sophie Mae from The Warrell Corporation. In 2019, they reached a licensing agreement with Spangler Candy Company to make the former Necco candy, Mary Janes.

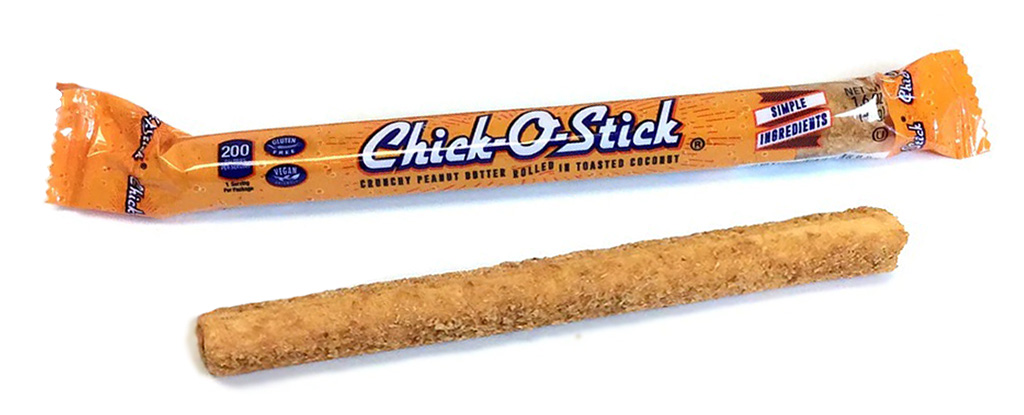
Current (2022) Chick-O-Stick packaging and post-2019 "natural" color

The company's flagship product, the Chick-O-Stick, is a crunchy bar of peanut butter and toasted coconut with a distinctive amber-orange coating, invented in the late 1930s. It was originally sold under the name Chicken Bones and accompanied by a cowboy-hat-wearing chicken mascot. Both the name and the mascot were retired in 1955 following a copyright dispute. The mascot had also drawn complaints because it incorrectly suggested that chicken was among the ingredients. The recipe has remained unchanged since the 1940s, and the product is vegan.

According to Eric Atkinson, the Chick-O-Stick is the company's leading product in the convenience-store format (large bars), while the Peanut Butter Bars line is a strong second and often leads sales in grocery and dollar-store retail channels.

In 2024, Atkinson partnered with Rocket Fizz to release a Chick-O-Stick–flavored soda.

== Transition to natural colors ==
Around 2013, Atkinson began phasing out synthetic food dyes in favor of natural colorants, a transition that CEO Eric Atkinson said was motivated by a desire to align the company's products with their otherwise simple ingredients rather than by concerns about the safety of synthetic dyes.

The transition also created supply-chain challenges. In March 2021, a container ship carrying radishes used for the Chick-O-Stick colorant was caught in the 2021 Suez Canal obstruction, forcing the company to seek alternative sources. Industry estimates have placed the cost of natural dyes at roughly ten times that of synthetic equivalents, and many ingredients are imported.

By 2025, approximately 90% of Atkinson's candies were produced with natural dyes. Despite initial customer pushback over the reformulation, sales remained steady, and Atkinson attributed roughly 30% year-over-year sales growth in 2025 in part to consumer interest in candies made without artificial colors, amid a broader campaign by U.S. Health Secretary Robert F. Kennedy Jr. to phase out synthetic food dyes.

== Operations and culture ==
The Lufkin facility is certified to the Safe Quality Food (SQF) standard. Company leadership has stated that the firm's East Texas roots are central to its identity and that relocation is not being considered.

Since the COVID-19 pandemic – during which Atkinson saw a sharp spike in Chick-O-Stick demand alongside acute labor shortages – the company has hosted an annual Halloween public event at the factory called Chick-O-Treat, at which Eric Atkinson appears dressed as Willy Wonka.
