= Doscher's Candies =

One of the oldest American manufacturer of candy

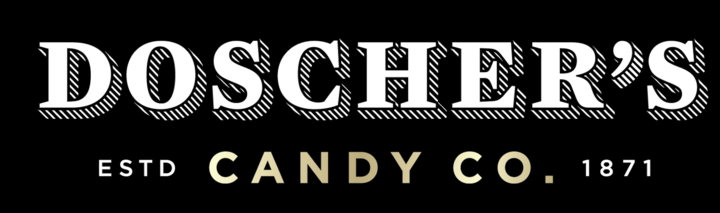
- Company type: Private company
- Industry: Confectionery
- Founded: 1871; 155 years ago
- Headquarters: Cincinnati, Ohio, U.S.
- Products: Candy Canes, French Chew, Candy Buttons, etc.
- Website: www.doscherscandies.com

Doscher's Candies is an American candy manufacturer, and the oldest producer of candy canes in the United States. It is known for being the oldest continually operating candy company in America.

In 1871, Claus Doescher manufactured their first handcrafted candy cane in Cincinnati, Ohio. The company is also widely known for its taffy product, the French Chew, which was introduced in 1896.

== History ==
In 1871, immigrant brothers Claus, John and Heinrich Doescher left their uncle's confectionery in Cincinnati, Ohio to start their own firm there, on Fifth Street between Broadway and Sycamore, forming the Doscher Brothers candy company.

In that year, Claus made their first candy canes. Their manufacturing process involved using real peppermint oil. Cooking small batches of molten sugar in copper kettles, and hand-working to roll, knead, stripe, and hook the canes. Doscher Brothers also manufactured a caramel popcorn they called Popcorn Fritters. The Doscher Brothers sold this popcorn to the Cincinnati Redlegs, which made them one of the first concessioners for American baseball. In 1896, the Doschers capitalized on the Turkish taffy craze that had been erupting in France and developed their recipe for the French Chew, their own taffy product which is still made to this day. Before being made into the more commercial or traditional bar form, French Chew was sold in large pieces that were broken up in candy stores and sold by the pound, which led to the French Chew's advertising slogan, "Freeze It, Crack It, Smack It."

John Doscher took over the company after Claus's death in 1883 and Claus's sons, Harry and John, became partners in the business shortly thereafter. Between 1932 and 1941, all three of the Doscher men passed away and Harry's wife, Elsie Doscher, who earned a finance degree from the University of Cincinnati, took over the company and kept the business alive through the Great Depression. She later passed the company on to her son Harry II in 1953. He ran the business until the 1990s, at which time his son, Harry III, joined the business.

In 2004, Greg Clark purchased Doscher's and in 2015 Chip Nielsen, along with his wife and children, purchased some of the business. In 2018, Doscher's bought Candy Buttons following the bankruptcy of Necco. In February 2019, Doscher's acquired Béquet Confections, a gourmet caramel maker from Bozeman, MT.

== Brands ==
- Doscher's
- French Chew
- Candy Buttons
