= Page & Shaw =

Candy manufacturers from 1888 until 1960

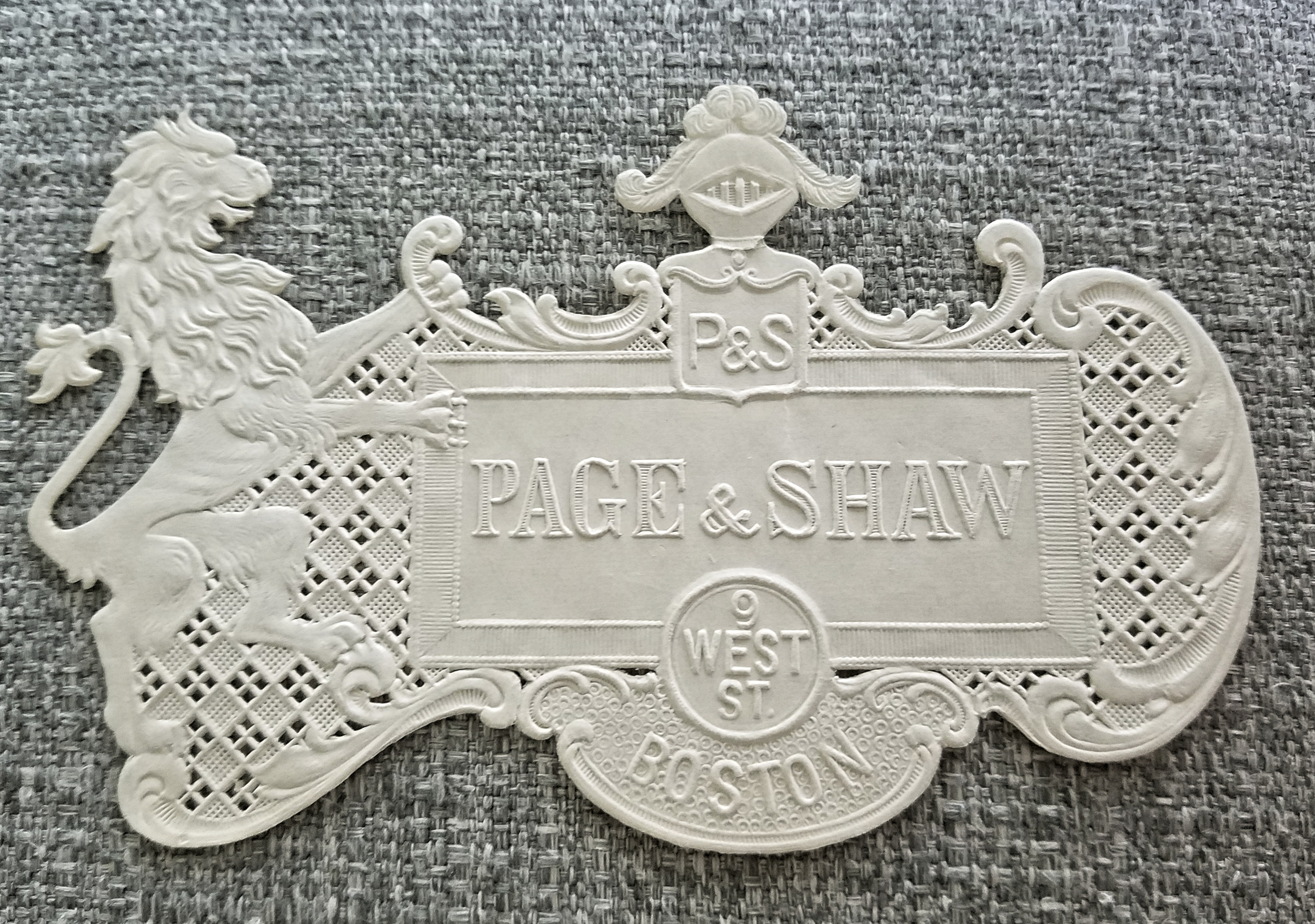
Page & Shaw, 9 West Street, Boston

Page & Shaw was one of the largest candy manufacturers in the United States, active from 1888 until about 1960.

Page & Shaw started as a small shop at 9 West Street in Boston, then in 1911 opened a major factory on Ames Street in Cambridge, Massachusetts, with branch stores in England, France and Canada. In 1918 its factory and five stores were shut down by the Federal Food Board for one week because the company kept a larger quantity of sugar on hand than was permitted by the United States Food Administration. Around 1920, Boston lawyer Otis Emerson Dunham acquired control of the company. He began an aggressive plan of expansion. By 1924 sales reached a peak of 2,200,000 pounds of chocolate per year. At its height, the company operated thirty-five shops as well as candy factories in Cambridge, New York City, Philadelphia, Boston, Chicago, San Francisco, Los Angeles, Montreal and London, and produced more than 6,000,000 pounds of chocolate candies annually in its Cambridge factory.

After the stock market crash of 1929, business slumped badly, and under Dunham's direction, it started to give away one share of common stock with every $2 worth of candy. In 1930 Dunham and two stockbrokers were found guilty of conspiracy in raising $2,000,000 for Page & Shaw stock, of which they kept half for themselves. That same year, the company went bankrupt and was bought by Daggett Co. in 1931, which in turn was bought by Necco in 1960. Page & Shaw chocolates were discontinued at about that time.

MIT's Wiesner Building now occupies Page & Shaw's former factory site on Ames Street.

== See also ==
- List of confectionery brands
