= Necco =

Candy manufacturer

- Type: Private company
- Industry: Confectionery
- Predecessor: Chase and Company, Ball and Fobes, Bird, Wright and Company
- Founded: April 26, 1847
- Defunct: July 19, 2018
- Fate: Operations halted
- Headquarters: Revere, Massachusetts
- Products: Necco Wafers, Sweethearts, Clark Bar and Haviland Thin Mints, among others
- Number of employees: 483 (as of March 2011)

Necco (or NECCO /ˈnɛkoʊ/ NEK-oh) was an American manufacturer of candy created in 1901 as the New England Confectionery Company through the merger of several small confectionery companies located in the Greater Boston area, with ancestral companies dating back to the 1840s.

In May 2018, Necco was sold for $17.33 million to Round Hill Investments LLC, run by billionaire C. Dean Metropoulos; Round Hill Investments then went into a bankruptcy auction, with Spangler Candy Company being the winning bidder.

The company was best known for its namesake candy, Necco Wafers (originally called "Hub Wafers") dating back to 1847. Other prominent products have included its seasonal Sweethearts Conversation Hearts, and brands such as the Clark Bar, Haviland Thin Mints and Sky Bar.

== History ==
=== Formation ===
Necco dated its origins to Chase and Company, a company founded by brothers Oliver R. and Silas Edwin Chase in 1847. Having previously invented and patented the first American candy machine, the Chase brothers continued to design and create machinery that made assortments of candies, such as their popular sugar wafers.

=== 1900s ===
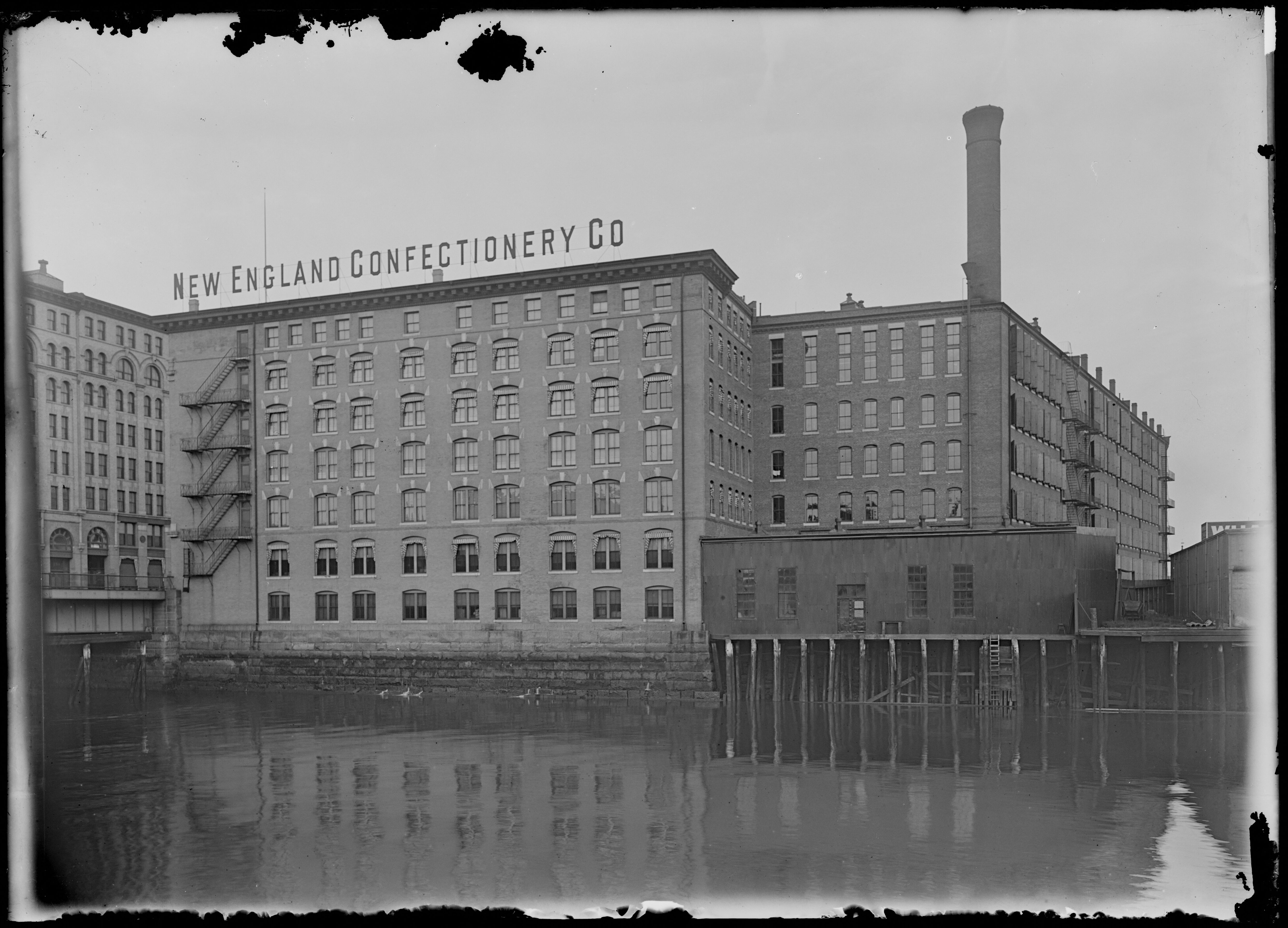
The Necco complex in South Boston which had a sign on the roof of the factory reading, "New England Confectionery Co.", as seen from across the Fort Point Channel, c. 1902–1907

Advertisement for Necco Wafers from the spring of 1916.

Two other confectionery companies, Ball and Fobes, founded by confectioner Daniel Fobes in 1848, and Bird, Wright and Company, a confectionery company based in Boston and founded in 1856, joined forces with Chase and Company in 1901 to become the three members of the original Necco family. The three confectionery firms then moved into a newly constructed manufacturing plant in the Fort Point–South Boston Waterfront area of Boston, Massachusetts, one year later and became the largest establishment devoted entirely to confectionery production in the United States.

The Boston Wharf Company developed the 1902 complex of four five-story buildings at 253 Summer Street and 11-37 Melcher Street. BWC named the adjacent streets Necco Court, Necco Street, and Necco Place. In 1907, 5 and 6 Necco Court were added behind the existing complex, connected by a four-story interior bridge. With nearby rail and water transportation, BWC specialized in shipment and storage of sugar and molasses. The Domino Sugar factory was also located nearby.

Success prompted the company, in 1906, to introduce a profit sharing plan. Necco continued its production while the confectionery industry continued to boom through the turn of the century. Around the same time, businessman David L. Clark began experimenting with his own candy creations in his home outside of Pittsburgh, Pennsylvania. He began selling the Clark candy bar for five cents and shipping his creation to soldiers fighting in World War I. At the same time, Charles Miller started a business manufacturing and selling homemade candy in the Boston area. Clark's creation and Miller's Mary Jane quickly become two of the most popular candy creations in the country.

In 1927, Necco moved into a new factory on Massachusetts Avenue in Cambridge, which was then the largest factory in the world devoted entirely to candy, as seen in a photograph of a 1928 Necco Wafers truck.

Necco continued its dominance of the candy-manufacturing business through much of the first half of the 20th century. In 1942, the U.S. Government requisitioned a "major portion of the production of the wafers, during World War II since the candy doesn't melt and is 'practically indestructible' during transit," This continued until 1945.

For several years, Necco was the first, and exclusive, licensed distributor of Rolo candy in the US. After losing the license to Hershey, for a time Necco marketed an identical product called "Milk Chocolate Caramel Roll".

Necco, still a family-run business in 1963 but having financial problems, was acquired by United Industrial Syndicate of New York. In 1978, after several reorganizations and seven company presidents, Domenic Antonellis was named its CEO, a role he would play for nearly 30 years.

During the second half of the 20th century Necco made several acquisitions of small candy companies, thereby expanding their product line. It acquired nearby Page & Shaw in 1960. Wisconsin's Stark Candy Company, which was founded in 1939, was acquired in 1988. The acquisition of Stark's Sweethearts, combined with Necco's existing Sweet Talk line of candies, made Necco the leading manufacturer of candy "conversation" hearts. In 1999, Pittsburgh-based Clark Bar America, Inc. was purchased, and by 2000 the company had 1200 employees.

=== 2000s ===
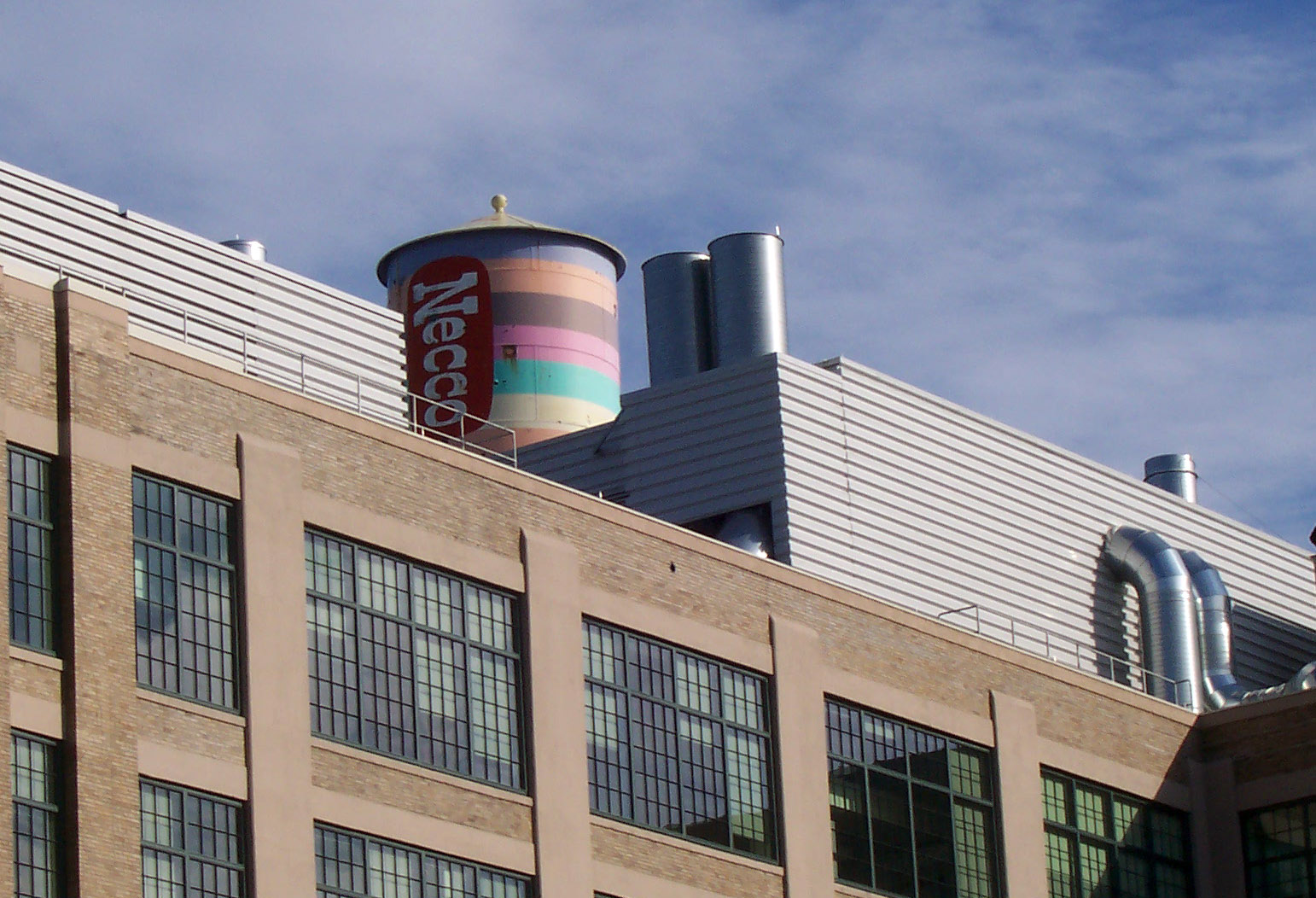
Former Necco factory on Mass. Ave. in Cambridge, Massachusetts, featuring a water tower painted to look like a roll of Necco Wafers.

In 2003, Necco consolidated its facilities to share a 52-acre (210,000 m^{2}), 810,000-square-foot (75,000 m^{2}) Revere, Massachusetts, plant and warehouse as its international headquarters. The site employed more than 700 workers.

Since April 2004, the Necco building at 250 Massachusetts Ave in Cambridge has been occupied by the Novartis Institutes for Biomedical Research. The water tower was repainted with a double helix to represent the biomedical research being performed within. In 2005, the structure, which is still referred to as the Necco candy factory, was added to the U.S. National Register of Historic Places.

By 2005, the company's annual revenue was around $100 million, at which level it was to remain for several years.

In December 2007, a buyout of Necco was orchestrated by the private equity fund American Capital Strategies (in partnership with Clear Creek Capital and Domenic Antonellis, the company's CEO). Necco announced the closure of its Pewaukee, Wisconsin, plant in March 2008. In August 2008, Necco replaced its CEO with Richard Krause, a former Procter & Gamble executive, who in February 2009 announced plans to "expand its brand now in the U.S. so it can expand globally later", aiming for a 30% growth in revenue by 2011.

In November 2010, Necco was listed for sale with a New York broker; although by February 2011, American Capital announced that the sale was off for the time being.

In July 2013, United Service Organizations sued Necco in U.S. District Court for continuing to use their trademarks after their 2009 marketing deal had expired. In February 2014, the case (1:13-cv-11754) was dismissed due to an out of court settlement.

=== Company tax breaks ===
The 2011 news that the company was no longer for sale was accompanied by reports that the company had supplied the city of Revere with five years' worth of overdue reports required as part of a tax increment financing (TIF) deal the company had received from the city; those reports "seemed to indicate that Necco has—for several years—not created the jobs they promised in the TIF agreement"; as of March 2011 Necco employed 483 people, including 30 Revere residents. The company's failure to meet the terms of its TIF agreement led the Massachusetts Economic Assistance Coordinating Council to decertify Necco's participation in the economic development program that administers the agreement. With the support of Revere's mayor, the city council voted to maintain the tax break, which saved the company $300,000, reducing their annual property taxes to $750,000. At one city hearing, Miles Arnone, a managing director of American Capital, had a heated exchange with city council member George Rotondo (who was running for mayor). Arnone was upset about being forced to talk about Necco's health "when you're down 30 percent"; the public exposure of the issue was raising concerns from large customers of Necco such as CVS Pharmacy and Target.

=== Sale and closure ===
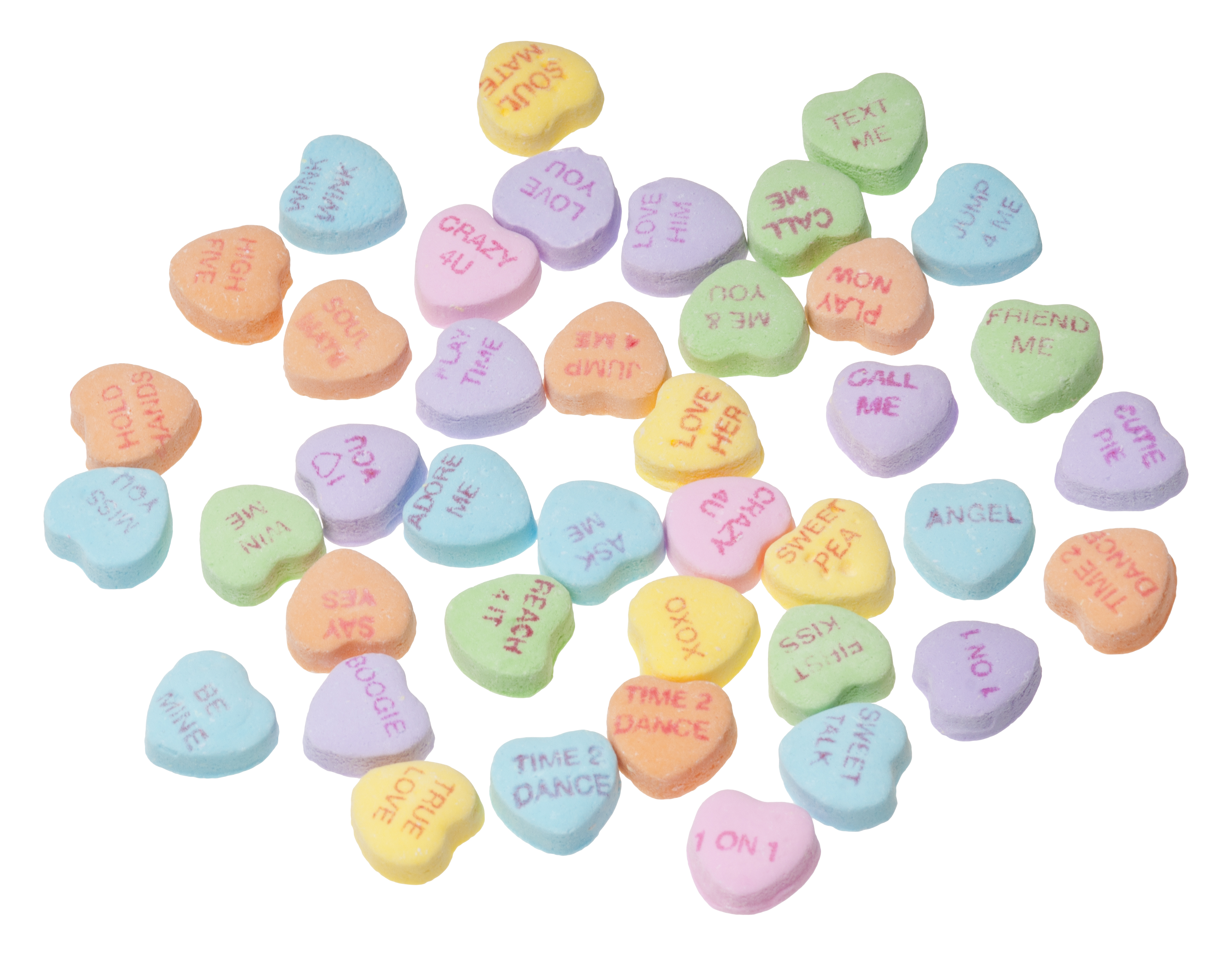
Necco's Sweethearts as of 2011

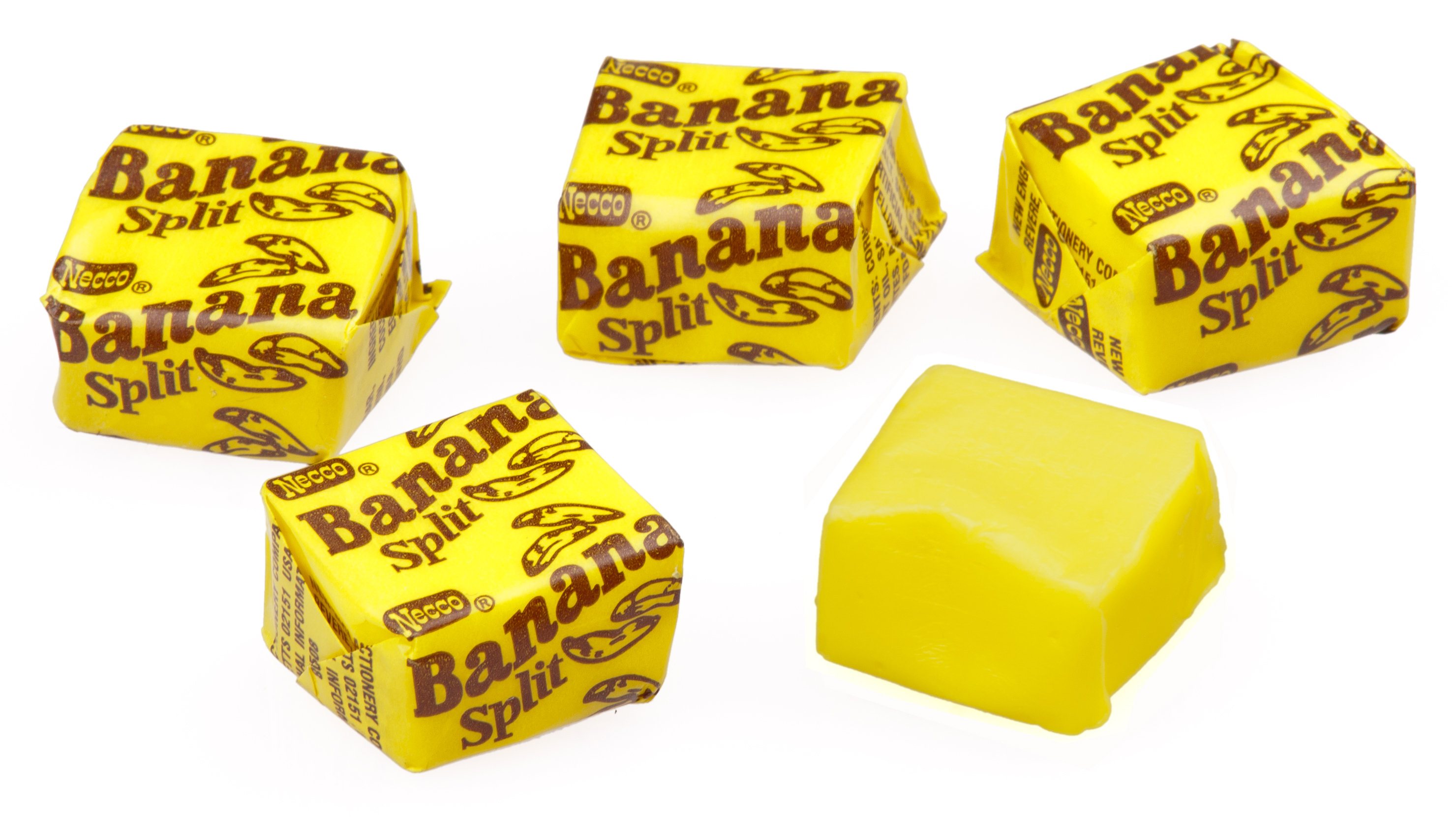
Banana Split chews

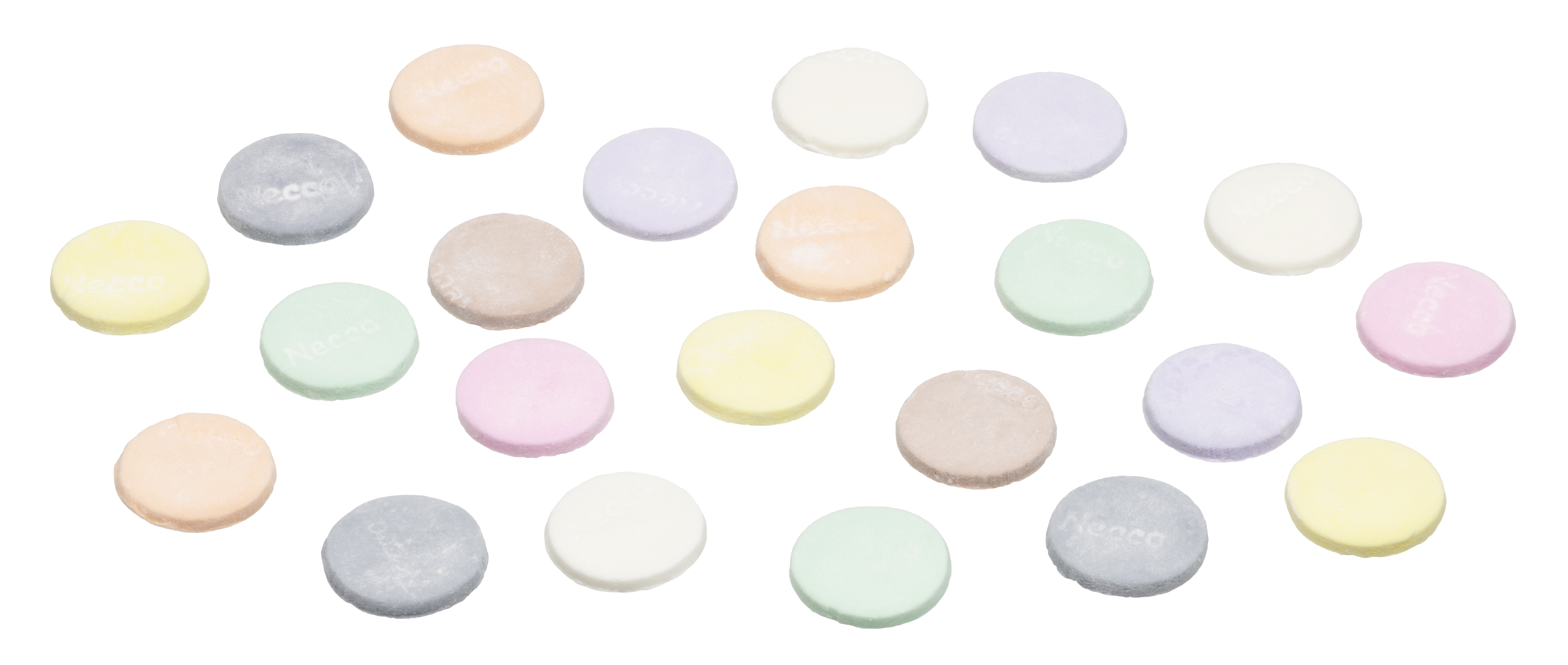
Necco Wafers

In May 2017, it was announced that the Revere complex containing the company headquarters and major manufacturing center had been sold for $54 million to Massachusetts real estate developers Atlantic Management and VMD Companies. The complex was leased to Necco until the end of August 2018.

In March 2018, chief executive Michael McGee announced that, unless a buyer for the company could be found, most of Necco's workforce could be laid off as early as May 6, 2018. With a workforce of approximately 500, Necco was the largest employer in Revere at the time. Online sales of Necco Wafers and other products subsequently spiked, with buyers concerned that the candy would be discontinued, some even offering to sell a car for Necco Wafers.

On May 16, 2018, the U.S. Food and Drug Administration (FDA) found serious violations of the current Good Manufacturing Practice, Hazard Analysis, and Risk-Based Preventive Controls for Human Food regulation. The violations included significant evidence of rodent activity and insanitary conditions throughout the facility. This was the fifth citation for rodent infestation.

The assets of Necco were sold in a bankruptcy auction in May, 2018, with Spangler Candy Company having the winning bid of $18.83 million. However, Spangler backed out of the transaction and the company was instead sold for $17.33 million to Round Hill Investments, owned by billionaire C. Dean Metropoulos. They briefly operated the candy manufacturer under the name of Sweethearts, LLC.

Two months later, in July, Round Hill Investments announced the immediate closure of Necco's Revere facility following the sale of Necco to an unnamed candy manufacturer, citing "sanitation issues" it claimed it was previously unaware of. About 230 workers were laid off when the Revere plant closed. At the time, Necco was the oldest candy company in the United States. In July 2018, Necco workers were reportedly in high demand by other companies.

The purchaser was subsequently identified as the Spangler Candy Company, who had backed out of the purchase months earlier. They planned to restart manufacture of Necco wafers, Sweethearts and Canada Mints, but other Necco-owned brands would not be retained. The Clark Bar was sold in early September to Boyer Candy Company, while other brands and equipment were disbursed at auction at the end of September. Candy buttons were bought by Doscher's Candies, and Banana Split and Mint Julep chews along with Slap Stix lollipops went to the Reading, Pennsylvania-based Mega Candy Co. Haviland Thin Mints and Mighty Malt Milk Balls were sold to Minnesota-based Log House Food. Equipment and foodstock were disbursed internationally. Some unclaimed brands, such as Sky Bar, were later sold in online auctions, while Mary Jane candies, unsold at auction, were licensed by Spangler to Atkinson Candy Company of Lufkin, Texas.

In October 2019, it was announced that the Revere complex would be leased to Amazon for use as a distribution center.

== Brands ==
- Banana Split chews
- Canada Mints
- Candy Cupboard & Masterpieces
- Candy House Candy Buttons
- Clark Bar candy bars
- Kettle Fresh
- Mary Janes and Mary Jane peanut butter kisses
- Mint Julep chews
- Mighty Malts Malted Milk Balls
- Necco Wafers
- Peach Blossoms
- Sky Bar candy bars
- Slap Stix
- Squirrel Nut Caramels
- Squirrel Nut Zippers
- Stark Candy Raisins
- Sweethearts Conversation Hearts

The Haviland division of Necco produced many candies such as Haviland Thin Mints, Bridge Mix, and others.
