= Stark Candy Company =

Former Candy manufacturer

- Company type: Private company
- Industry: Confectionery
- Founded: 1939
- Founder: Howard B. Stark
- Defunct: 2008
- Fate: Purchased, then closed
- Successor: Necco
- Headquarters: Pewaukee, Wisconsin, U.S.
- Products: Stark wafers, candy hearts

The Stark Candy Company, originally the Howard B. Stark Company, was a candy manufacturer founded in 1939, in Milwaukee, Wisconsin. It was a competitor to Necco and manufactured products including candy hearts, candy raisins, Mary Janes, peanut butter kisses, salt water taffy, and candy cigarettes.

Stark moved from Milwaukee to Pewaukee in 1960. In 1988, it was purchased by Necco. In 2008, Necco announced the Stark plant would close. Candy raisins were discontinued after the company was purchased by Necco, sparking a consumer backlash.
