= Mary Jane (candy) =

Candy

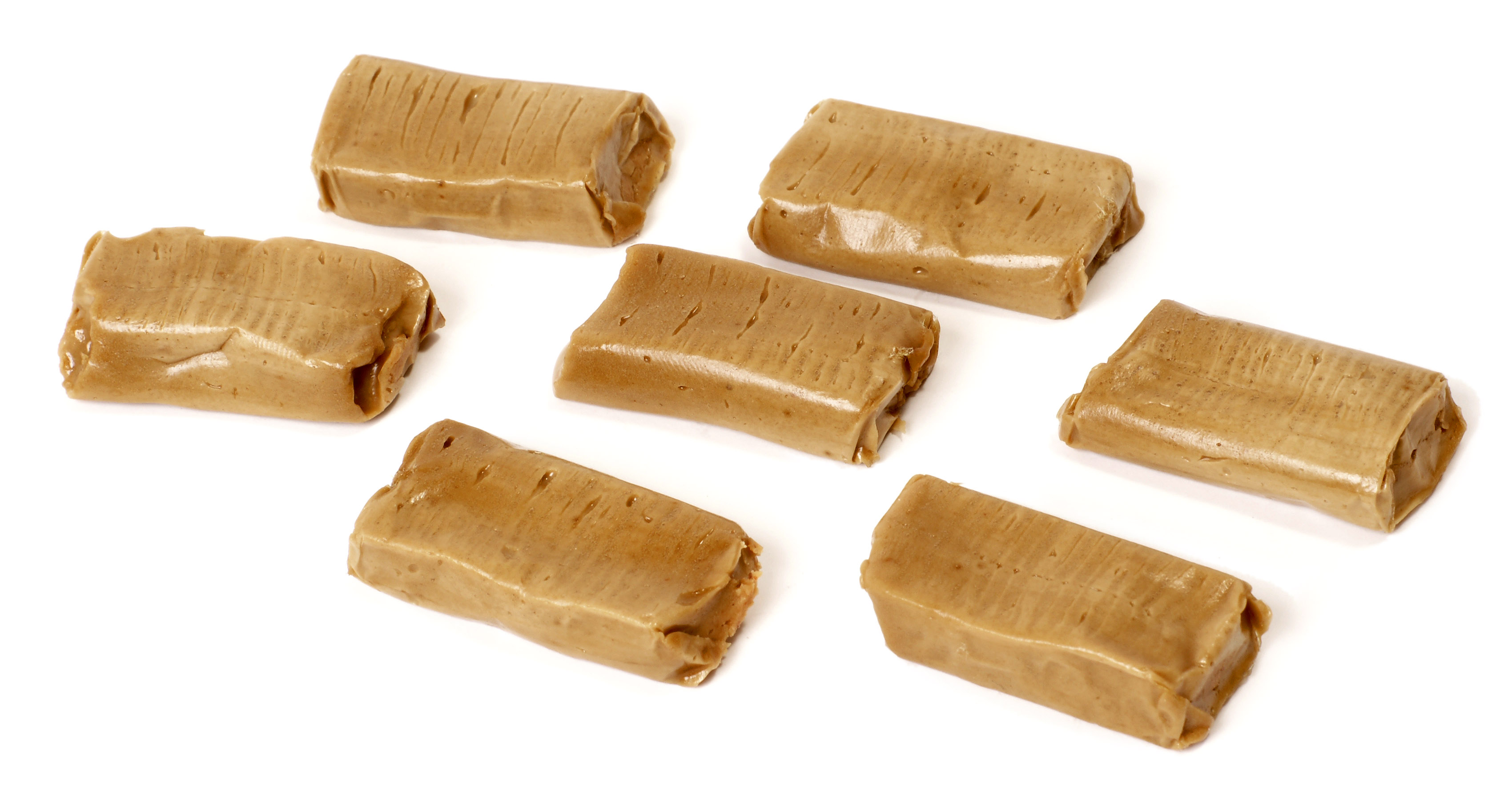
- Mary Jane candies
- Product type: Candy
- Current owner: Atkinson Candy Company
- Country: United States
- Introduced: 1914; 112 years ago
- Markets: North America
- Previous owners: Robert O. Lord; Charles N. Miller Company; Stark Candy Company; Necco

Mary Jane is an old-fashioned taffy-type candy made from peanut butter and molasses. First marketed in 1914, Mary Jane has remained in production for over a century, save for a two-year pause when its ownership changed hands.

== History ==
In the 1800s, molasses was a popular confectionery ingredient for making taffy, with many candy companies situated in and around Boston, Massachusetts, then a major port in the molasses trade. These included the New England Confectionery Company (better known as Necco) in Cambridge, the Austin T. Merrill Company in Roxbury, and Charles H. Miller and Sons who began operating out of the former North End residence of Paul Revere starting in 1884. In 1914, Charles H. Miller's son, Charles N. Miller, developed the formula for a taffy-like candy that mixed peanut butter into the molasses for a softer texture than earlier candies. Miller chose to call his candy "Mary Jane," citing that it was the name of his favorite aunt while also choosing a cartoon mascot who resembled a character of the same name that appeared in the popular Buster Brown comic strip at that time. Mary Janes were wrapped in yellow wax paper brandished with a single red stripe and originally sold as penny candies under the slogan, “Use your change for Mary Janes.” The Mary Jane logo—a cartoon girl clad in a yellow dress and bonnet with the candy's name emblazoned across the hem—has remained intact since the product's inception.

In 1989, the Wisconsin-based Stark Candy Company acquired Miller's holdings and began producing Mary Janes until Stark was bought out by Necco in 2008, effectively returning the candy's production to Massachusetts. When Necco filed for bankruptcy in 2018, the company's various brands were auctioned off a la carte and no buyer was immediately found for Mary Janes. Necco's purchaser, Spangler Candy Company, thus retained rights to the Mary Jane brand but had no plans to make the candy. In 2019, the Atkinson Candy Company entered a licensing agreement with Spangler and renewed production of Mary Janes starting in 2020.

== In popular culture ==
Mary Jane candies, and their cartoon mascot, are featured in Toni Morrison’s 1970 novel, The Bluest Eye. The historical reference to the candies is made when Pecola Breedlove walks to the penny store with her heart set on Mary Janes. She imagines the sweetness of the caramel and peanut butter taffy candy, knowing that her three pennies will get her three Mary Janes. As the entire novel works to address complex themes like internalized hatred and family inheritance, the Mary Janes further build on the ideal of white beauty standards. Little Mary Jane is pictured in her dress and bonnet, with her blonde hair, white face, and blue eyes staring back. To Pecola, the blue eyes symbolize beauty—something she seemingly does not possess but yearns for.
