= Sweethearts (candy) =

Heart shaped candies with printed messages

Sweethearts box

Sweethearts (also known as conversation hearts) are small heart-shaped sugar candies sold around Valentine's Day. Each heart is printed with a message such as "Be Mine", "Kiss Me", "Call Me", "Let's Get Busy", "Miss You", or "I'm Yours". Sweethearts were made by the New England Confectionery Company, or Necco, before being purchased by the Spangler Candy Company in 2018. They were also previously made by the Stark Candy Company. Necco manufactured nearly 8 billion Sweethearts per year. Similar products are available from Brach's and other companies. A similar type of candy is sold in the UK under the name Love Hearts; while similar in formulation to Sweethearts, Love Hearts are round, with the heart design and message embossed on their surface.

== History ==
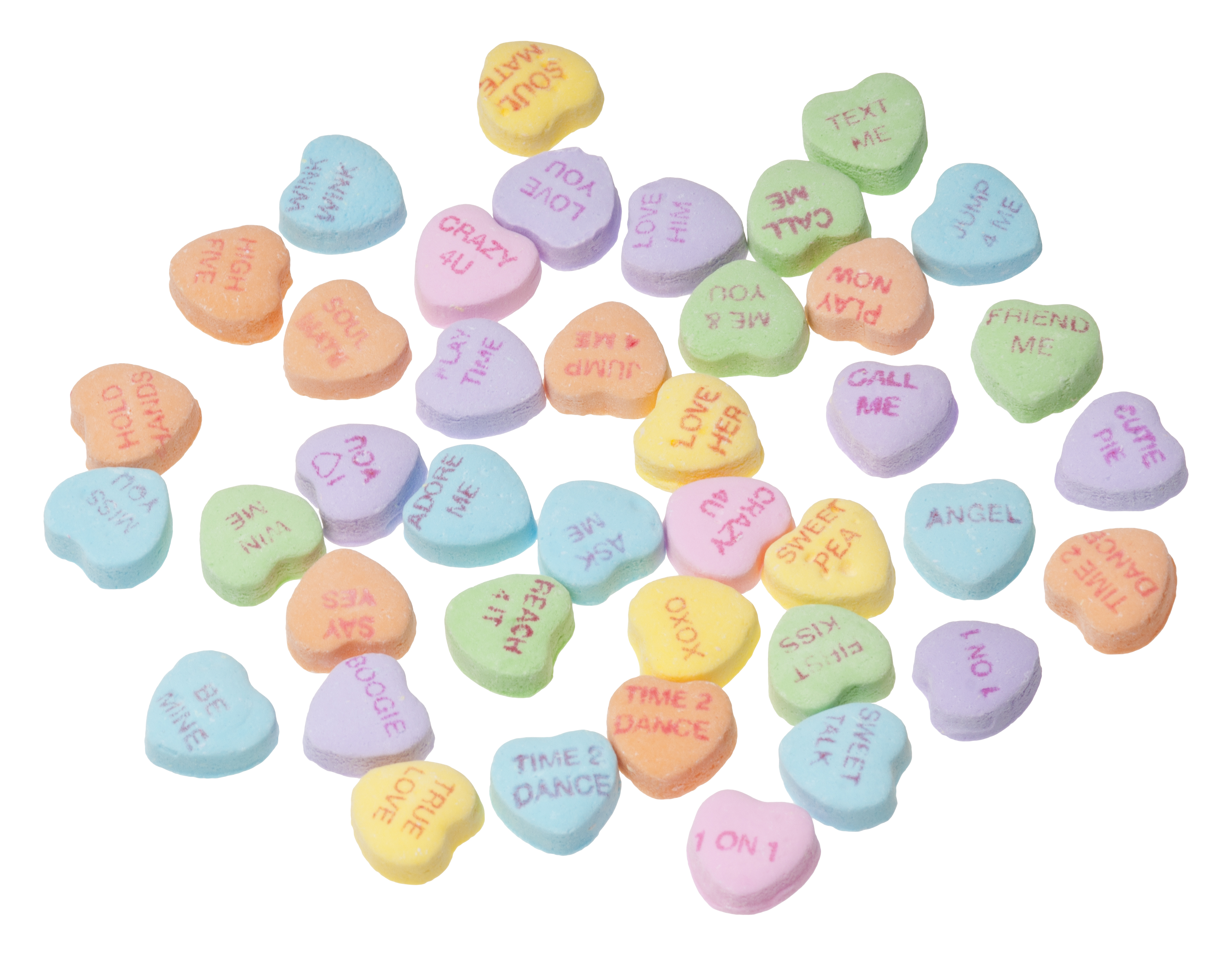
Necco Sweethearts

Oliver R. Chase invented a machine in 1847 to cut lozenges from wafer candy, similar to Necco Wafers, and started a candy factory.

Daniel Chase, Oliver's brother, began printing sayings on the candy in 1866. He designed a machine that was able to press on the candy similar to a stamp. The candy was often used for weddings since the candies had witty saying such as: "Married in pink, he will take a drink", "Married in White, you have chosen right", and "Married in Satin, Love will not be lasting".

The candies were originally in the shape of a seashell and were large enough to carry a longer message. The heart-shaped conversation candies to be called Sweethearts got their start in 1901. Other shapes formerly produced include lozenges, horseshoes, and baseballs. Line extensions carrying the Sweethearts brand include chocolates and sugar-free hearts.

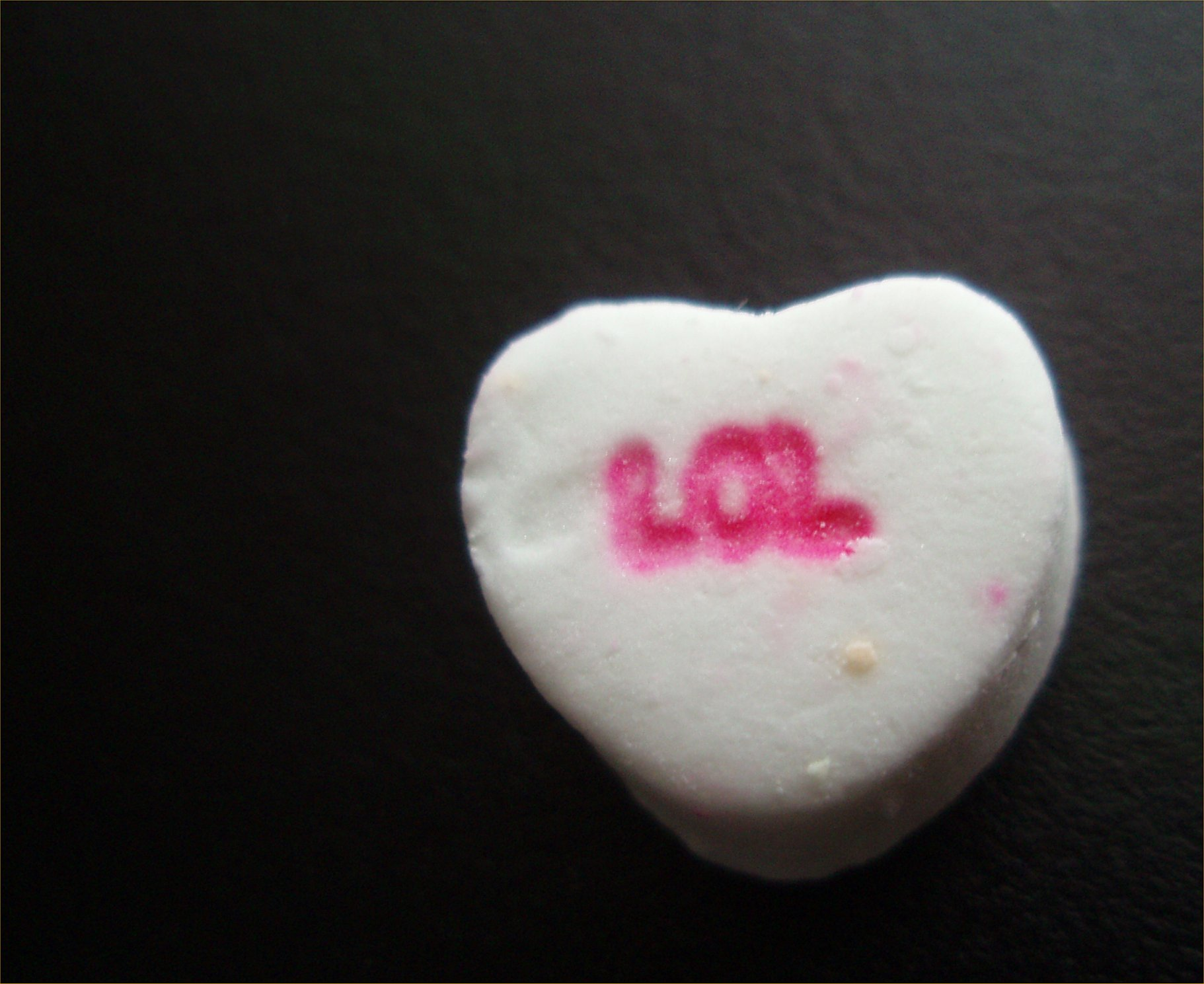
A Sweetheart with the phrase "LOL", a relatively new phrase

In the 1990s, Necco vice-president Walter Marshall wanted to update some of the sayings and retire others. For example, the outdated "Fax Me" was retired, and the more modern "Text Me" was added. The romantic expressions continue to be revised for young Americans. Necco received hundreds of suggestions a year on new sayings. The most sought-after motto is "Marry Me".

Necco produced the hearts year-round, but mixing of colors and packaging were ramped up beginning in September to meet the demand for the product at Valentine's Day. Approximately 100,000 pounds (45,000 kg) of hearts were made per day, which sells out in about six weeks. The company produces 8 billion hearts per year. As a Valentine candy, it is second in popularity only to chocolate. The largest market is related to school celebrations on Valentine's Day.

=== Flavor change ===
In 2010, the classic pastel candy formula was abandoned. Sweethearts were made softer with vivid colors and new flavors. These new flavors included sour apple and blue raspberry. The changes to the flavors and messages were unpopular with some fans.

=== Bankruptcy and return ===
In 2018, Necco declared bankruptcy. The original plant closed and their candy brands were sold off. The rights to Sweethearts were acquired by Spangler Candy Company. With the purchase of the brand by Spangler, Sweethearts were unavailable for Valentine's Day 2019 as Spangler set up production of the confections in a new plant. Sweethearts returned in 2020 with the original flavors from before Necco's 2010 change, but due to equipment problems, the familiar sayings were largely either incomplete or missing entirely.

== Ingredients ==
The main ingredients are corn syrup, sugar, gelatin, and various types of food coloring.

== See also ==
- Broken heart
- Fortune cookie
- Love Hearts – British candy version of Sweethearts
- List of confectionery brands
