= Chick-O-Stick =

Peanut butter confectionery

Pre-2019 Chick-O-Stick packaging

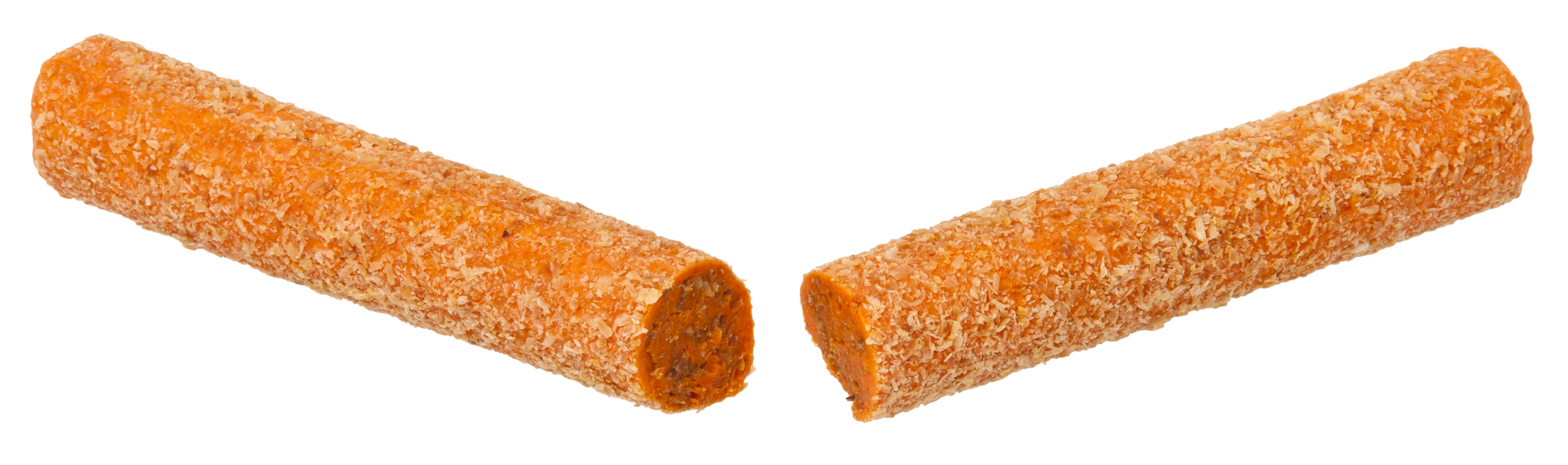
A pre-2019 Chick-O-Stick showing texture and the former bright-orange color

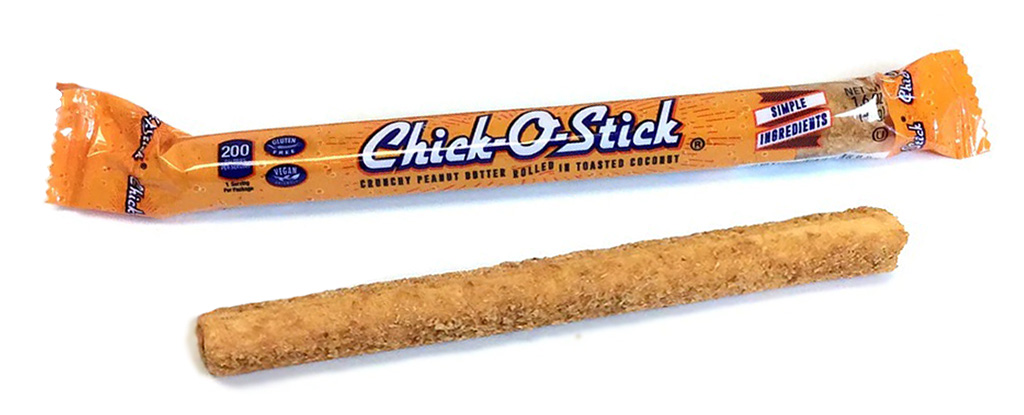
Current (2022) Chick-O-Stick packaging and post-2019 "natural" color

Chick-O-Stick is a candy produced by the Atkinson Candy Company that has been manufactured since the 1950s. It is made primarily from peanut butter, cane sugar, corn syrup, toasted coconut, natural vanilla flavor, and salt with no hydrogenated oils or artificial preservatives added. There is also a sugar-free version of the candy which uses Splenda as a sweetener.

Chick-O-Stick is currently produced as a naturally-colored stick of varying length and thickness, dusted with ground coconut. The interior of the stick is honeycombed with peanut butter and a hardened syrup/sugar mixture that also forms the shell. When eaten fresh, the candy is dry and brittle, but it has a tendency to absorb moisture and become hard and chewy if left in the open air for an extended period.

Formerly the color of Chick-O-Stick candy was a rather bright-orange color produced by artificial red and blue coloring ingredients, however, in 2019, Atkinson announced that the Chick-O-Stick recipe would be simplified to utilize vegetable juice and turmeric root for the new, natural light-brown color of the candy, and to replace artificial preservatives and hydrogenated oils with healthier alternatives.

Chick-O-Stick is available in 0.35-ounce (9.9 g), 0.70-ounce (20 g), 1.0-ounce (28 g), and 1.6-ounce (45 g) sizes, as well as bags of individually wrapped bite-sized pieces. The size of the largest variant has been reduced by 20% since 2022, when it was 2.0-ounce (57 g), according to the history of this document.

Chick-O-Sticks are Kosher, gluten-free, and "vegan friendly" and are one of the few full-size products that Atkinson Candy Company makes. Most other products made by this company come only in individually-wrapped bite size or Halloween size portions.

== Packaging and name ==
Chick-O-Stick's original wrapper design featured a stylized cartoon of a chicken wearing a cowboy hat and a badge in the shape of the Atkinson logo. The chicken is absent from the more recent wrapper; some commentators have indicated that it contributed to confusion over whether the Chick-O-Stick was candy or a chicken-flavored cracker. The Atkinson Candy Company's website states that one of their sales representatives just "came up with the name one day, and well, it just stuck." The company had once written in correspondence that they felt the Chick-O-Stick resembled "fried chicken" and that contributed to the name.
