= The Warrell Corporation =

American food company

The Warrell Corporation is a confectionery and snack food manufacturing company based in Camp Hill, Pennsylvania.

== History ==
The company was established in 1965 by Lincoln Warrell, originally named Pennsylvania Dutch Candies.

In 2000, Pennsylvania Dutch Candies, Katherine Beecher Candies, and Melster Candies were brought together under the new Warrell Corporation name and the company opened a new 200,000 sq ft manufacturing facility. Melster was originally acquired in 1982, but was sold in 2004 to Colorado-based Impact Confections.

With more than 300 employees, the company's main manufacturing facilities are located at the township of Lower Allen, Cumberland County. In 2019, Warrell Corporation launched Warrell Creations. A significant portion of the company's business involves contract manufacturing for other confectioners, specifically high-quantity chocolate. Warrell Creations is also capable of fire roasting and creating nut clusters. In addition to contract manufacturing, the company focuses on maintaining non-seasonal products to ensure year-round financial stability.

Patricia Zwergel is the company's Chairman and CEO. In 2001, the company's previous CEO, Lincoln Warrell, was inducted into the National Confectionery Sales Association's Candy Hall of Fame. He was previously a Director and vice-president of the National Confectioners Association. In 2005, he was awarded Candy Industry Magazine's Kettle Award. Pennsylvania Dutch Candies remained a Warrell Corporation brand until its acquisition by Nassau Candy in 2020.

== Previous Warrell Corporation brands ==
Pennsylvania Dutch Candies was a Warrell Corporation brand until 2020. They make candies such as Sanded Candy Drops, chocolate-covered pretzels, stick candy, nuts, dried fruits, and peanut brittle.

In 2010, the company began contract-manufacturing Bonomo's Turkish Taffy. The company was the only manufacturer with equipment capable of making the certified-kosher confectionery.

In 2009, the company acquired the Classic Caramel Co., which had been based in Pennsylvania until its closure in 2008. The company was restarted and renamed the Warrell Classic Co. and continues to make the 30 different types of caramel original distributed under the Classic Caramel brand. The company closed in 2019.

In early 2013, the company announced that it had sold three of its brands to the Texas-based Atkinson Candy Company. Warrell is no longer manufacturing Slo Poke, Black Cow and Sophie Mae candies in Pennsylvania.

== Warrell Creations' Capabilities ==
Warrell Creations has remained focused on bringing new products to life for confectioners. Warrell Creations has a product development team that works closely with R&D departments to source the necessary ingredients strategically. Original product samples are created using a structured stage-gate process. Warrell Creations has a full breadth of snack and confectionery capabilities, including artisanal chocolate panning, chocolate enrobing, and fire roasting. Warrell also has the ability to co-manufacture nut cluster squares, brittle and toffee candy, as well as snack bites. Warrell Creations has packing machines that utilize roll stock.

== Politics ==
In 2013, Warrell Corp. representatives announced the company would be supporting Pennsylvania Senator Pat Toomey's bill to "end sugar market controls and subsidies". Representatives of The Hershey Company have announced they would also be supporting the legislation.
