= Sky Bar =

American candy bar

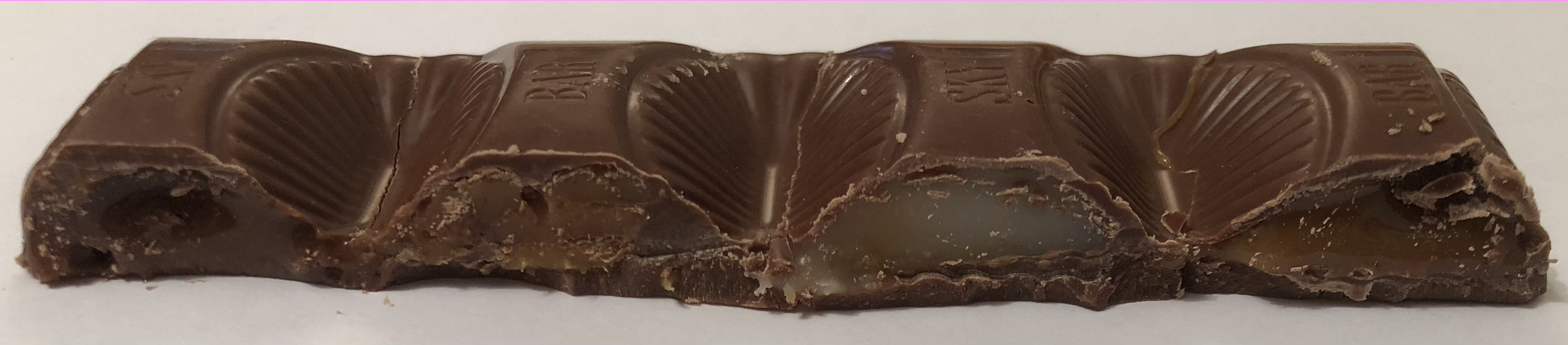
- Product type: Candy bar
- Current owner: Sky Bar Confectionery Company
- Country: United States
- Introduced: 1938; 2019 (reintroduced)
- Discontinued: 2018
- Markets: New England
- Previous owners: Necco
- Website: skybarcandy.com

Sky Bar is an American candy bar introduced by Necco in 1938, discontinued in 2018 upon Necco's bankruptcy, and reintroduced in 2019 by the Sky Bar Confectionery Company. Each Sky Bar has four sections, each with a different filling—caramel, vanilla, peanut, and fudge—all covered in milk chocolate.

== History ==
=== New England Confectionery Company ===
Sky Bar advertisement published in the Pittsburgh Sun-Telegraph in September 1938

Sky Bar was first announced in March 1938, as the New England Confectionery Company (Necco) became the first manufacturer in the United States to introduce a molded candy bar with four different centers encased in a chocolate covering. The originator of the Sky Bar was a candy maker working for Necco named Joseph Cangemi. It was similar to a larger candy bar made by Trudeau Candy in Saint Paul, Minnesota, called Seven Up and with seven different fillings.

Necco introduced Sky Bar by means of a dramatic skywriting advertising campaign, and ran a "complete the sentence" contest in The Boston Globe with cash prizes to raise consumer awareness. The initial price for a Sky Bar was five cents.

Sky Bar's four different centers enrobed in chocolate were originally described in 1938 as English toffee, nougat, nut butter toffee, and fudge parfait. By 1955, they were English toffee, honey nougat, peanut whip, and fudge parfait. By 2001, the fillings were caramel, vanilla, peanut, and fudge. The peanut section was not peanut butter—it was a peanut-flavored caramel—while the vanilla section was not quite nougat or marshmallow, but similar to the consistency of a Valomilk cup.

In 1945, a Necco advertisement for Sky Bar was one of only six signs illuminated in New York City's Times Square following VE Day.

In late 2009, as an advertising tie-in with the DVD release of New Moon (from the Twilight vampire series), Necco released special chocolate bars inspired by the original Sky Bar candy. One bar, similar to the original, contained three filling flavors—caramel, creme and peanut butter. Another bar resembled a heart shape and only contained creme.

By 2014, Sky Bar had become difficult to find, but was still produced by Necco and could be found in some stores such as Cracker Barrel (especially in New England) or on the Internet through Amazon.com (in bulk) or some candy resellers.

=== Sky Bar Confectionery Company ===
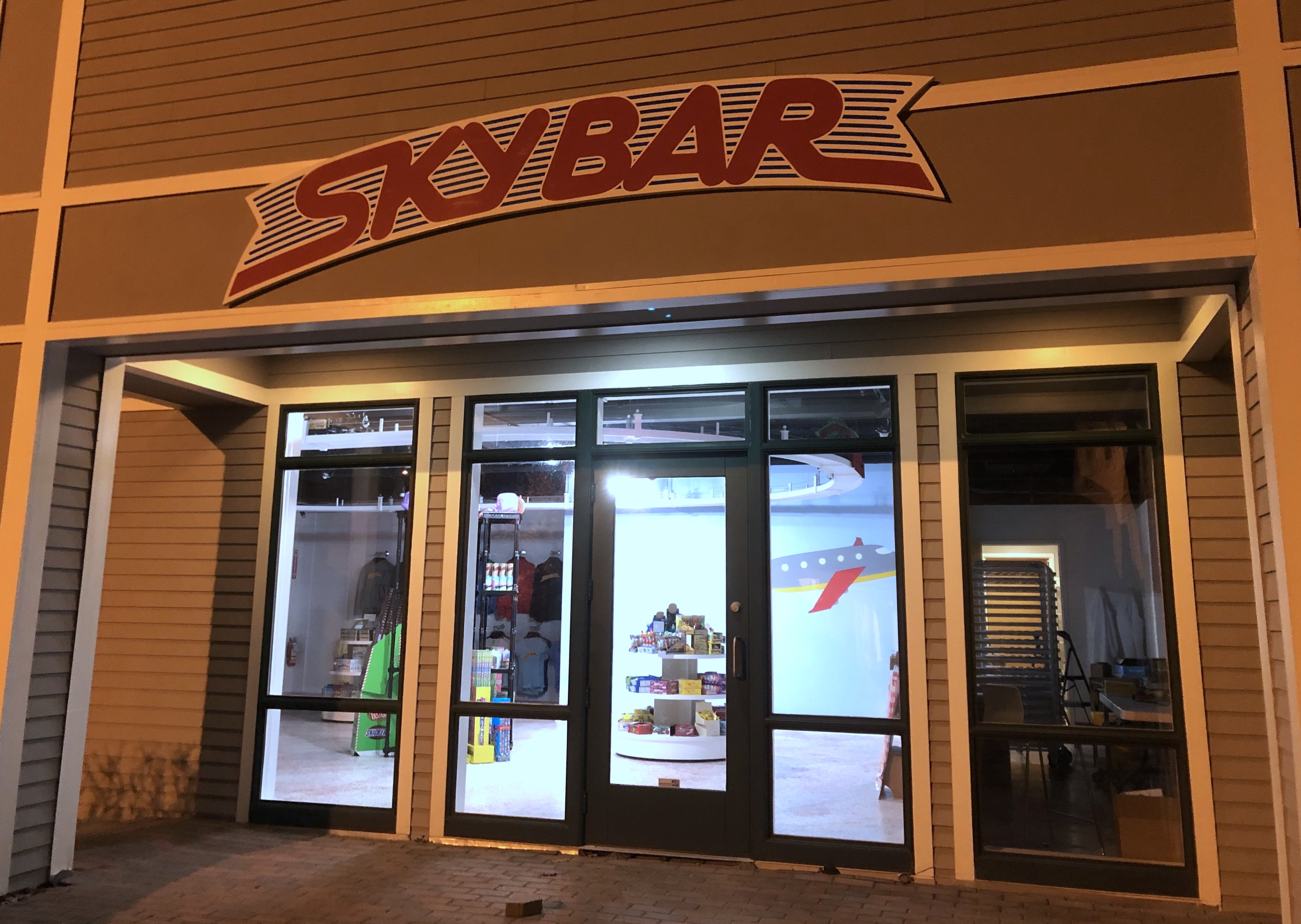
Storefront of the Sky Bar Confectionery Company in Sudbury, Massachusetts

Following the closure of Necco in mid-2018, the Sky Bar brand and recipe was sold at auction on September 27, 2018. The winning bidder was Louise Mawhinney, owner of a gourmet food store named Duck Soup based in Sudbury, Massachusetts. In November 2019, operating as the Sky Bar Confectionery Company, ownership announced that Sky Bar was once again in production, available online and at the Duck Soup store in Sudbury. Beginning December 7th, 2019, the Sky Bar was sold at a separate Sky Bar store directly adjacent to Duck Soup, with the bar being produced in the rear of the store.

== In popular culture ==
A Sky Bar candy bar is shown twice in the 2009 film The House of the Devil. Early in the film, the protagonist, Samantha Hughes (Jocelin Donahue) opens and begins to consume a Sky Bar while in her college dorm room. Later, during her babysitting job, she's shown eating an already opened Sky Bar (presumably the unfinished candy bar from earlier).

In Dimension 20: The Unsleeping City, Sky Bars are a key plot point. Sofia Lee, played by Emily Axford, buys two Sky Bars, afterwards smooshing one into the ground as a sacrifice to her dead husband and eating three segments of the other offering the last one to her mentor.

Sky Bar has been featured on the Shudder original program The Last Drive-in with Joe Bob Briggs. The show sometimes invites a person dressed in a Sky Bar costume to participate in the show.

== Gallery ==
Necco bar in wrapper

Sky Bar Confectionary Company bar in wrapper

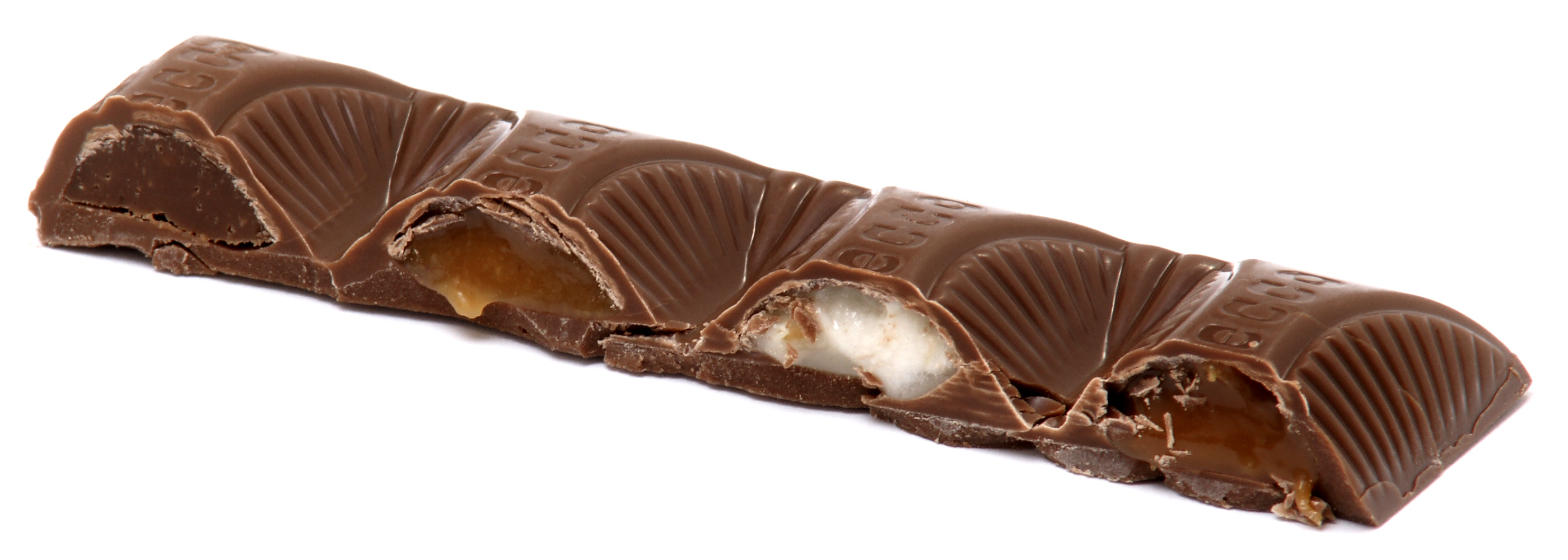
Necco bar unwrapped and split

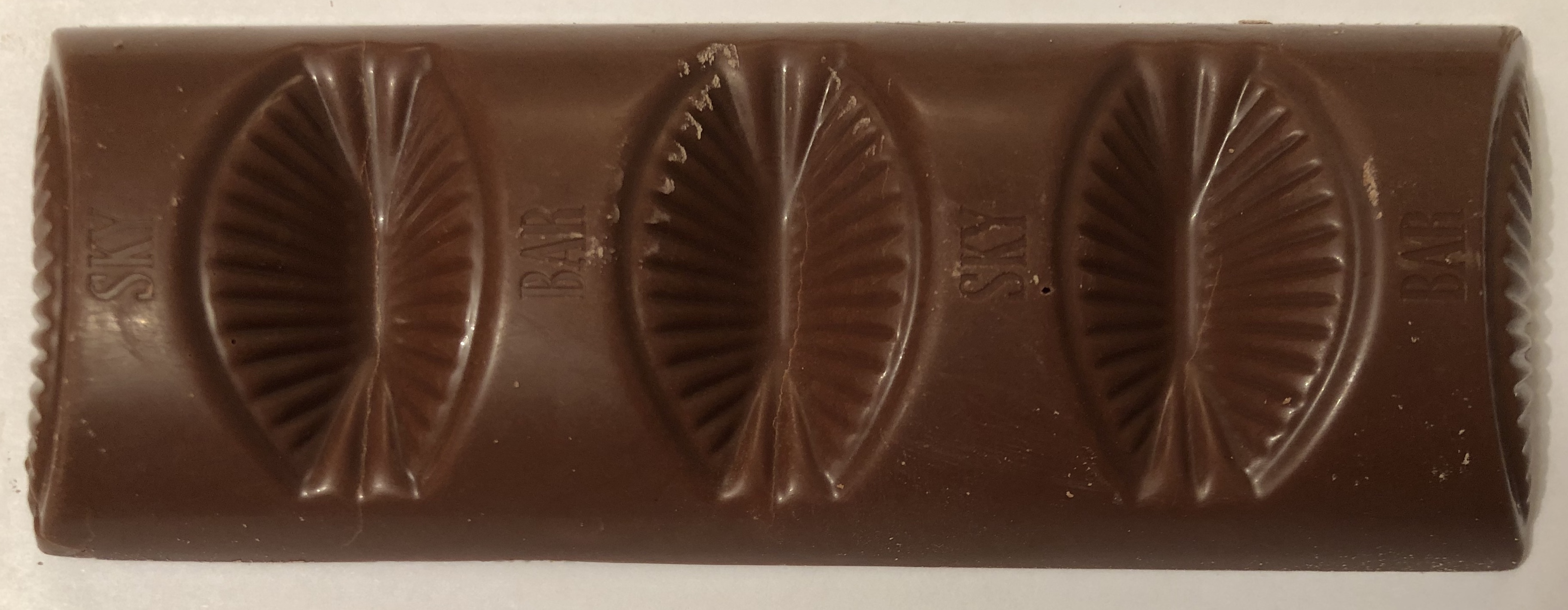
Sky Bar Confectionary Company bar unwrapped
