= New England Confectionery Company Factory =

- U.S. National Register of Historic Places
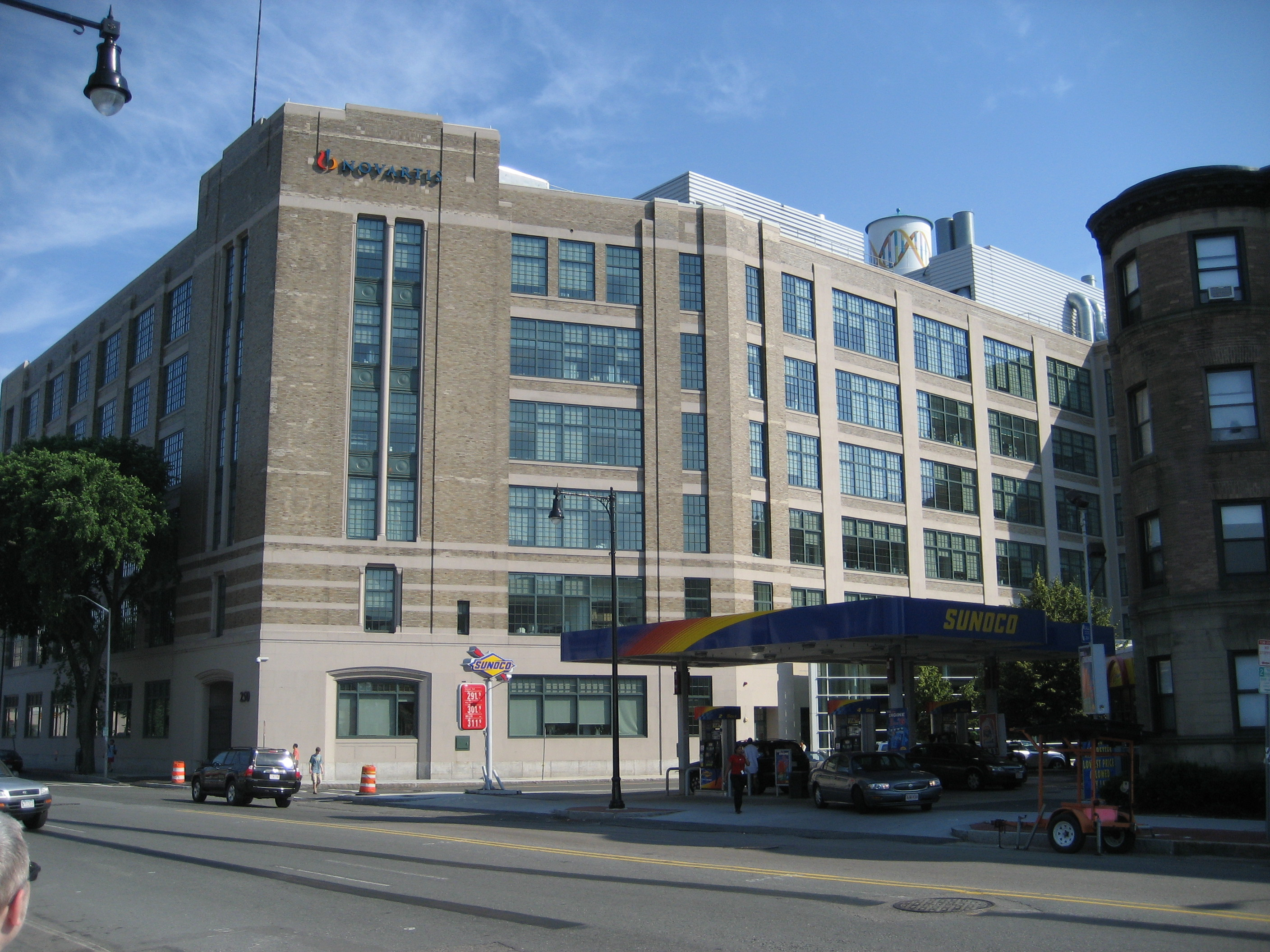
- New England Confectionery Company Factory

- Location within Massachusetts Location within the United States
- Location: Cambridge, Massachusetts
- Coordinates: 42°21′40″N 71°05′52″W
- Area: 3.3 acres (1.3 ha)
- Architect: Lockwood, Greene & Co.; Hegeman Harris Co., Inc.
- Architectural style: Moderne
- NRHP reference No.: 05001209
- Added to NRHP: November 9, 2005

The New England Confectionery Company Factory, also known as the NECCO Candy Factory, is a historic factory complex at 250 Massachusetts Avenue in Cambridge, Massachusetts. The property is now owned by DFS Advisors, and is under long-term lease to Novartis. The complex, which includes the factory building, a power plant, and a modern (2003) parking garage, occupies most of an entire city block bounded by Massachusetts Avenue, Cross Street, Albany Street, and Lansdowne Street. The Moderne-style building was constructed of reinforced concrete, faced predominantly with beige brick and trimmed with limestone. On some facades smooth concrete predominates as the finish surface. The building had a water tower that was painted to resemble a roll of Necco Wafers; during the alterations of the property for use by Novartis, the water tower was retained, and is now painted with a DNA pattern in pastel colors. The building was listed on the National Register of Historic Places in 2005.

== Company history ==
The New England Confectionery Company was formed in 1901 by the merger of three Boston-area confectioners. One of these, Ball and Fobes, had in 1860 acquired another competitor whose equipment included precursors to those used to manufacture Necco Wafers. Ball and Fobes developed methods to print writing on hard candies. It was built in 1925-27 to serve as the company's sole manufacturing facility, replacing earlier facilities (which are now part of the Fort Point Channel Historic District) in Boston, and was at the time the world's largest candy factory. The building was designed in the Moderne style by a company engineer, F. C. Lutze, and built by Lockwood & Greene. The company used the facility as its major production facility until 2003, when it consolidated operations in Revere.

== Gallery ==
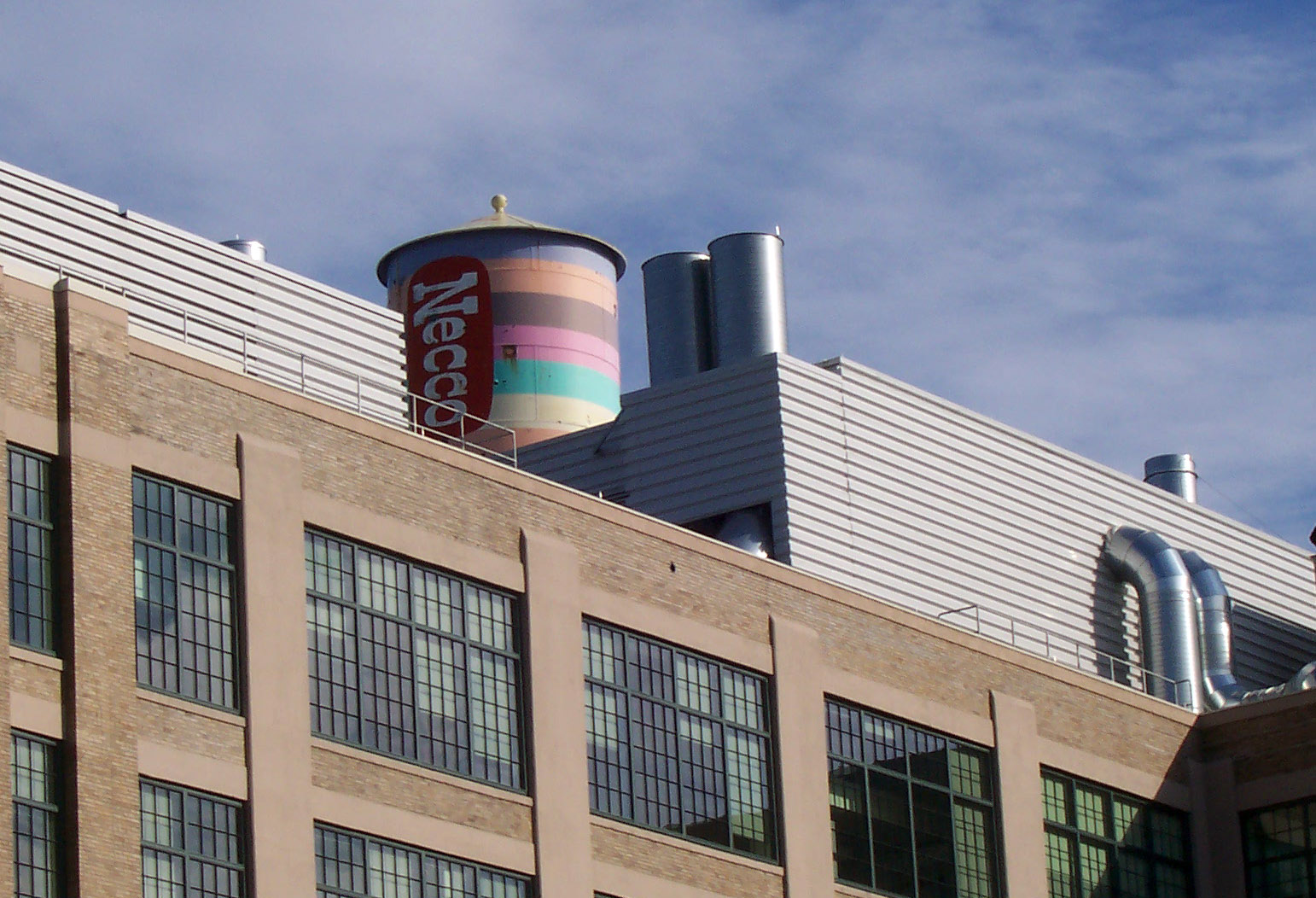
Necco Factory, 2004, featuring water tower that had been painted (in 1996) to resemble a roll of Necco Wafers candy. Picture taken shortly before tower was repainted to Novartis design

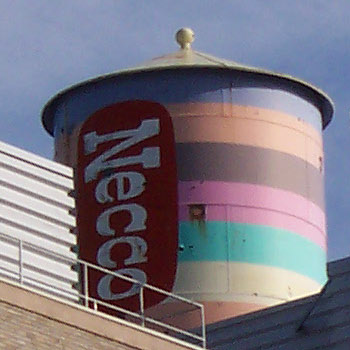
Detail of water tower

== See also ==
- National Register of Historic Places listings in Cambridge, Massachusetts
