= Haviland Thin Mints =

Chocolate-covered mint candy

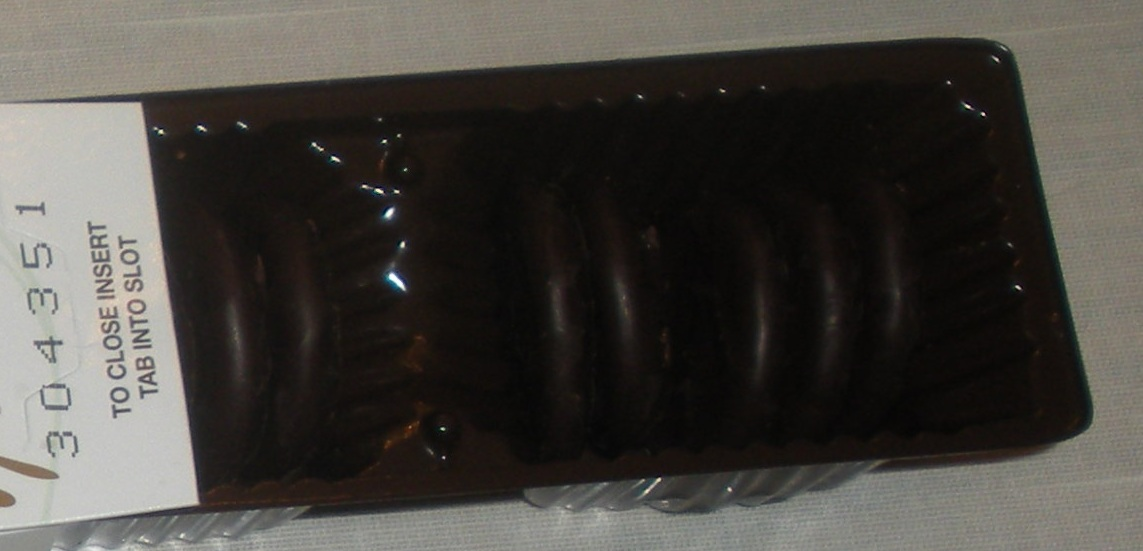
- Product type: Confectionery
- Current owner: Log House Foods (since 2018)
- Country: United States
- Previous owners: Miller and Hollis Corp. 1961–1970: Deran Confectionery; 1970–1993 Borden Inc. 1993–1994: Great American Brands; 1994–2018: Necco

Haviland Thin Mints are a chocolate-covered mint candy produced by Log House Foods of Plymouth, Minnesota. The candy is a mint fondant covered in dark chocolate, similar to the York Peppermint Pattie but smaller, thinner and shorter.

The brand dates its origins to at least World War II, when it was one of the candies supplied to U.S. soldiers (made by Miller and Hollis). Haviland Thin Mints and related brands were acquired in 1961 by Deran which was in turn itself acquired in 1970 by Borden which manufactured them for over twenty years. Under Deran and Borden the Mints were sold by youth to raise funds to attend YMCA summer camp.

Haviland Thin Mints were briefly owned by Great American Brands (GAB), an investment group, who filed for bankruptcy in 1994, and in September of that year, the brand was acquired by Revere, Massachusetts-based Necco. In the wake of Necco's 2018 shuttering, Haviland Thin Mints along with Mighty Malt Milk Balls were sold to Minnesota-based Log House Food.

Haviland Thin Mints also come in flavors such as Raspberry Crème and Orange Crème.

== See also ==
- List of chocolate bar brands
- List of confectionery brands
