= Candy Buttons =

Round peg candy brand sold by NECCO

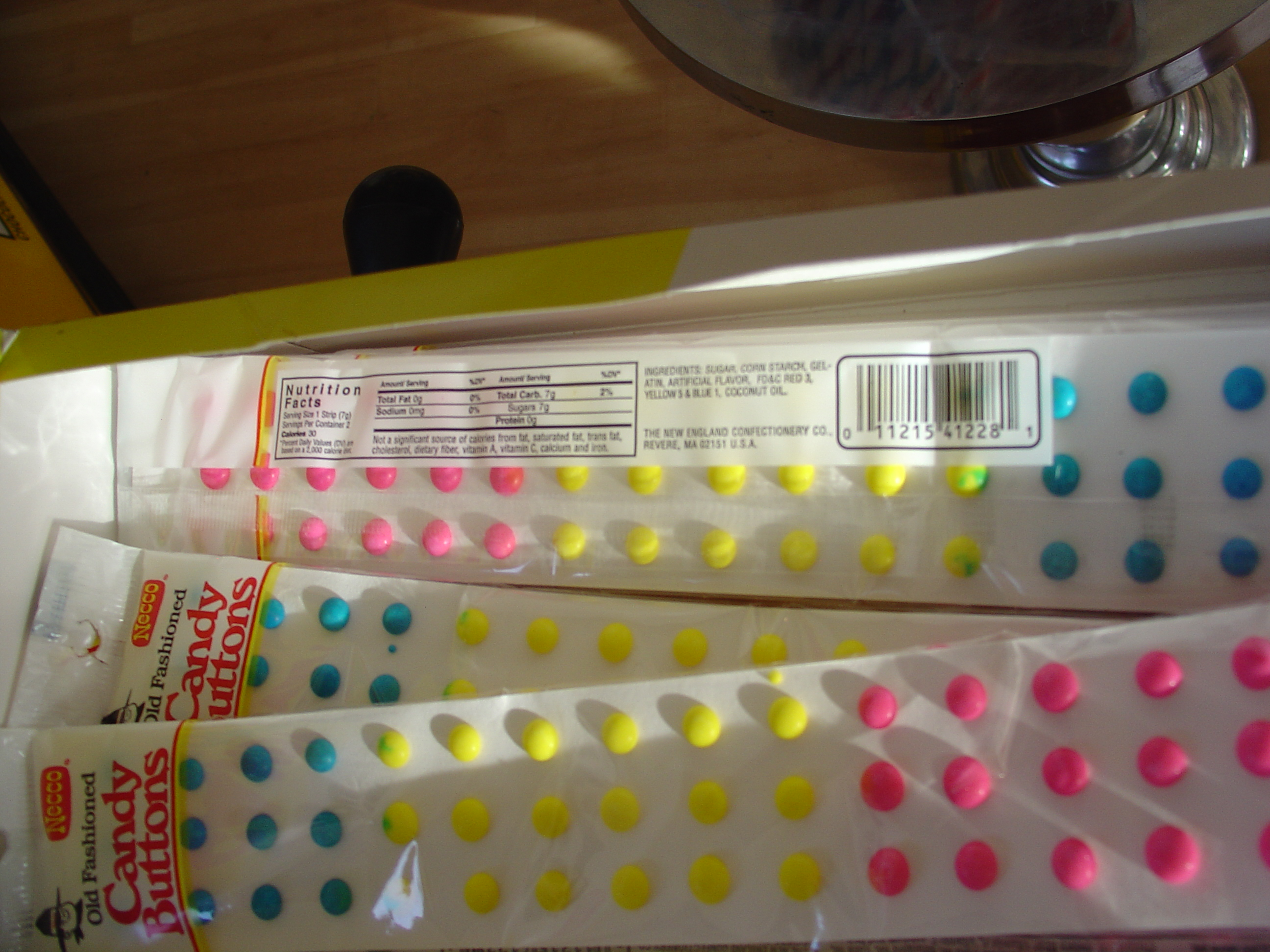
Candy Buttons

Candy Buttons, Candy Dots, or Pox are small rounded flat pegs of candy that are attached to a strip of paper. This classic sugar candy was originally introduced by the Cumberland Valley company and J Sudak and Son of Williamsburg, Brooklyn. In 1977, Sudak, which changed its name to Uncle Nibbles Candy Factory, sold to a repackager in Manhattan named CeeDee Candy, they sold to NECCO. After that acquisition, Necco bought the Cumberland Valley Company in 1980, which made them the exclusive manufacturer of this product in the United States. Each strip of the candy includes three flavors: cherry (pink), lime (blue), and lemon (yellow). Candy Buttons come in two strip sizes: long and short. The long is 22 1/2 inches, while the short is 11 1/4 inches. NECCO made 750 million candy buttons in the course of a year. Following NECCO's 2018 bankruptcy, Candy Buttons were bought at auction by Cincinnati's Doscher's Candies. They were subsequently the first former Necco candy back to market.

Engineer and inventor George Theofiel Dib is credited with the invention of the candy button machine.

== See also ==
- List of confectionery brands
