= Horseshoe shape =

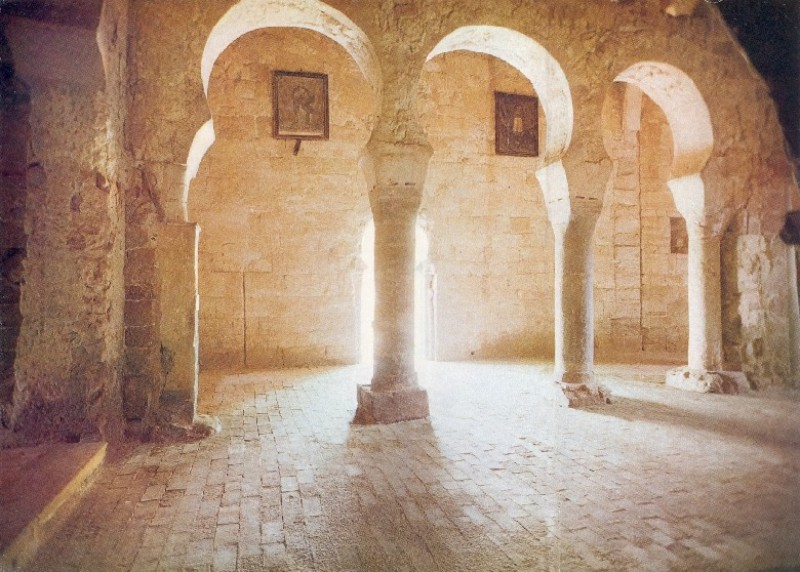
Horseshoe arches from the church of S. Millan Cogolla

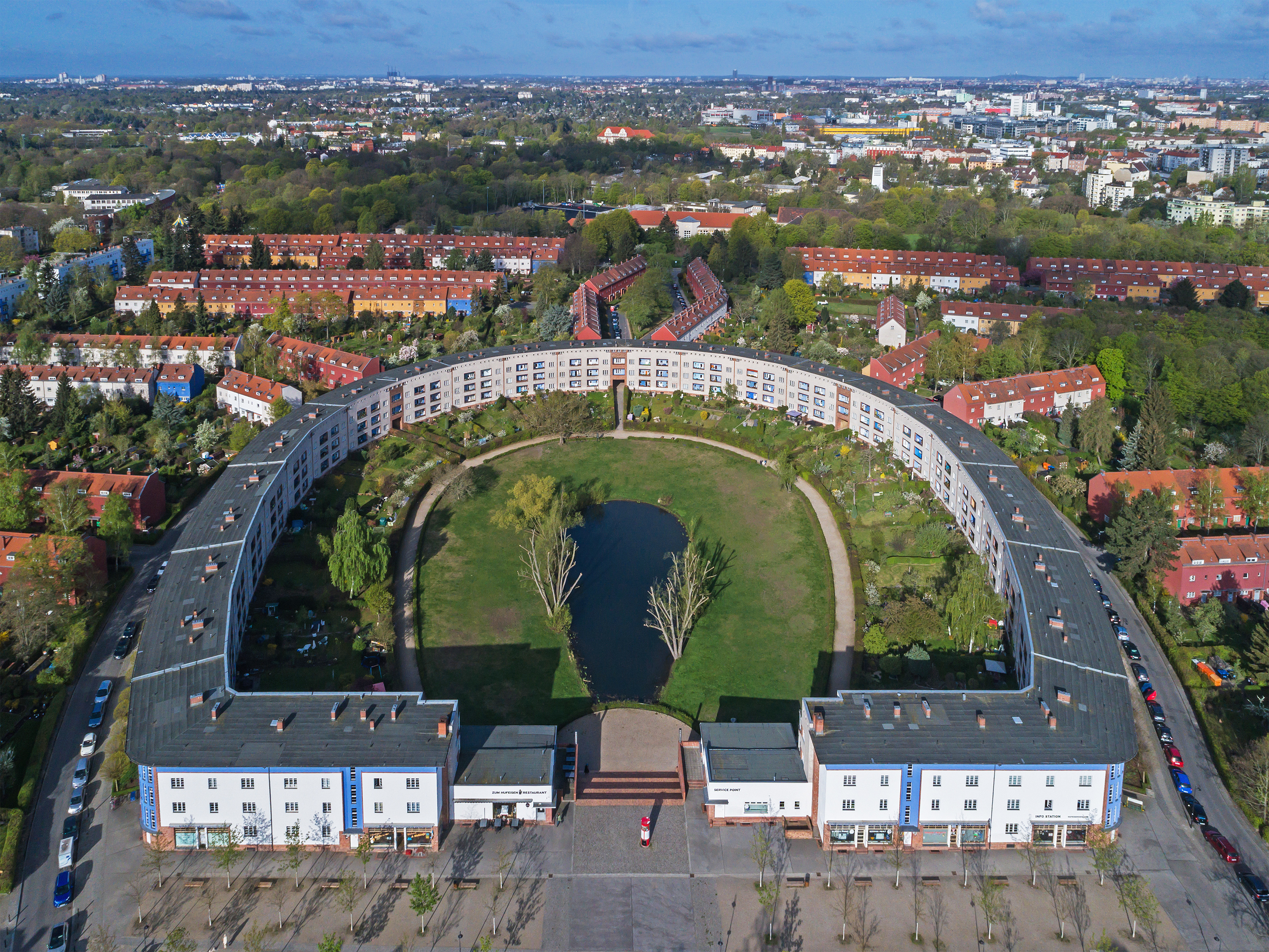
Aerial view of the «Horseshoe Block» in Berlin (Germany), looking west

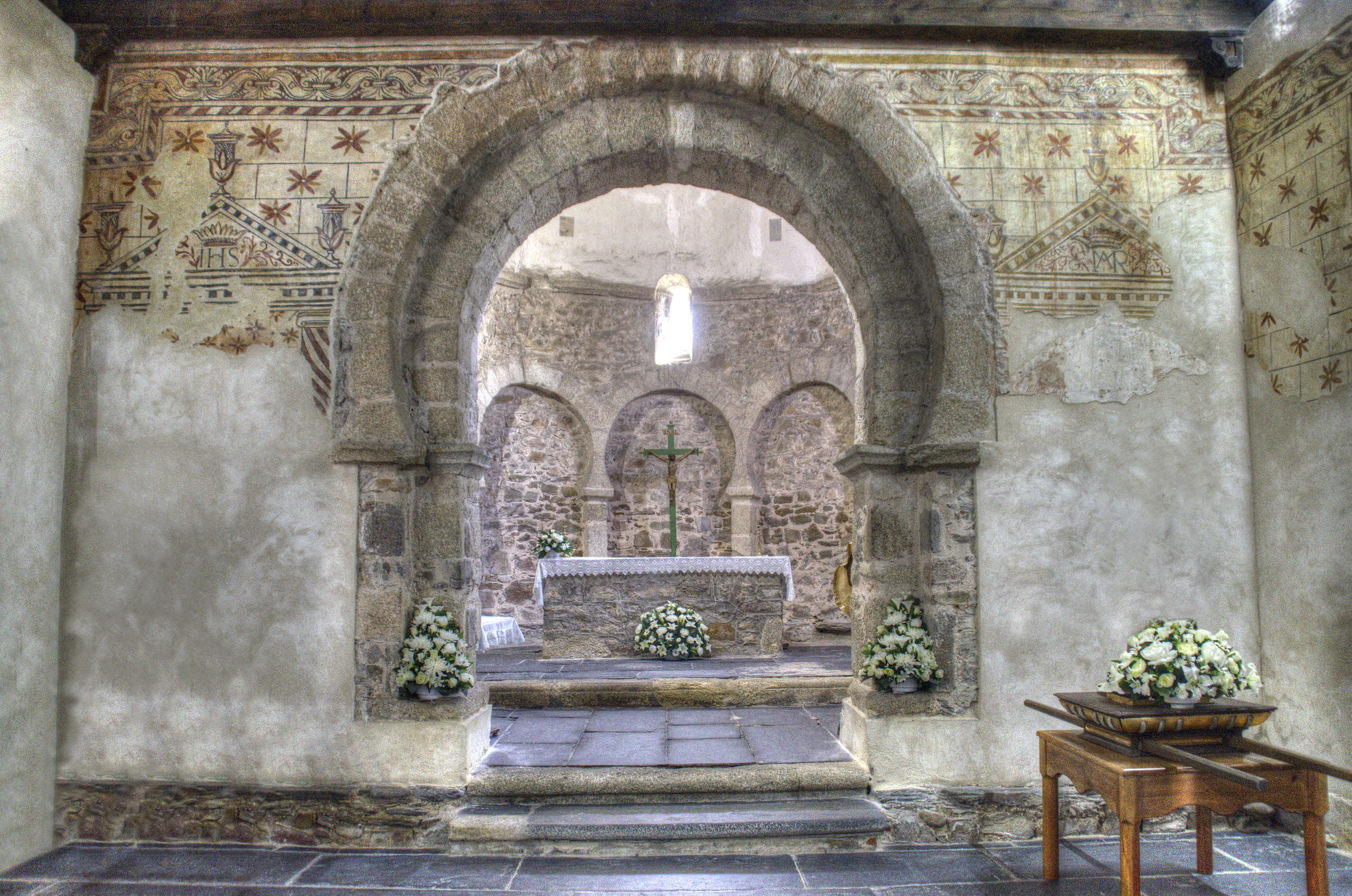
The horseshoe ground planned apse of Santo Tomás de las Ollas

Horseshoe shape is a shape in which the length of the opening is approximately between a third or a quarter of a circle's circumference. It therefore resembles a horseshoe. Something with this kind of shape is referred to as being 'hippocrepiform'.

The shape is sometimes described as keyhole, omega-shaped or moon-like. It occurs most frequently in the horseshoe that gives it its name. It is also common in Visigothic and Islamic architecture as an arch shape. The windows can also have a horseshoe shape. Such windows are found in Indian temples. If the windows are not designed to provide light, they serve as a decorative element.

Another field of application is the use of this shape in the floor plan of buildings. Since ancient times, there have been various functions attributed to a horseshoe shape. In Spain, for example, they occur in civil architecture, tomb architecture, cave architecture and church architecture.

The shape is also used in modern buildings, such as the design of opera houses. The stage at Opéra Garnier in Paris or the auditorium at Musiktheater im Revier in Gelsenkirchen-Schalke, for example, are designed in this form. In addition, there are settlements whose concept is based on this form, for which the Berlin Hufeisensiedlung or Kirchmöser-Ost housing estate can be mentioned.
