= Fruit sours =

Type of confectionery

- Type: Confectionery
- Main ingredients: Gelatin, flavoring

Fruit sours is a confectionery that is normally sold in bulk. Each piece is spherical and about 15mm in diameter. They come in a variety of colors; typically red (strawberry), orange, yellow (lemon), green (apple or lime), and purple (berry or black currant). Fruit sours are comparable to jelly beans in texture, with a soft candy center and a glazed outer shell. They are also mildly tart and tangy in flavor, due to citric acid and malic acid which are sometimes crystals that coat the sweets. Gourmet varieties will have a more prominent fruit-flavoring added.

A 4 oz. serving of fruit sours contains about 400 calories with 105 grams of carbohydrates.
