= Bit-O-Honey =

American candy product

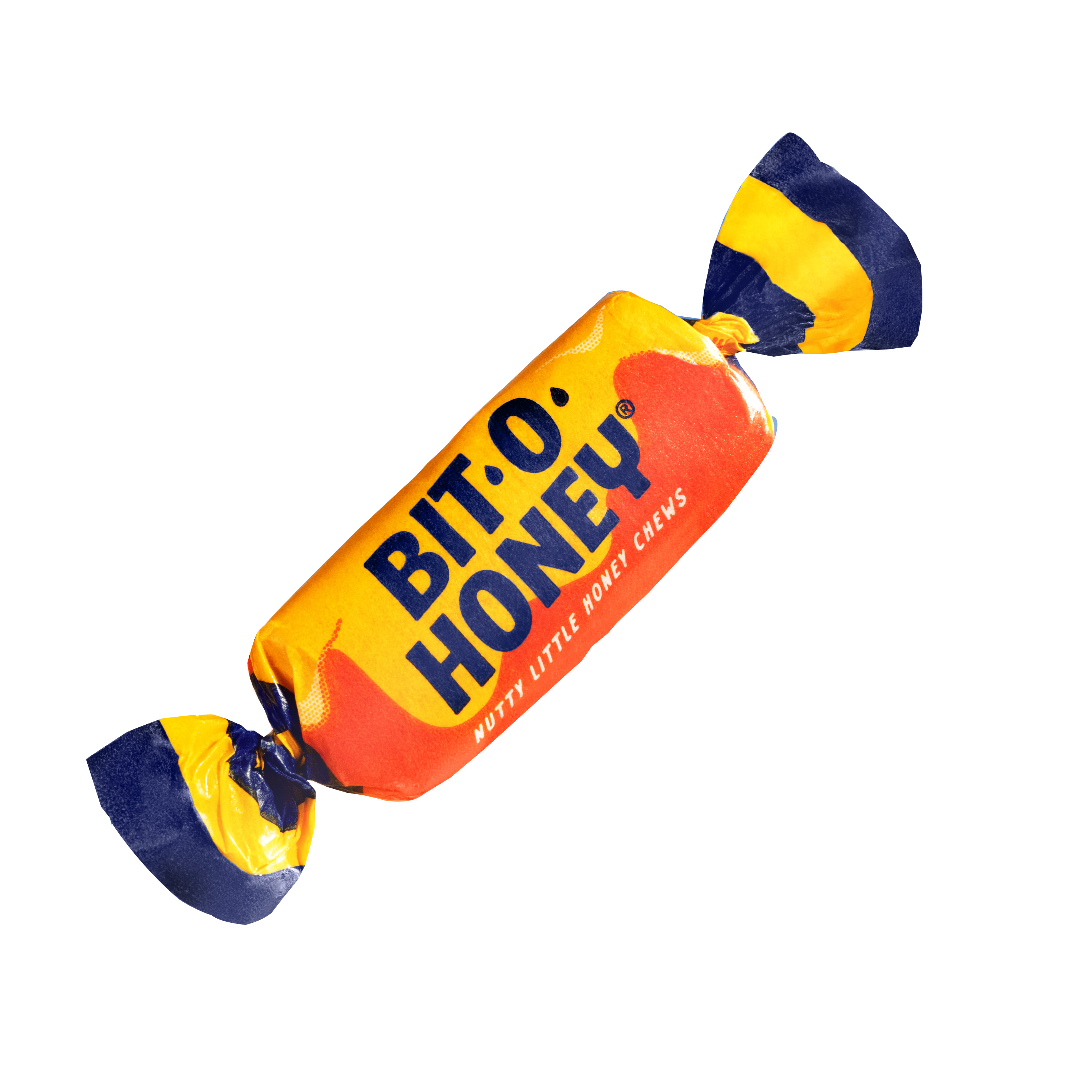
- Bit-O-Honey Wrapper
- Product type: Confectionery
- Current owner: Spangler Candy Company
- Country: United States
- Introduced: 1924; 102 years ago
- Markets: United States
- Previous owners: Schutter Candy Co. (1924—1966); Ward Foods, Inc. (1966—1981); Terson (1981—1984); Nestlé (1984—2013); Pearson's (2013—2020)
- Tagline: A Little Chew To Get You Through
- Website: bitohoney.com

Bit-O-Honey is an American candy, introduced in 1924 by the Schutter-Johnson Company of Chicago. It is currently owned by the Bryan, Ohio-based Spangler Candy Company.

Bit-O-Honey is a honey-flavored taffy with almonds. It is sold as individually wrapped, bite-sized candies, available in bags or theater-size boxes. Bit-O-Honey was formerly sold as a bar that was divided into six segments, with an interior wax paper wrapping and an exterior plasticized paper wrapper. Texture-wise, Bit-O-Honey is similar to Atkinson's Mary Jane candy.

== History ==
After introducing Bit-O-Honey in 1924, Schutter-Johnson merged in 1969 with Blumenthal Brothers Chocolate Company (later Ward Candy Company) of New York City, makers of other candies, including Oh Henry! and Raisinets. Between the mid- and late-1970s, a chocolate-flavored version called Bit-O-Chocolate was offered and subsequently dropped.

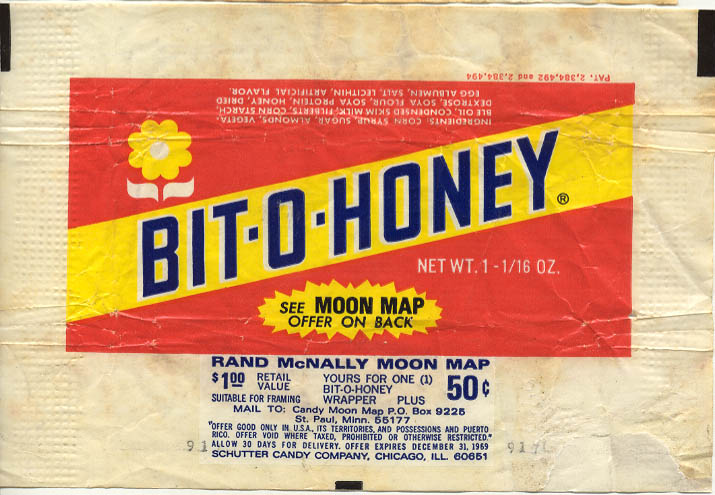
Bit-O-Honey wrapper, circa 1969

Other spin-offs included Bit o' Licorice and Bit-O-Peanut Butter.

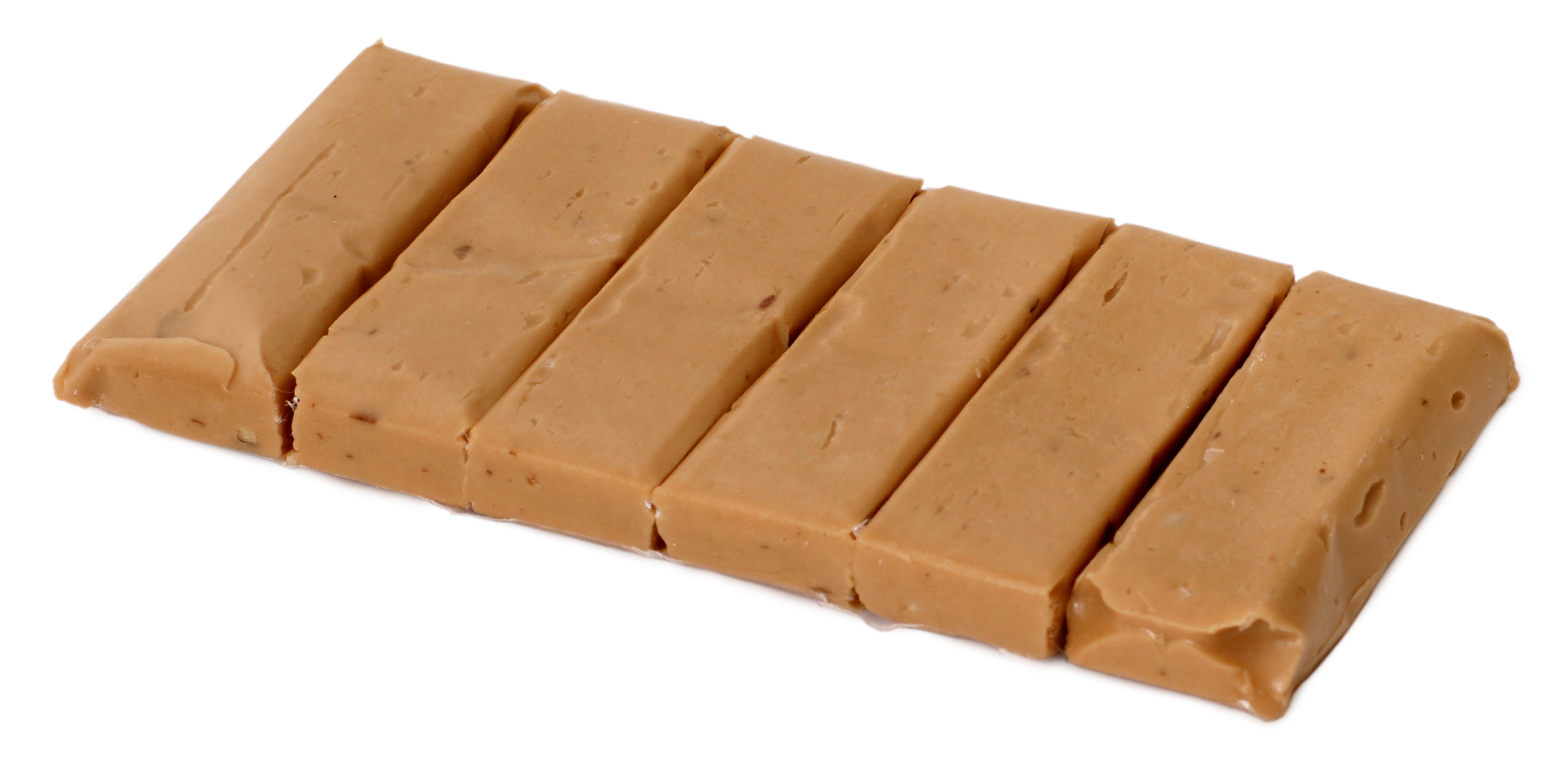
An unwrapped Bit-O-Honey bar

Bit-O-Honey and Ward's other brands were acquired by Chicago-based Terson Company in 1981. The eventual sale of Bit-O-Honey brand happened in 1984, when the Terson Company sold Ward Candy brands to Nestlé Company on January 9, 1984.

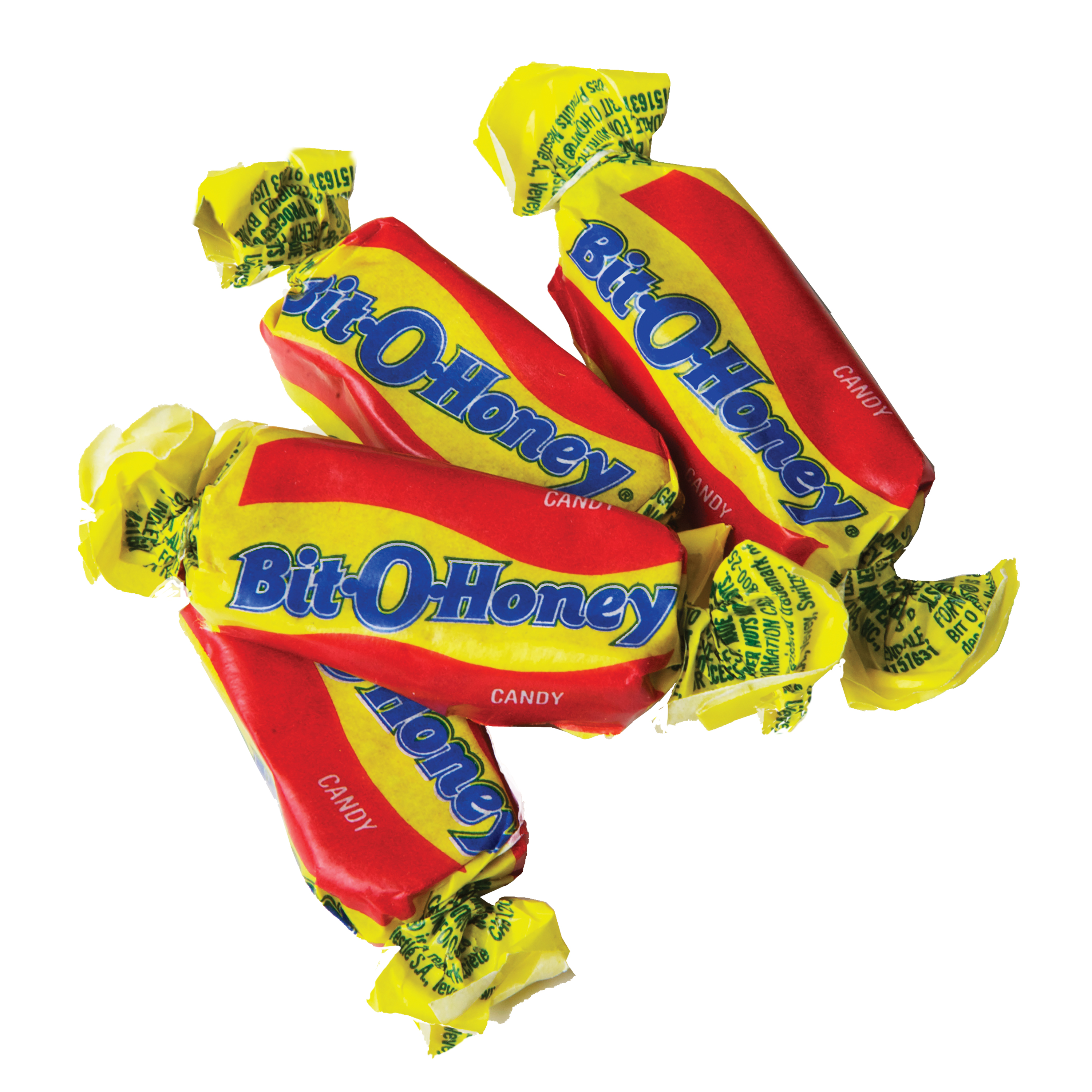
Bit-O-Honey wrapper, circa 2010

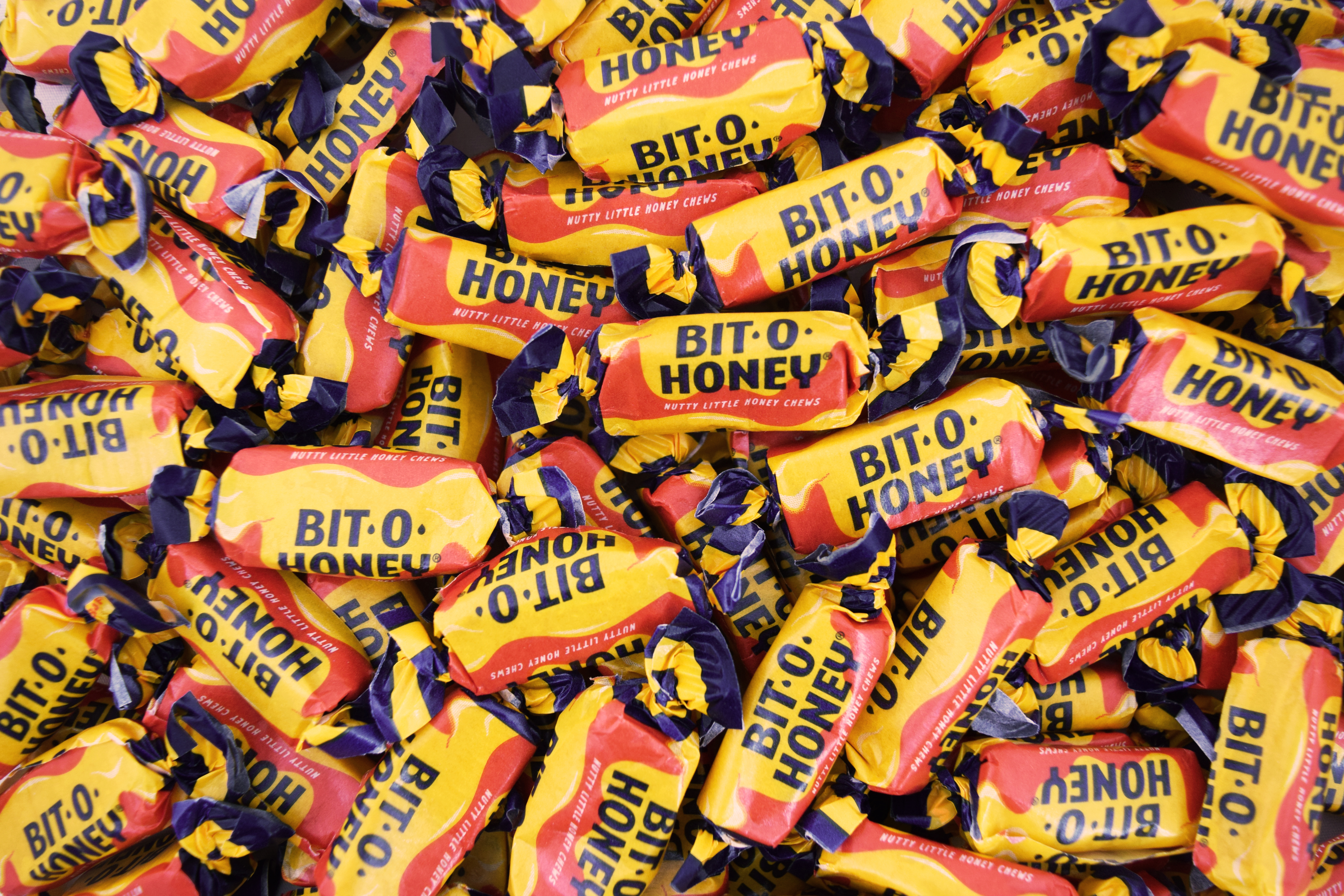
Bit-O-Honey penny candy pieces

In May 2013, Nestlé sold the Bit-O-Honey brand to Pearson's Candy Company of Saint Paul, Minnesota. In 2017, Bit-O-Honey Chocolate was briefly reintroduced. Spangler Candy Company of Bryan, Ohio, acquired the brand in November 2020. In late 2022, Spangler moved Bit-O-Honey manufacturing equipment from its former home in Saint Paul to Bryan. Production in the new facility started in January 2023.

== Ingredients ==
As of 2025, Bit-O-Honey's ingredients are: corn syrup, sugar, nonfat milk, hydrogenated coconut oil, almonds (almonds, canola and/or safflower and/or sunflower oil), honey, salt, egg whites, and natural flavor.

== See also ==
- Mary Jane
- Squirrel Nut Zippers
- List of almond dishes
