= Circus peanut =

American marshmallow candy

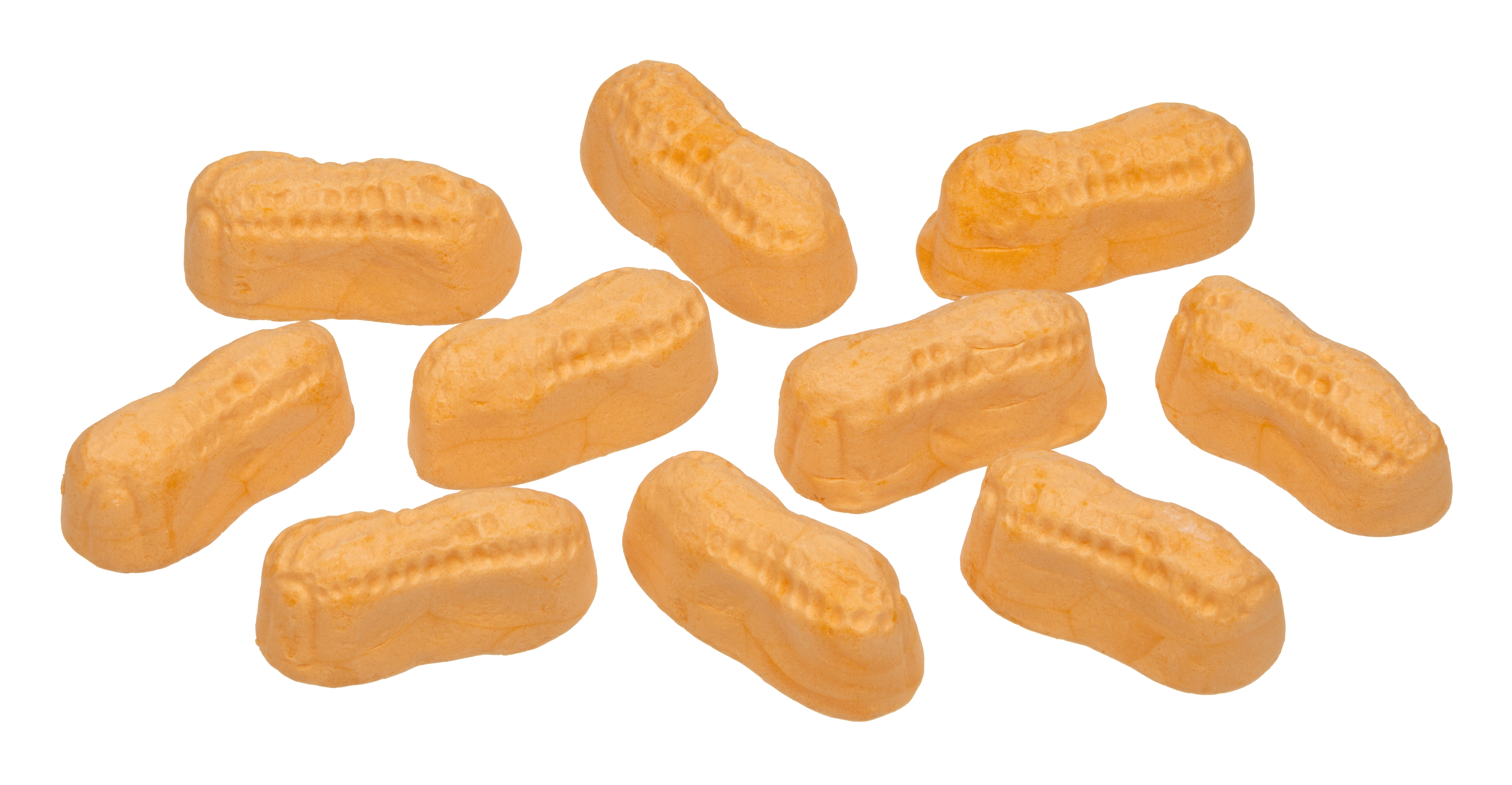
- Type: Confectionery
- Main ingredients: Sugar, corn syrup, gelatin, pectin, soy protein, food coloring, artificial flavor
- Food energy (per 15 pieces serving): 150 kcal (630 kJ)

Circus peanuts are American peanut-shaped marshmallow candy. They date to the 19th century, when they were one of a large variety of unwrapped "penny candy" sold in such retail outlets as five-and-dime stores.

As of the 2010s, the most familiar variety of mass-produced circus peanuts is orange-colored and flavored with an artificial banana flavor. These are typically made from sugar, corn syrup, gelatin, pectin, soy protein, food coloring and artificial flavor. Confectioners originally distributed an orange-flavored variety that was only available seasonally due to a lack of packaging capable of preserving the candy. In the spring, five-and-dimes sold circus peanuts as penny candy. In the 1940s, circus peanuts became one of the many candies to become available year-round owing to the industrial proliferation of cellophane packaging.

Over the years, confectioners have also offered circus peanuts colored yellow, pink, and white, including a variety of flavors, though orange is still the most predominant color and banana the most common flavor. The leading producers of circus peanuts are Melster Candies, Spangler Candy Company and Brach's, although the products are essentially identical.

Circus Peanuts were later used in an early version of what would become the Lucky Charms breakfast cereal. In 1964 General Mills management challenged a team of product developers to create a new unique cereal. After a visit to a grocery store, product developer John Holahan decided to mix Cheerios with bits of circus peanuts.

== See also ==
- Lucky Charms, a breakfast cereal that used Circus Peanuts in an early version.
- Peeps, marshmallow candy shaped like a chick.
- Jet-Puffed Marshallows, American brand of marshmallows.
- Flumps, a UK brand of rope shaped marshmallow candy.
