= Apple drops =

British confection

Apple drops are a type of hard boiled sweet and are a variety of pick 'n' mix or penny sweet. Ingredients can vary slightly depending on company and brand, but typically they are made using sugar, glucose syrup, citric acid, E330, natural flavour (often apple juice concentrate), and natural colours E100 and E141.

Apple drops were mainly popular in the United Kingdom and Ireland during the 1980s and 1990s, with demand for them sharply dropping after that time. The sweets are now usually found only in smaller independent shops or from larger retailers at an increased price.

== See also ==
- Red Hots
