= Freak Lunchbox =

Canadian confectionery retailer

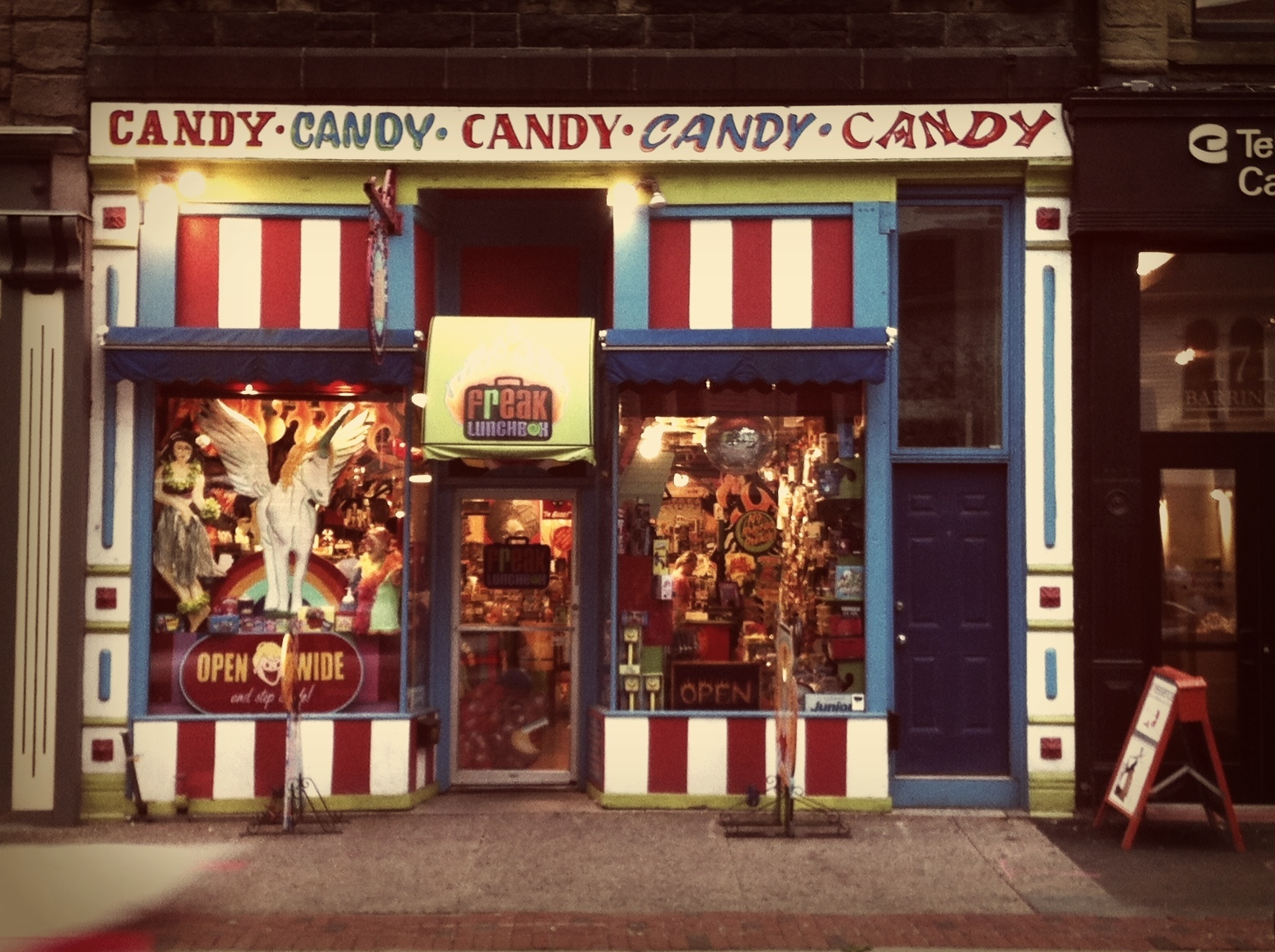
- Company type: Private
- Industry: Confectionery
- Genre: Retail
- Founded: 2001
- Headquarters: 1729 Barrington Street, Halifax, Nova Scotia, Canada
- Number of locations: 8 (2025)
- Owners: Jeremy Smith & Erin Schwanz
- Website: freaklunchbox.com

Freak Lunchbox is a Canadian chain of confectionery retailers headquartered in Halifax, Nova Scotia. The company was established in 2001, opening its first location on Barrington Street in Halifax. In 2015, the company purchased and renovated an adjacent building to establish a new flagship store, which has received international recognition for the mural painted on the side of the building. With eight retail locations across Canada, Freak Lunchbox offers a wide selection of specialty candies, including in bulk self-serve bins, as well as a range of novelty items and gadgets.

== History ==
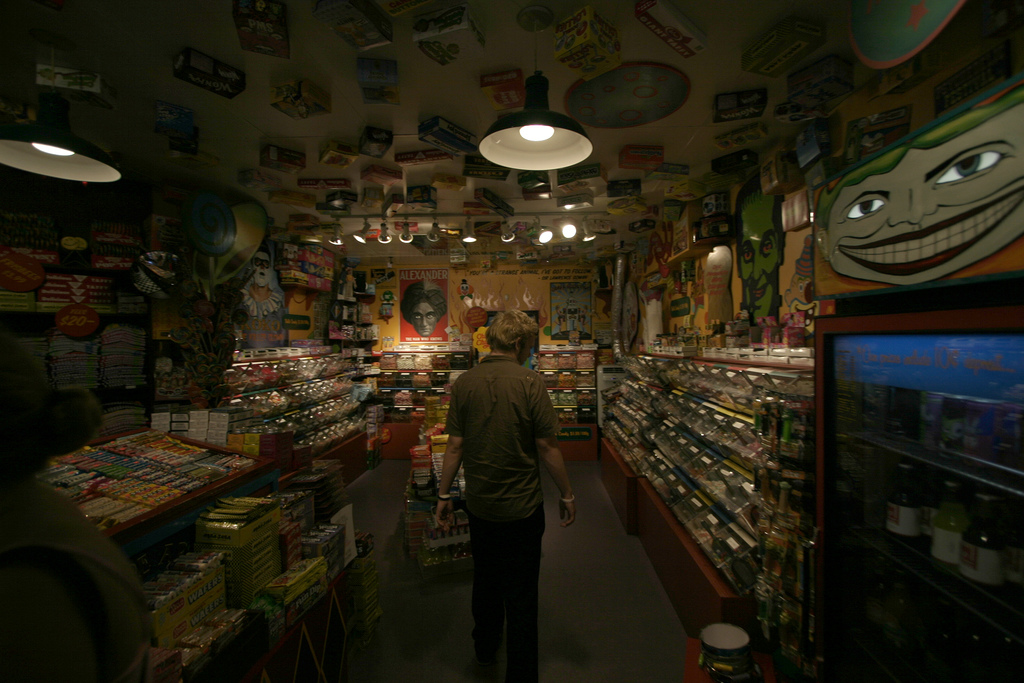
Interior of Freak Lunchbox in Halifax

Freak Lunchbox was founded in 2001 by husband and wife Jeremy Smith and Erin Schwanz. Smith, having completed five years at the Ontario College of Art and Design, initially worked as a painter in Toronto before relocating to Halifax. Following their move to Halifax, the couple opened the first Freak Lunchbox location at 1723 Barrington Street. The company subsequently opened additional locations in Nova Scotia and Alberta. In January 2015, the company purchased the nearby Crowe Building at 1729 Barrington Street, constructed in 1912, and began renovations for a new storefront.

=== Mural ===
In 2000, artist Zeqirja Rexhepi painted a mural entitled "Tall Ships 2000" on the side of 1729 Barrington Street in Halifax. The mural was funded in part by the City of Halifax, through a grant to the Downtown Halifax Business Commission. In April 2015, shortly after purchasing the building, Freak Lunchbox owners Jeremy Smith and Erin Schwanz announced plans to replace the mural with new candy-themed artwork. This decision sparked public criticism, particularly from Rexhepi, who felt insufficient efforts were made to preserve the mural. In response to the backlash, Smith explained he had done everything he could to save the mural, including offering to move it, without success. Rexhepi later acknowledged that he understood Freak Lunchbox's desire to move the mural after reconsidering the situation.

Sketches for the new ocean-themed mural were approved by Heritage Council on September 1, 2015. The mural was completed on September 8 by Montreal muralist Jason Botkin for a total cost of $12,000. Despite prior controversy, the mural was well-received and gained international recognition. In July 2021, it was announced that the artwork would soon be hidden from public view due to the construction of a new nine-story development on the adjacent lot.

== Products ==
Freak Lunchbox stores concentrate on offering specialty confectionery products, including retro candies, soft drinks, and a diverse selection of bulk candies available in self-serve bins. The stores also offer a variety of novelty items and gadgets. Alongside its physical locations, Freak Lunchbox operates a retail website featuring various prepackaged gift boxes for sale.

== Locations ==
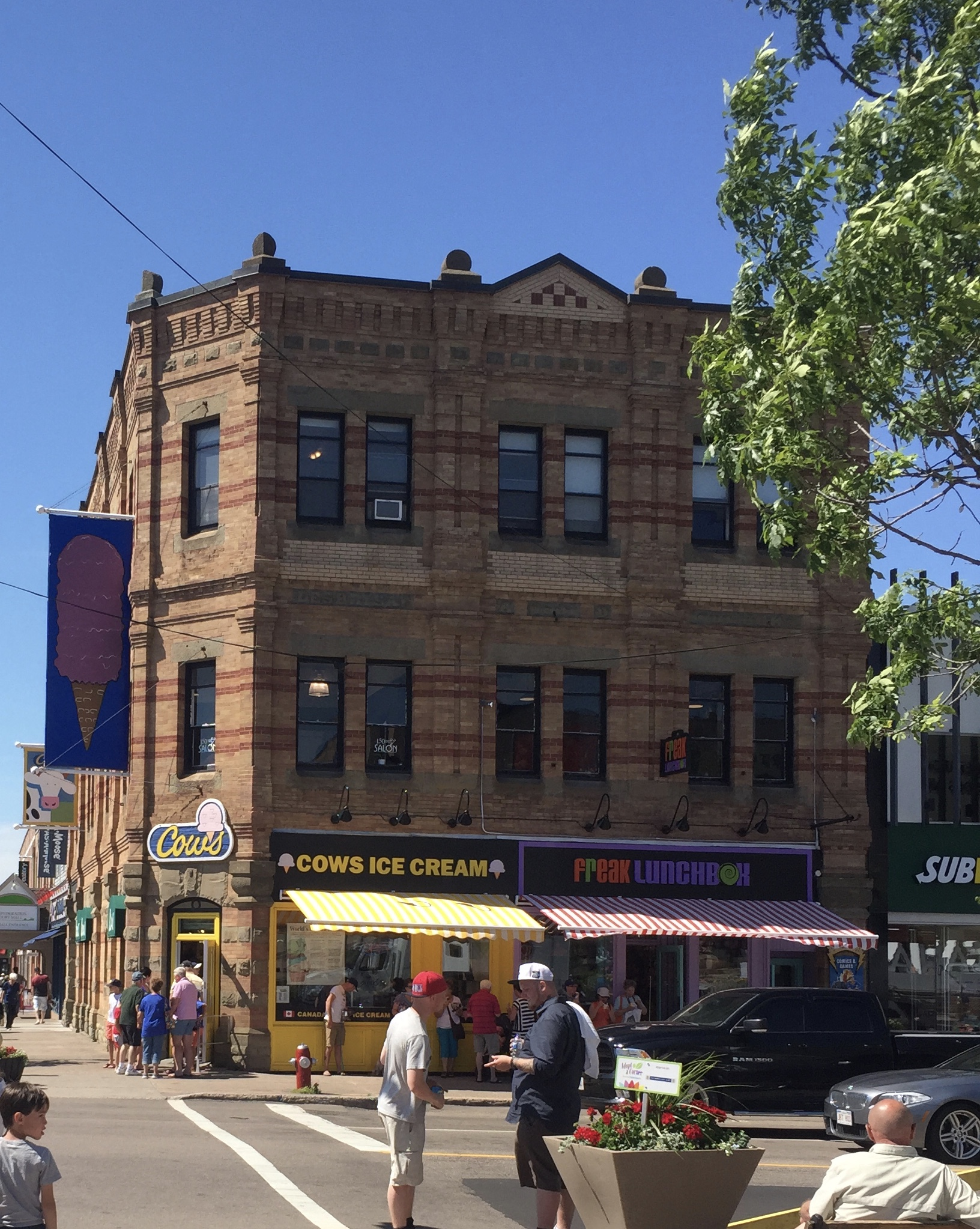
Freak Lunchbox Charlottetown location

Freak Lunchbox has a total of eight retail locations as of 2025, with four situated in Nova Scotia and the remaining four distributed between New Brunswick and Newfoundland.

The company established a location on 17th Avenue in Calgary in 2012; however, this store closed in 2018 due to rising rental costs. The company opened a store in Charlottetown in 2016, which closed in 2020 as a result of economic difficulties associated with the COVID-19 pandemic.

Freak Lunchbox has two locations in St. John's, Newfoundland: the first on Water Street, and a second in the Avalon Mall, which opened in November 2021. In New Brunswick, the company has locations in Saint John and Dieppe, while in Nova Scotia, it has two in Halifax, one in Dartmouth, and one in Bedford.

== Reception ==
Freak Lunchbox was included by Andrea Karr in Reader's Digest Canada's 2022 list of 40 incredible things to do in Calgary. Jennifer Bain of Today's Parent mentioned Freak Lunchbox in a 2024 list of 14 best things to do in St. John’s with children. CBC's Gabby Peyton included Freak Lunchbox in a 2021 list of places to purchase sweets in St. John's, referring to the store as "bright and colourful". Freak Lunchbox in Halifax has attracted celebrity clientele, including figures such as Tom Selleck, Lucy Liu, and Pierce Brosnan, among others.
