= Dum Dums =

American brand of lollipops

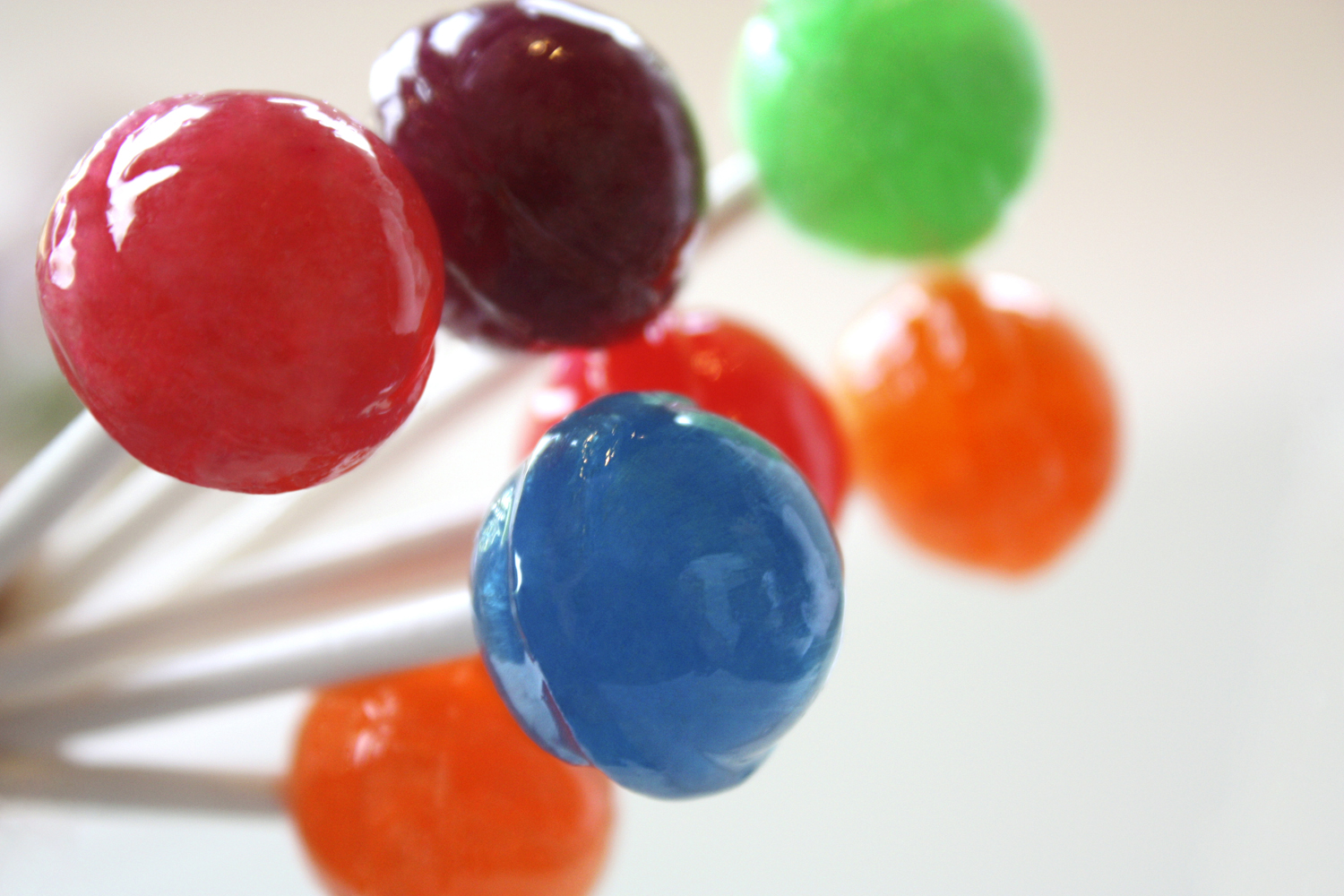
- Current owner: Spangler Candy Company
- Country: United States
- Introduced: 1924; 102 years ago
- Previous owners: Akron Candy Company
- Website: dumdumpops.com

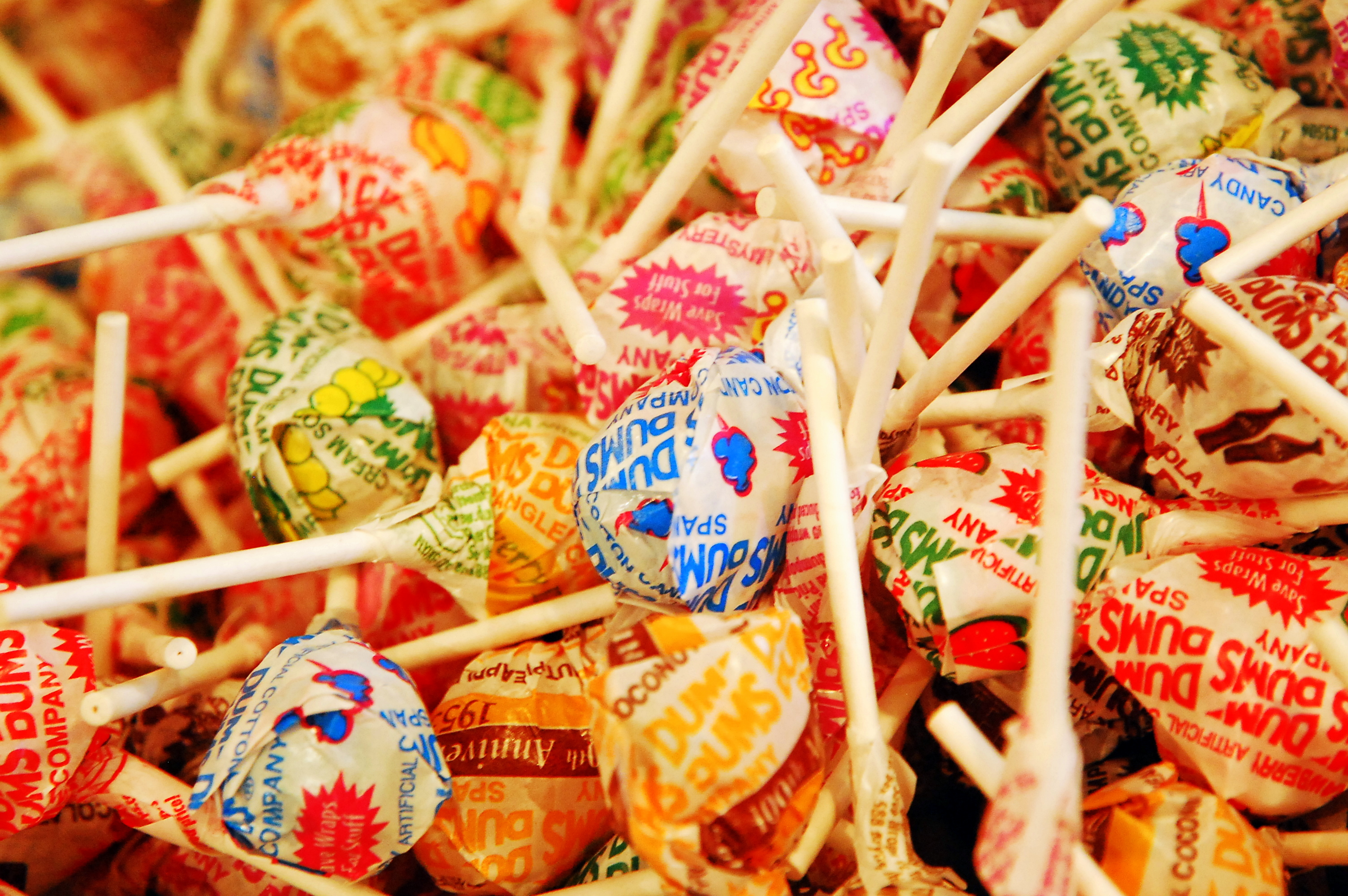
Assorted wrapped Dum Dums

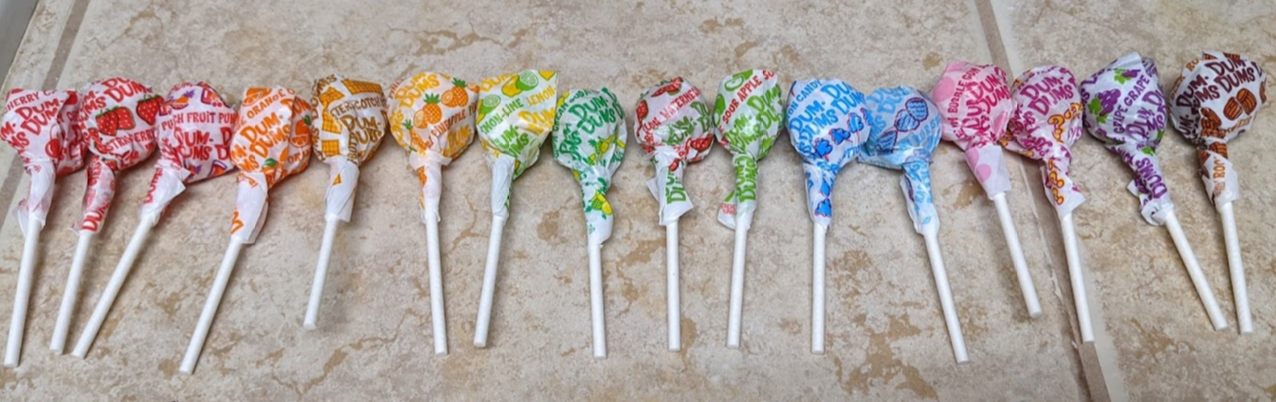
All 16 flavors of Dum Dums. From left to right: cherry, strawberry, fruit punch, orange, butterscotch, pineapple, lemon-lime, cream soda, watermelon, sour apple, cotton candy, blue raspberry, bubble gum, mystery flavor, grape, and root beer.

Dum Dums (stylized as Dum•Dums) are an American brand of spherical lollipops.

== History ==
Dum Dums originated from Akron Candy Company in Bellevue, Ohio, in 1924. I. C. Bahr, the early sales manager of the company, named them, thinking "Dum Dums" was a phrase any child could say. In 1953, Dum Dums were purchased by the Spangler Candy Company and manufacturing moved to Bryan, Ohio.

Initially, there were 7 flavors: lemon, lime, orange, coconut-pineapple, cherry, grape, and butterscotch.

Spangler once experimented with plastic sticks instead of the current paper sticks, but they were met with complaints of potential injury due to the possible breakage of the unbending plastic in manufacturing leading to plastic fragments in the candy.

== Production ==
Approximately 12 million Dum Dum lollipops are produced per day in Bryan, Ohio.

== Flavors ==
As of 2015, Dum Dums are made in 18 flavors, with new flavors rotating into the mix every so often, most recently a birthday cake flavor for the 100th anniversary. The "Mystery Flavor" is the result of the end of one batch, mixing with the next batch, rather than stopping production to clean machines in between flavors.

=== Current flavors ===
- Blue raspberry (1991–present)
- Bubble gum (2002–2018, ???-present)
- Butterscotch (1924–present)
- Cherry (1924–present)
- Cotton candy (2002–2018, ???-present)
- Cream soda (1968–present)
- Dragonfruit (2018–present)
- Fruit punch (2000–2002, 2011–present)
- Grape (1924–present)
- Lemon-lime (2015–present)
- Mystery flavor (2001-present)
- Orange (1924–2000, 2011–present)
- Peach-mango (2013–present)
- Pineapple (1970–1991, 2017–present)
- Berry lemonade (2013–2015, 2018–present)
- Root beer (1953–1961, 1968–present)
- Sour apple (1991–2000, 2001–present)
- Strawberry (1954–present)
- Watermelon (1982–present)

=== Original mix ===
- Blue raspberry (1991–present???)
- Bubble gum (2002–2018, ???-present???)
- Butterscotch (1924–present???)
- Cherry (1924–present???)
- Cotton candy (2002–2018, ???-present???)
- Cream soda (1968–present???)
- Fruit punch (2000–2002, 2011–present???)
- Grape (1924–present???)
- Lemon-lime (2015–present???)
- Mystery flavor (2001-present???)
- Orange (1924–2000, 2011–present???)
- Peach-mango (2013–present???)
- Pineapple (1970–1991, 2017–present???)
- Root beer (1953–1961, 1968–present???)
- Sour apple (1991–2000, 2001–present???)
- Strawberry (1954–present???)
- Watermelon (1982–present???)

=== Tropical mix ===
- Berry lemonade (???)
- Blueberry burst (???)
- Dragonfruit (???)
- Lemon-lime (??)
- Peach-mango (2013-present???)
- Pineapple-coconut (???)
- Strawberry-kiwi (???)
- Tropical freeze (???)

=== Super treats mix ===
- Banana split (???)
- Berry lemonade (???)
- Birthday cake (???)
- Blueberry burst (???)
- Carmel apple (???)
- Cinnamon roll (???)
- Cotton candy (2002–2018, ???-present???)
- Dragonfruit (2018–present???)
- Hot chocolate (???)
- Lemon-lime (2015–present???)
- Mystery flavor (2001-present???)
- Peach-mango (2013-present???)
- Pineapple-coconut (???)
- Strawberry-kiwi (???)
- Strawberry milkshake (???)
- Sugar cookie (???)
- Tropical freeze (???)

=== Heart pops flavors ===
- Cherry-berry (???)
- Cherry-cotton candy (???)
- Cherry-lemonade (???)
- Cherry-passionfruit (???)

=== Bunny pops flavors ===
- Tropi-berry (???)
- Berry blu cherry (???)
- Berry melon (???)
- Berry lemonade (???)

=== Candy cane flavors ===
- Blu raspberry (???)
- Cherry (???)
- Watermelon (???)

=== Discontinued flavors ===
- Banana (1960–1966, 2005–2008)
- Banana split (2009–2011, 2016)
- Black cherry (1968–1970)(But still can be found at party city)
- Blueberry (2010–2017)
- Buttered popcorn (2000–2001, 2015)
- Cherry cola (2005–2009)
- Chocolate (1955–1960, 1966–1975, 2002–2008)
- Coconut (2008–2010)
- Coconut–pineapple (1924–1970, 2005–2008)
- Dulce de leche (2011–2013)
- Lemon (1924–2000)
- Lime (1924–1991)
- Mango (2008–2013)
- Orange cream (2000–2002, ???)
- Peach (1987–2002)
- Pink lemonade (2005–2009)
- Raspberry (1961–1968, 1975–1995)
- Raspberry lemonade (???)
- Strawberry shortcake (2009–2011)
- Tangerine (2008–2011)

=== Limited–time flavors ===
- Bacon (2015)
- Hawaiian Punch Fruit Juicy Red (2014, 2017)
- Hawaiian Punch Polar Blast (2014, 2017)
- Kool Korsunsky (2010 Competition flavor)
- Mystery Mania (2011)
- Pizza (2015)
- S'mores (2016)
- Strawberry milkshake (2016)
- Apple cider (Holiday flavor)
- Hot chocolate (Holiday flavor)
- Gingerbread (Holiday flavor)
- Polar Punch (Holiday flavor)
- Sugar cookie (Holiday flavor)
- Sugar plum (Holiday flavor)
- Merry Cherry (Holiday flavor)
- Green Apple Grinch (Holiday flavor)
- Cinnamon Roll (Holiday flavor)
- Winter Citrus (Holiday flavor)
- Shirley Temple (Dollar Tree)

== See also ==
- List of confectionery brands
