= Spangler Candy Company =

American confectionery company

- Formerly: Spangler Manufacturing Company (1906–1920)
- Type: Private
- Industry: Confectionery
- Founded: August 20, 1906; 119 years ago (as Spangler Manufacturing Company)
- Founder: Arthur G. Spangler
- Headquarters: 400 N Portland St. Bryan, Ohio, U.S. 43506
- Key people: Kirk Vashaw (Chairman & CEO)
- Products: Candy
- Number of employees: 650
- Website: spanglercandycompany.com

The Spangler Candy Company is a privately owned confectioner that has been manufacturing and marketing candy for more than a century. Headquartered in Bryan, Ohio, Spangler's products include lollipops, candy canes, and marshmallow circus peanuts. Spangler brand names include Dum-Dums, Bit-O-Honey, Necco Wafers, Sweetheart Candies, Spangler Candy Canes, Spangler Circus Peanuts, and Canada Mints. Dum-Dums, the company's most recognized brand, were invented in 1924, and Spangler purchased the rights and equipment in 1953. The small multicolor lollipops are popular as free giveaways. In 2018, Spangler bought various assets and brands from the defunct Necco, retaining the rights to Necco Wafers, Sweethearts conversation hearts, and Canada Mints. In 2020, Spangler bought the rights to Bit-O-Honey from Pearson Candy Company.

Spangler is the second largest employer in Bryan, Ohio. Spangler gives Bryan its identity as the "Dum-Dums Capital of the World" and the largest manufacturer of candy canes in the country. The company produces approximately 45% of the candy canes sold in the United States and produces over 12 million Dum-Dums per day.

== History ==
Spangler Candy Company was established August 20, 1906 when Arthur G. Spangler purchased the Gold Leaf Baking Powder Company of Defiance, Ohio, for $450 and moved it to 204 W. High Street in Bryan, Ohio. The new company was named Spangler Manufacturing Company and produced baking soda, baking powder, corn starch, laundry starch, spices, and flavorings.

In 1908, Ernest Spangler joined the company and suggested adding candy to the product line. In 1911, the Spangler Cocoanut Ball became the first candy manufactured by Spangler. In 1913, the business moved to its present location on North Portland Street in Bryan, Ohio. In 1914 Omar Spangler joined the company, bringing mechanical and bookkeeping knowledge. In those early years, Spangler manufactured Creme Peanut Clusters, Cocoanut Balls, Bryan Drops, hand-dipped chocolates, chocolate bars, ice cream cones, soda pop, and cough drops.

In 1920, the company's name was changed to Spangler Candy Company, and Truman Spangler joined as a salesman. By 1922, hard candy equipment had been purchased and stick candy was being manufactured; one of the most successful hard candies was the penny apple sucker. Chocolate equipment was also purchased that year, eliminating the need to hand-dip chocolate items. A variety of 60 products were being made and shipped from Spangler Candy Company. In 1927, Spangler founded a wholesaling subsidiary in Maumee, Ohio, and in 1931 acquired Hickok Honeycomb Chocolate of Sydney, Ohio.

In 1940, Spangler created their Marshmallow Circus Peanuts, their version of a popular penny candy. The following year, Marshmallow Topping was introduced and became popular as a sugar substitute during World War II. Founder Arthur Spangler died in a boating accident in 1945, and in 1946 the company was reorganized from a partnership to a corporation.

The 1950s brought significant expansion. In 1953, Dum Dum Pops were acquired from Akron Candy Co. of Bellevue, Ohio. In 1954, the A-Z Christmas Candy Cane Company of Detroit, Michigan, was acquired, and in 1957 Ohio Confections Fudge of Cleveland, makers of Pecan Divinity, was also acquired.

By 1960, the second generation of Spangler family members were actively managing the company: Ted Spangler served as president and sales manager; Harlan Spangler as treasurer and financial officer; Norman Spangler as secretary and production manager; Frank Spangler in purchasing and product design; Charles Spangler as transportation manager and in sales service; and Albert Spangler managing the Toledo Wholesale operation. Ernest Spangler, then 80, continued as honorary chairman. That year also saw the first union contract signed with Toledo Local 20 of the International Brotherhood of Teamsters. In 1962, Shelby Bubble Gum of Shelby, Ohio, was acquired.

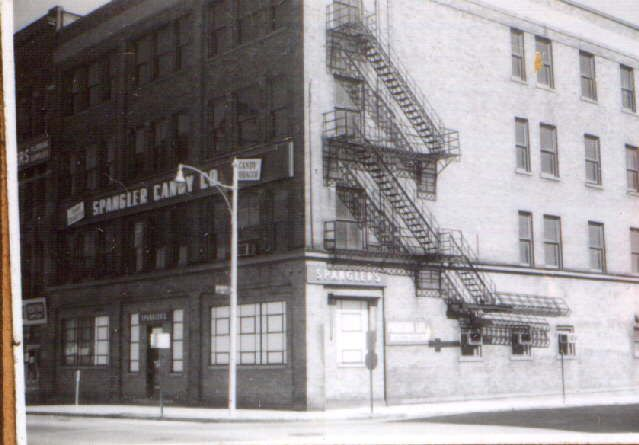
Toledo location in 1962.

In 1965, American Mint Corp. of New York City was acquired. The following year, in April 1966, the Spangler Candy Dum-Dums Drum Man was born, developed by the Howard Swink Advertising Agency of Marion, Ohio. In 1978, Saf-T-Pops was acquired from Curtiss Candy Co. of Chicago, Illinois, and C. Gregory Spangler, a third-generation family member, became President. The company acquired Standard the Candy Cane Company of Detroit, Michigan, in 1980, and the Astro Pops brand from Nellson Candy Co. of Los Angeles, California, in 1987.

In 1990, Spangler sold its subsidiary distributorship, Spangler Candy & Tobacco of Toledo, to concentrate on manufacturing candy. In 1995, the Suck An Egg and Save-A-Sucker brands were acquired from Innovative Confections of Idaho Falls, Idaho. The following year, Dean L. Spangler, a third-generation family member, became President, and Spangler established an internet presence at www.spanglercandy.com.

The 2000s brought further development. In 2001, the Save Wraps for Stuff Program returned along with a new kid-focused website at www.dumdumpops.com. In 2003, Spangler established a relationship with Imagination Confections to market Disney candies. In 2005, the Spangler Foundation was established to honor the second generation, providing community funds and scholarships to local area students, and the Spangler Candy Company Store and Museum opened in late December. Spangler Candy celebrated its 100th year with a gala celebration on August 19, 2006. A book, "A Sweet Century: The 100-Year History of Spangler Candy Company and the Spangler Family", written by William L. Culbertson, was published that year. In June 2007, the Spangler Fulfillment Center began operation as a distribution center for the "Save Wraps for Stuff" program and website items. That same year, Spangler sold its chocolate business to Key III Candies of Fort Wayne, Indiana. In 2008, Kirkland B. Vashaw, a fourth-generation family member, became President.

In 2009, a Dum-Dums Facebook fan page was created in April and a new Flick-A-Pop application went live on iTunes in May. In July 2011, Kirk Vashaw was elected president and CEO, becoming the seventh chief executive in Spangler's 105-year history. Later that year, in September, Ted Spangler, son of founder Arthur Spangler and past director of sales, president, chief executive, and board chairman, died at the age of 92. Dum-Dums became the number one lollipop in late 2011 per IRI scan data. In 2013, Spangler Candy completed its 82nd factory addition, which included new bagging, case packout, and palletizing equipment. In 2014, William G. Martin was appointed president and CFO, becoming the first person outside the family to serve as president, while Kirkland B. Vashaw remained CEO.

In 2016, the Spangler Fulfillment Center moved into newly expanded space in the Spangler Candy warehouse, and Spangler celebrated the 50th anniversary of the Dum-Dums Drum Man with a large community mascot party. In 2018, Spangler Candy purchased the adjacent 20-acre facility owned by New Era Ohio LLC, providing additional warehouse space for future growth. On September 21 of that year, Spangler acquired the Necco Wafers, Sweethearts, and Canada Mints brands after the New England Confectionery Company declared bankruptcy. Spangler production of Necco Wafers resumed in May 2020, and Sweethearts relaunched for Valentine's Day 2021.

In 2020, the Bit-O-Honey brand was acquired from Pearson's Candy Company. Bit-O-Honey production began in Bryan, Ohio in January 2023. In 2022, Spangler Candy collaborated with the City of Bryan Municipal Utilities Department to paint eight 65-foot tall Dum-Dums on the community water tower located on the Spangler campus; the tower, painted by muralist Eric Henn, won the "Tank of the Year" and "People's Choice" awards. On June 9, 2023, a grand opening "wrapper-cutting" event was held in Bryan with approximately 1,000 people present. In December 2023, Spangler Candy World, an interactive museum, large-screen factory tour, and retail store, opened in downtown Bryan.
