= Dad's Place Church =

Non-denominational Christian church in Bryan, Ohio

Dad's Place
- Dad's Place
- 41°28′22″N 84°33′5″W
- Location: Bryan, Ohio, United States
- Country: United States
- Denomination: Non-denominational evangelical

History
- Status: Active

Architecture
- Functional status: Church; community outreach
- Completed: 2018

Clergy
- Pastor: Chris Avell

Dad's Place is a non-denominational evangelical Christian church in Bryan, Ohio. Founded in 2018 by Pastor Chris Avell, it operates a 24-hour outreach ministry that allows unhoused people to stay overnight in its building. The ministry led to a 2023–2025 legal dispute with the City of Bryan over zoning and fire-code compliance, which drew regional and national attention from outlets such as the Associated Press, The Guardian, and the Toledo Blade.

== History ==
Dad's Place opened in 2018 in downtown Bryan under Pastor Chris Avell. In March 2023, it began continuous 24/7 operations, providing a place to rest and short-term shelter for those in crisis, a decision that later prompted zoning and fire-safety challenges from the city.

== Ministry and outreach ==
The church conducts worship services and community programs focused on practical aid and inclusion. Since 2023, it has permitted overnight stays for unhoused individuals as part of what church leaders describe as their religious mission to serve the vulnerable. The ministry offers bedding, meals, and spiritual support. During litigation in 2024–2025, appellate stays allowed the church to continue overnight operations pending appeal.

== Legal disputes ==
=== Zoning and fire-safety enforcement ===
In late 2023, Bryan officials asserted that overnight sheltering conflicted with zoning rules for the downtown business district and raised fire-safety concerns such as the absence of a sprinkler system. On December 9, 2024, a county court enjoined overnight stays, but the Ohio Sixth District Court of Appeals issued an emergency stay that same week, allowing the ministry to continue. On January 3, 2025, the appeals court granted a full stay pending appeal, maintaining the status quo during further review.

=== Sixth District Court of Appeals ruling (2025) ===
On November 21, 2025, the Ohio Sixth District Court of Appeals reversed the trial court's December 5, 2024 preliminary injunction against Dad's Place and remanded the case for further proceedings. The appellate court held that the trial court applied the incorrect standard by using rational-basis review instead of strict scrutiny for the church's free-exercise claims. It determined that the applicable fire-code provisions were not "generally applicable" because enforcement involved individualized discretion by local fire officials, and it concluded that the church had demonstrated a substantial burden on its religious exercise. The court also found that the trial court failed to address the separate claim under the Ohio Constitution's Conscience Clause, which affords broader protections than the First Amendment. The case was remanded for reconsideration under strict-scrutiny requirements.

=== Williams County Court of Common Pleas ruling (2026) ===
On April 1, 2026, the Williams County Court of Common Pleas dismissed the City of Bryan’s civil case against Dad's Place, denying the request for a permanent injunction and entering judgment in favor of the church.

The ruling followed the Ohio Sixth District Court of Appeals’ 2025 decision requiring the case to be evaluated under strict scrutiny. Applying that standard, the court found that enforcement of fire-code provisions against the church’s overnight ministry did not satisfy constitutional requirements and declined to issue an injunction preventing the ministry from operating. The decision allowed Dad's Place to continue its overnight shelter activities while concluding the city’s civil enforcement action at the trial court level.

=== Criminal case against Pastor Avell ===
On January 21, 2025, Bryan Municipal Court found Pastor Avell guilty of a misdemeanor fire-code violation related to the overnight ministry, imposing a $200 fine and a 60-day suspended jail sentence. Sentencing was stayed pending appeal. On February 13, 2025, the appeals court stayed the sentence while the case continued.

=== Federal lawsuit and settlement ===
On January 22, 2024, Dad's Place filed a federal civil action alleging that the city's enforcement burdened the church's free exercise of religion. Coverage by FOX's LiveNOW described the case as part of a broader discussion about faith-based sheltering and local ordinances. In September 2025, the federal case was dismissed by agreement. The church agreed to apply for zoning permissions, and the city paused enforcement while appeals continued. Local reports in September 2025 noted that related state appeals remained active.

== Reception and coverage ==
Media coverage described the case as a test of the boundary between public-safety enforcement and religiously motivated service. City officials emphasized compliance with fire codes, while the church framed its actions as an expression of compassion and faith. Coverage appeared in national outlets including the Associated Press, The Guardian, FOX's LiveNOW, and regional media such as the Toledo Blade and WTOL-11.

== See also ==
- Religious Land Use and Institutionalized Persons Act
- Zoning in the United States
- Homelessness in the United States
