= Isoamyl acetate =

Chemical compound with banana odor

- Isoamyl acetate

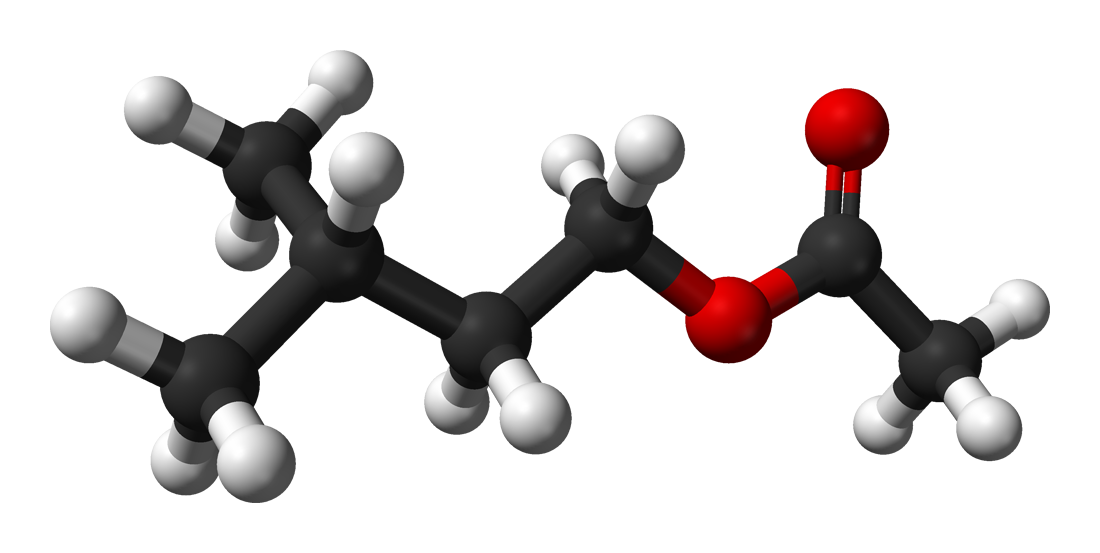

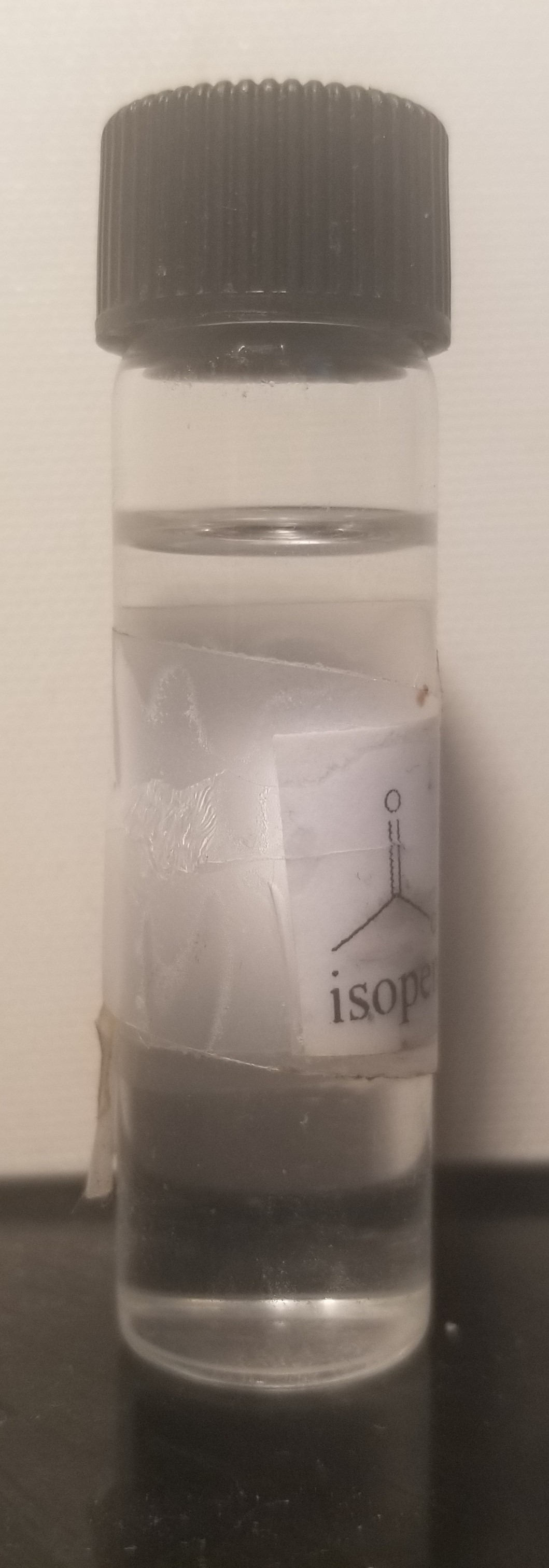

Names
- Preferred IUPAC name 3-Methylbutyl acetate
- Systematic IUPAC name 3-Methylbutyl ethanoate
- Other names Isopentyl acetate Isopentyl ethanoate Banana oil Pear essence

Identifiers
CAS Number	123-92-2
3D model (JSmol)	Interactive image
Beilstein Reference	1744750
ChEBI	CHEBI:31725
ChEMBL	ChEMBL42013
ChemSpider	29016
ECHA InfoCard	100.004.240
EC Number	204-662-3
Gmelin Reference	101452
KEGG	C12296
PubChem CID	31276
RTECS number	NS9800000
UNII	Z135787824
UN number	1104 1993
CompTox Dashboard (EPA)	DTXSID9025453
- InChI: InChI=1S/C7H14O2/c1-6(2)4-5-9-7(3)8/h6H,4-5H2,1-3H3 Key: MLFHJEHSLIIPHL-UHFFFAOYSA-N; InChI=1/C7H14O2/c1-6(2)4-5-9-7(3)8/h6H,4-5H2,1-3H3 Key: MLFHJEHSLIIPHL-UHFFFAOYAI
- SMILES: O=C(OCCC(C)C)C

Properties
Chemical formula	C_{7}H_{14}O_{2}
Molar mass	130.187 g·mol^{−1}
Appearance	Colorless liquid
Odor	Banana-like
Density	0.876 g/cm^{3}
Melting point	−78 °C (−108 °F; 195 K)
Boiling point	142 °C (288 °F; 415 K)
Solubility in water	0.3% (20 °C)
Vapor pressure	4 mmHg or 0.533 kPa (20 °C)
Magnetic susceptibility (χ)	−89.4·10^{−6} cm^{3}/mol
Refractive index (n_{D})	1.4020 at 20°

Hazards
- GHS labelling
Pictograms	(GHS02: Flammable)
Signal word	Danger
Hazard statements	H226, H315, H319, H335, H336, H372
Precautionary statements	P210, P233, P240, P241, P242, P243, P260, P264, P270, P271, P280, P302+P352, P303+P361+P353, P304+P340, P305+P351+P338, P312, P314, P321, P332+P313, P337+P313, P362, P370+P378, P403+P233, P403+P235, P405, P501
NFPA 704 (fire diamond)	1 3 0
Flash point	25 °C (77 °F; 298 K)
Explosive limits	1.0% (100 °C) – 7.5%
- Lethal dose or concentration (LD, LC)
LD_{50} (median dose)	7422 mg/kg (rabbit, oral); 16,600 mg/kg (rat, oral)
LC_{Lo} (lowest published)	6470 ppm (cat)
- NIOSH (US health exposure limits)
PEL (Permissible)	TWA 100 ppm (525 mg/m^{3})
REL (Recommended)	TWA 100 ppm (525 mg/m^{3})
IDLH (Immediate danger)	1000 ppm

Related compounds
Related compounds	Isoamyl formate
- Except where otherwise noted, data are given for materials in their standard state (at 25 °C [77 °F], 100 kPa). verify (what is ?) Infobox references

Isoamyl acetate, also known as isopentyl acetate, is an ester formed from isoamyl alcohol and acetic acid, with the molecular formula C_{7}H_{14}O_{2}. It is a colorless liquid that is only slightly soluble in water, but very soluble in most organic solvents. Isoamyl acetate has a strong odor which is described as similar to both banana and pear. Pure isoamyl acetate, or mixtures of isoamyl acetate, amyl acetate, and other flavors in ethanol may be referred to as banana oil or pear oil.

== Natural occurrence ==
Isoamyl acetate occurs naturally in many plants, including apple, banana, coffee, grape, guava, lychee, papaya, peach, pomegranate, and tomato. It is also released by fermentation processes, including those used for making beer, sake, cognac, and whisky.

Isoamyl acetate is released by a honey bee's sting apparatus where it serves as a pheromone beacon to attract other bees and provoke them to sting.

== Production ==
Isoamyl acetate is prepared by the acid-catalyzed reaction (Fischer esterification) between isoamyl alcohol and glacial acetic acid as shown in the reaction equation below. Typically, sulfuric acid is used as the catalyst. Alternatively, p-toluenesulfonic acid or an acidic ion exchange resin can be used as the catalyst.

It is also produced synthetically by the rectification of amyl acetate.

== Applications ==
Isoamyl acetate is used to confer banana or pear flavor in foods such as circus peanuts, Juicy Fruit and pear drops. It was first commercialized in pear drops introduced at the 1851 Crystal Palace exhibition in London, which were marketed as tasting like Jargonelle pears. By the 1860s, it had been introduced in the United States as banana flavoring, since Jargonelle pears were uncommon there. This occurred approximately a decade before real bananas became commercially available in the country in 1876.

Banana oil and pear oil commonly refer to a solution of isoamyl acetate in ethanol that is used as an artificial flavor.

It is also used as a solvent for some varnishes, oil paints, and nitrocellulose lacquers. As a solvent and carrier for materials such as nitrocellulose, it was extensively used in the aircraft industry for stiffening and wind-proofing fabric flying surfaces, where it and its derivatives were generally known as 'aircraft dope'. Now that most aircraft wings are made of metal, such use is mostly limited to historically accurate reproductions and scale models.

Because of its intense, pleasant odor and its low toxicity, isoamyl acetate is used to test the effectiveness of respirators or gas masks.
