= J. O. Kinnaman =

John Ora Kinnaman (February 23, 1877 – September 7, 1961), known as J. O. Kinnaman, was an American biblical scholar and biblical archaeologist.

== Career ==
Born in Bryan, Ohio, Kinnaman graduated from Tri-State College, Indiana in 1894, and received his PhD in archeology from the University of Rome in 1907. He then accepted a teaching position at Benton Harbor College, where he would be later be made Dean.

== Near-East Archeology ==
Kinnaman was one of the 20 people to be on the expedition led by Howard Carter that discovered the tomb of Tutankhamun in 1922, and the last remaining survivor of the expedition. He would later pursue the field of Near-East archeology, where he served as the Member of the Palestinian Exploration Fund of Great Britain, Vice President of the Society for the Study of the Apocrypha of Great Britain, Life Member of the Society of International Archeologists, Editor-in-Chief of The American Antiquarian and Oriental Journal, and Editor of The Bible Digest.

== Publication ==
He published 4 books on biblical archaeology, including his 1940 book, Diggers for Facts, where he compared the archaeological scene of the 1940s to the works of ancient texts, where he argued strongly for the historical Exodus, dating it at 1486 BC, the Resurrection of Jesus, as well as the account of Daniel in the Den of Lions, which he strongly defends particularly on page 140, where he writes:

"Dr. Dieulafoy, one of the archaeologists, was working one day with a rather large stone in the surface of the ground. The stone was stubborn and refused to yield to the efforts of the man. Suddenly it gave away, and Dr. Dieulafoy disappeared. His co-workers found him scared but not hurt at the bottom of what appeared to be an ancient dry well. When the site was completely cleared, the well proved to be one of the open cages for lions in the zoological gardens, and on the base of the cage was found the following inscription:

'The place of execution where men who angered the king died torn by wild beasts.' (lions).

The adverse critic assures us that there were no lions' dens, nor lions in the city of Babylon; but there it is. What are the critics going to say now?"

== Death ==
Kinnaman died on September 7, 1961, at the age of 84 in Stockton, California. He was survived by his wife, Flo Vera.

== Bibliography ==
Kinnaman, J.O. (1940). Diggers for Facts. Destiny.
