= WQCT =

- Bryan, Ohio; United States
- Frequency: 1520 kHz
- Branding: The Q 96.5

Programming
- Format: Classic hits
- Affiliations: ABC Radio; Dial Global; Kool Gold Timeless Classics; Agri Broadcast Network; Ohio State Sports Network

Ownership
- Owner: Impact Radio, LLC
- Sister stations: WBNO-FM

History
- First air date: 1962

Technical information
- Licensing authority: FCC
- Facility ID: 72784
- Class: D
- Power: 500 watts day 250 watts critical hours 5 watts night
- Transmitter coordinates: 41°28′40.2″N 84°34′41.8″W
- Translator: 96.5 W243DP (Bryan)

Links
- Public license information: Public file; LMS
- Webcast: Listen live
- Website: wbnowqct.com

WQCT (1520 AM) is a radio station broadcasting a classic hits format. Licensed to Bryan, Ohio, United States, the station is currently owned by Impact Radio, LLC and features programming from ABC Radio and Westwood One.
