= WBNO-FM =

- Bryan, Ohio; United States
- Frequency: 100.9 MHz
- Branding: B-Rock 100.9

Programming
- Format: Classic rock
- Affiliations: Agri Broadcast Network; ABC Radio; Cleveland Guardians Radio Network; Dial Global; Ohio State Sports Network

Ownership
- Owner: Impact Radio, LLC
- Sister stations: WQCT

History
- First air date: 1966

Technical information
- Facility ID: 72782
- Class: A
- ERP: 6,000 watts
- HAAT: 91 meters (299 ft)
- Transmitter coordinates: 41°28′44.00″N 84°34′50.00″W

Links
- Webcast: Listen live
- Website: WBNO Online

WBNO-FM (100.9 FM) is a radio station licensed to Bryan, Ohio, United States. The station is currently owned by Impact Radio, LLC. WBNO-FM broadcasts a classic rock music format, switching from adult contemporary during the summer of 2013.

WBNO had carried the Classic Hits format from Dial Global until that format was discontinued on June 17, 2012.

On May 24, 2025 the station, along with its sister station WQCT went silent due to a fire at their studio/transmitter building.

== Previous logo ==
This was the previous logo:
