= Chris Avell =

American pastor

- Occupations: Pastor, community ministry leader
- Known for: Founder of Dad's Place Church and 24/7 outreach in Bryan, Ohio

Chris Avell is an American pastor and community leader based in Bryan, Ohio. He is best known as the founder and senior pastor of Dad's Place Church, which operates a 24/7 outreach ministry permitting overnight stays for unhoused persons. His pastoral and social work became subject to national scrutiny following a protracted legal dispute between the church and the City of Bryan from 2023 to 2025 over zoning, fire-code compliance, and religious-freedom claims.

== Early life and ministry ==
Avell has publicly stated that he was an atheist until 2009, when he converted to Christianity after attending services at New Hope Community Church in Bryan, Ohio. He later joined the church’s leadership in local outreach activities, describing his conversion as the beginning of his commitment to share his faith with others.

According to a 2018 report in the Bryan Times, Avell and his wife Lisa have five children. Before founding Dad’s Place, Avell worked in marketing and web development, according to early ministry partners.

In March 2023, Avell and his church launched the 24/7 program at Dad’s Place, opening the facility overnight to people in crisis who lacked housing or overnight shelter options. This decision was made in response to demand exceeding capacity at local shelters.

== Legal disputes and public profile ==
During 2023–2025, Avell became publicly known for the legal disputes surrounding his ministry.

=== Dropped charges and federal suit ===
Following the church’s expansion to 24/7 outreach, the City of Bryan initially filed multiple code and zoning-violation charges against Avell and Dad's Place Church. In February 2024, the city dismissed all those earlier criminal charges as part of settlement talks. On January 22, 2024, the church and Avell filed a federal civil lawsuit against the City of Bryan, alleging that enforcement actions burdened Avell’s religious exercise.

=== Conviction and sentence stay ===
On January 21, 2025, Avell was found guilty in Bryan Municipal Court of a misdemeanor fire-code violation related to the church’s overnight use. He was fined $200 and given a 60-day suspended jail sentence, which the court stayed to allow appeal.

In February 2025, a state appeals court stayed the sentence pending appeal.

=== Dismissal of federal case and ongoing appeals ===
In September 2025, the federal lawsuit filed by Avell and Dad’s Place was dismissed by mutual agreement. Under the agreement, the church would seek required permits and the city would pause certain enforcement pending resolution of state appeals.

Meanwhile, appeals involving Bryan’s zoning and fire-code decisions, and Avell’s criminal conviction, continued in Ohio’s Sixth District Court of Appeals.

== Reception and impact ==
Avell’s actions have drawn regional and national attention to the intersection of religious freedom, social ministry, and municipal regulation. His case is frequently cited in commentary on how local governments interact with faith-based organizations offering shelter and services.
