= Bryan, Ohio =

- City
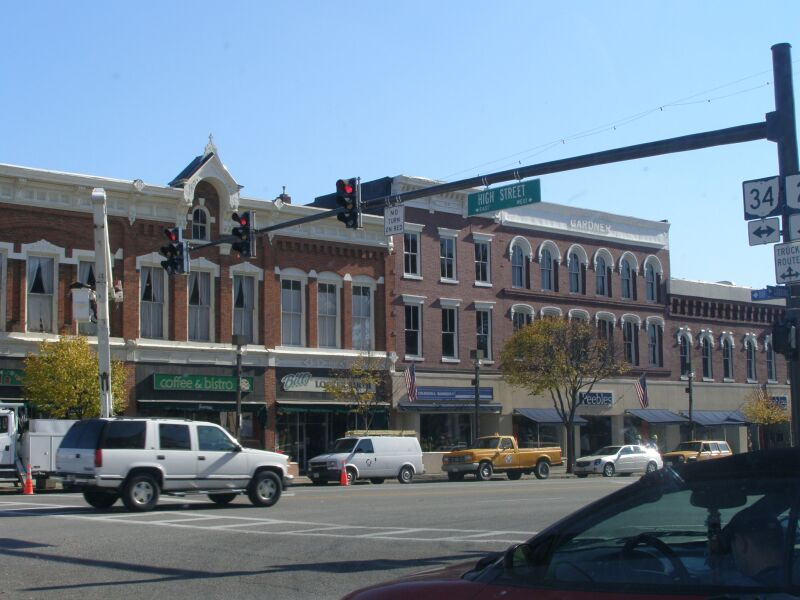
- Eastern side of the courthouse square

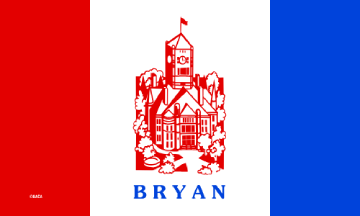
- Flag
- Nickname: The Fountain City
- Interactive map of Bryan, Ohio
- Location within Ohio Location within the United States
- Coordinates: 41°28′13″N 84°31′27″W
- Country: United States
- State: Ohio
- County: Williams
- Founded: 1840
- Incorporated: 1841 (village); 1941 (city)
- Named for: John A. Bryan

Government
  - Mayor: Carrie Schlade

Area
  - Total: 5.43 sq mi (14.07 km^{2})
  - Land: 5.40 sq mi (13.99 km^{2})
  - Water: 0.031 sq mi (0.08 km^{2})
- Elevation: 751 ft (229 m)

Population (2020)
  - Total: 8,729
  - Estimate (2023): 8,609
  - Density: 1,616/sq mi (623.9/km^{2})
- Time zone: UTC-5 (Eastern (EST))
  - Summer (DST): UTC-4 (EDT)
- ZIP code: 43506
- Area code(s): 419, 567
- FIPS code: 39-09792
- GNIS feature ID: 1087167
- Website: www.cityofbryan.com

Bryan is a city in, and the county seat of, Williams County, Ohio, United States. It is located in the state's northwestern corner, 53 miles (85 km) southwest of Toledo. The population was 8,729 at the 2020 census.

== History ==
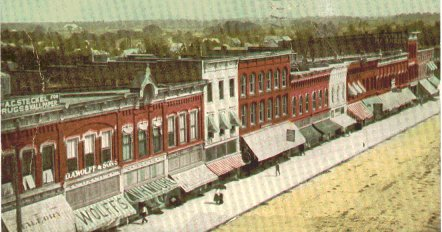
Bryan, Ohio, The East Side, 1910 or before

Bryan was platted in 1840 by John A. Bryan, and named for him. It was incorporated as a village in 1841, and reincorporated as a city in 1941.

Williams County was originally part of Defiance County, with Defiance as the county seat. The area was later split into Williams and Defiance counties. Bryan was named the seat for the new county, but not without conflict; the village of Montpelier was considered a more centralized location. The people of Montpelier petitioned the state legislature, but in the end Bryan was named county seat because of its greater industrial and commercial importance and because of its higher population. To this day, many people still argue about the state's decision and a rivalry of sorts remains between the two communities.

A strip of Williams County north of Bryan was originally part of a conflict known as the Toledo War, between Ohio and Michigan. Both states claimed the land, the Toledo Strip, which was named for the port city of Toledo at its eastern end. The conflict was eventually resolved in favor of Ohio, with Michigan being compensated with what is now the western Upper Peninsula.

The Williams County Courthouse downtown was completed in 1891. It is the third courthouse to occupy the property.

The Lake Shore and Michigan Southern Railway, later absorbed into the New York Central Railroad as part of its Chicago mainline, began serving Bryan in 1869. Due to the New York Central's line between Stryker, Ohio and Butler, Indiana, being both straight and flat, on July 23, 1966, Bryan was a mid-point of a record-setting speed run by a New York Central RDC-3, M-497 Black Beetle, modified with a pair of jet engines. The car reached a speed of 183.68 mph (295.6 km/h), an American rail speed record that still stands today. From 1905 to 1939, Bryan was also the western terminus for the Toledo and Indiana Railway, an interurban that began operation between Toledo and Stryker in 1901.

== Geography ==
According to the United States Census Bureau, the city has a total area of 5.56 square miles (14.40 km^{2}), of which 5.53 square miles (14.32 km^{2}) is land and 0.03 square miles (0.08 km^{2}) is water.

=== Climate ===
Within the Köppen Climate Classification system, Bryan has a hot-summer humid continental climate, abbreviated "Dfa" on climate maps. The hottest temperature recorded in Bryan was 106 °F (41.1 °C) on June 29, 2012. The coldest temperature recorded was −20 °F (−28.9 °C) on January 16, 2009.

Climate data for Bryan, Ohio, 1991–2020 normals, extremes 2006–present
Month	Jan	Feb	Mar	Apr	May	Jun	Jul	Aug	Sep	Oct	Nov	Dec	Year
Record high °F (°C)	65 (18)	70 (21)	85 (29)	85 (29)	96 (36)	106 (41)	104 (40)	96 (36)	99 (37)	90 (32)	79 (26)	67 (19)	106 (41)
Mean daily maximum °F (°C)	32.2 (0.1)	35.7 (2.1)	46.2 (7.9)	59.7 (15.4)	71.3 (21.8)	80.8 (27.1)	84.7 (29.3)	82.3 (27.9)	76.4 (24.7)	63.7 (17.6)	48.8 (9.3)	37.5 (3.1)	59.9 (15.5)
Daily mean °F (°C)	24.4 (−4.2)	26.7 (−2.9)	36.8 (2.7)	48.2 (9.0)	60.2 (15.7)	69.9 (21.1)	73.5 (23.1)	71.1 (21.7)	64.3 (17.9)	52.3 (11.3)	39.5 (4.2)	30.0 (−1.1)	49.7 (9.9)
Mean daily minimum °F (°C)	16.6 (−8.6)	17.7 (−7.9)	27.3 (−2.6)	36.8 (2.7)	49.2 (9.6)	58.9 (14.9)	62.4 (16.9)	59.9 (15.5)	52.1 (11.2)	40.8 (4.9)	30.2 (−1.0)	22.5 (−5.3)	39.5 (4.2)
Record low °F (°C)	−20 (−29)	−15 (−26)	−8 (−22)	17 (−8)	27 (−3)	43 (6)	46 (8)	45 (7)	32 (0)	23 (−5)	4 (−16)	−11 (−24)	−20 (−29)
Average precipitation inches (mm)	2.48 (63)	2.16 (55)	2.75 (70)	3.73 (95)	4.04 (103)	3.96 (101)	3.94 (100)	3.25 (83)	3.29 (84)	2.61 (66)	2.93 (74)	2.24 (57)	37.38 (951)
Average precipitation days (≥ 0.01 in)	13.0	12.4	11.0	13.3	13.0	11.0	9.0	9.7	9.5	12.9	10.6	12.2	137.6
Source 1: NOAA
Source 2: National Weather Service

== Demographics ==
Historical population
Census	Pop.	Note	%±
1860	1,064		—
1870	2,284		114.7%
1880	2,952		29.2%
1890	3,068		3.9%
1900	3,131		2.1%
1910	3,641		16.3%
1920	4,252		16.8%
1930	4,689		10.3%
1940	5,404		15.2%
1950	6,365		17.8%
1960	7,361		15.6%
1970	7,008		−4.8%
1980	7,880		12.4%
1990	8,348		5.9%
2000	8,333		−0.2%
2010	8,545		2.5%
2020	8,729		2.2%
2023 (est.)	8,609		−1.4%

=== 2020 census ===
As of the 2020 census, Bryan had a population of 8,729. The median age was 41.1 years, with 21.8% of residents under the age of 18 and 20.6% aged 65 years or older. For every 100 females there were 92.1 males, and for every 100 females age 18 and over there were 87.7 males age 18 and over.

There were 3,879 households in Bryan, of which 25.6% had children under the age of 18 living in them. Of all households, 37.1% were married-couple households, 21.1% were households with a male householder and no spouse or partner present, and 33.2% were households with a female householder and no spouse or partner present. About 37.1% of all households were made up of individuals and 16.2% had someone living alone who was 65 years of age or older.

There were 4,133 housing units, of which 6.1% were vacant. Among occupied housing units, 60.5% were owner-occupied and 39.5% were renter-occupied. The homeowner vacancy rate was 1.4% and the rental vacancy rate was 3.3%.

99.2% of residents lived in urban areas, while 0.8% lived in rural areas.

Racial composition as of the 2020 census
Race	Number	Percent
White	7,897	90.5%
Black or African American	54	0.6%
American Indian and Alaska Native	31	0.4%
Asian	88	1.0%
Native Hawaiian and Other Pacific Islander	4	<0.1%
Some other race	175	2.0%
Two or more races	480	5.5%
Hispanic or Latino (of any race)	562	6.4%

=== 2010 census ===
As of the census of 2010, there were 8,545 people, 3,761 households, and 2,214 families residing in the city. The population density was 1,545.2 inhabitants per square mile (596.6/km^{2}). There were 4,087 housing units at an average density of 739.1 per square mile (285.4/km^{2}). The racial makeup of the city was 94.3% White, 0.6% African American, 0.2% Native American, 0.9% Asian, 0.1% Pacific Islander, 2.1% from other races, and 2.0% from two or more races. Hispanic or Latino of any race were 5.1% of the population.

There were 3,761 households, of which 29.4% had children under the age of 18 living with them, 40.8% were married couples living together, 12.7% had a female householder with no husband present, 5.4% had a male householder with no wife present, and 41.1% were non-families. 34.9% of all households were made up of individuals, and 14.1% had someone living alone who was 65 years of age or older. The average household size was 2.24 and the average family size was 2.86.

The median age in the city was 39.7 years. 23.6% of residents were under the age of 18; 8.1% were between the ages of 18 and 24; 24.8% were from 25 to 44; 26.7% were from 45 to 64; and 16.8% were 65 years of age or older. The gender makeup of the city was 47.5% male and 52.5% female.

=== 2000 census ===
As of the census of 2000, there were 8,333 people, 3,528 households, and 2,155 families residing in the city. The population density was 1,821.7 inhabitants per square mile (703.4/km^{2}). There were 3,733 housing units at an average density of 816.1 per square mile (315.1/km^{2}). The racial makeup of the city was 96.23% White, 0.31% African American, 0.23% Native American, 0.71% Asian, 1.40% from other races, and 1.12% from two or more races. Hispanic or Latino of any race were 3.73% of the population.

There were 3,528 households, out of which 29.7% had children under the age of 18 living with them, 45.7% were married couples living together, 11.4% had a female householder with no husband present, and 38.9% were non-families. 32.9% of all households were made up of individuals, and 13.7% had someone living alone who was 65 years of age or older. The average household size was 2.31 and the average family size was 2.94.

In the city, the population was spread out, with 24.8% under the age of 18, 8.4% from 18 to 24, 28.7% from 25 to 44, 22.0% from 45 to 64, and 16.1% who were 65 years of age or older. The median age was 37 years. For every 100 females, there were 90.6 males. For every 100 females age 18 and over, there were 84.2 males.

The median income for a household in the city was $36,978, and the median income for a family was $45,965. Males had a median income of $34,641 versus $22,434 for females. The per capita income for the city was $20,069. About 3.9% of families and 6.0% of the population were below the poverty line, including 5.1% of those under age 18 and 5.9% of those age 65 or over.

== Economy ==
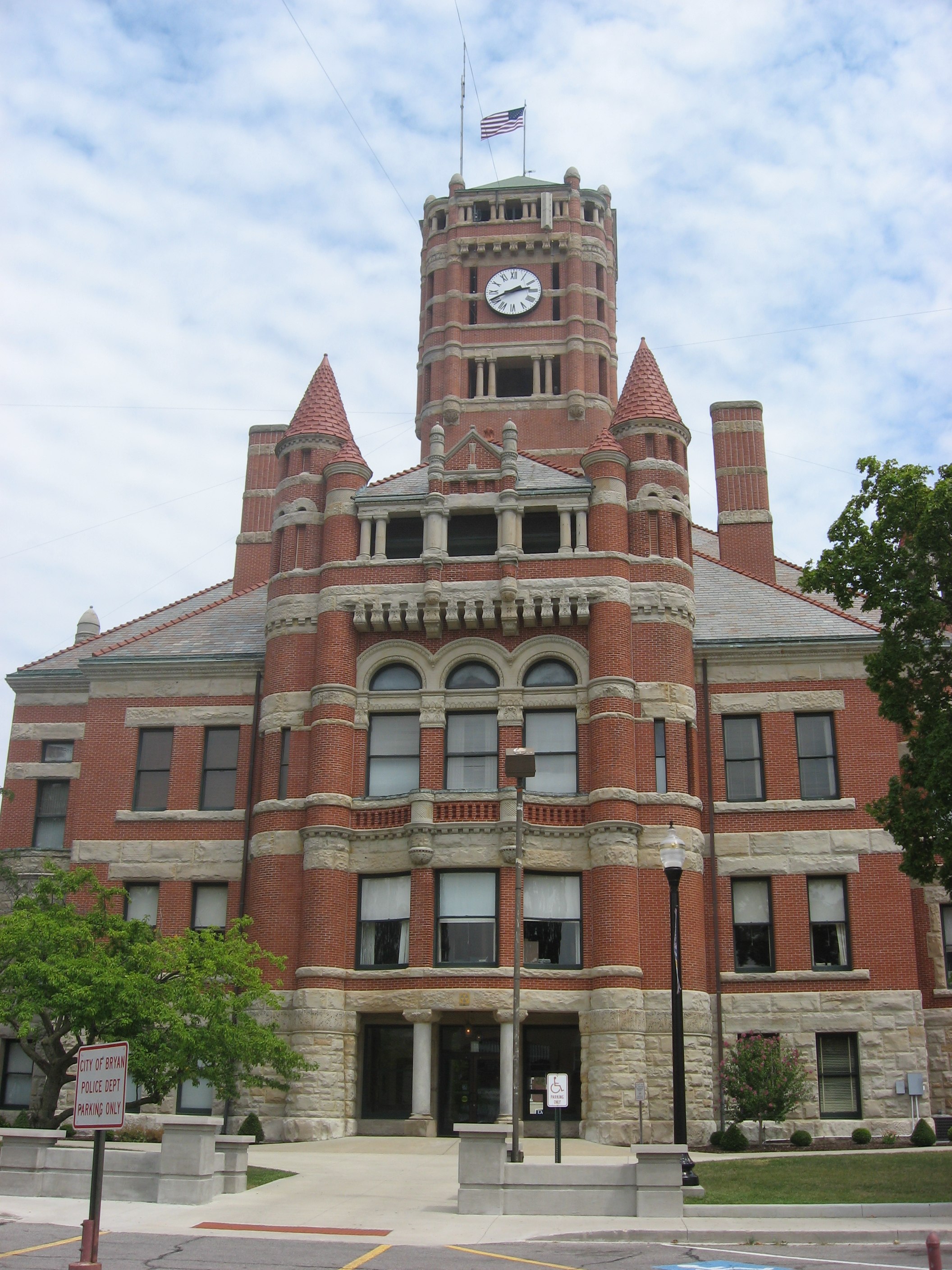
Williams County Courthouse

Bryan's manufacturers produce a diversity of items. However, it is best known for products made by two companies headquartered in the city. Dum Dum lollipops, Saf-T-Pops and Marshmallow Circus Peanuts are made by Spangler Candy Company (the largest producer of candy canes in the world), and the Etch A Sketch (now manufactured in China) was developed by the Ohio Art Company. Allied Moulded Products, premier manufacturer of electrical enclosures, has been located in Bryan for 60 years. The city is also home to Titan Tire Corporation, makers of Goodyear- and Titan-brand off-road tires. In 2005 Sun Pharmaceutical purchased a plant specializing in generic medications from former operator Valeant Pharmaceuticals. The plant was sold to Kansas City, Missouri-based Nostrum Laboratories in December 2015.

== Education ==
Bryan City School District operates Bryan Public Elementary School and Bryan Middle/High School.

St. Patrick's Catholic School, a combined church and PreK - 6th grade school, also serves local residents.

Bryan has a public library, a branch of the Williams County Public Library.

== Media ==
WQCT-AM, which plays oldies, WBNO-FM, which plays classic hits, and WLZZ-FM in nearby Montpelier, which plays country music, are the local commercial radio stations. Another radio station licensed to Bryan is WGBE-FM, a simulcast of classical music/National Public Radio station WGTE-FM in Toledo.

== Infrastructure ==
=== Transportation ===
Bryan is served by Amtrak's Lake Shore Limited service at an unstaffed station along the former New York Central line. Norfolk Southern Railway operates the line for high-volume freight service passing through Bryan between the east and Chicago.

The city is served by U.S. Route 6 (US 6), US 127, State Route 2 (SR 2), SR 15, and SR 34. SR 15 connects to the Ohio Turnpike, which passes to the north of Bryan.

The Williams County Airport is located two nautical miles (2.3 mi; 3.7 km) east of Bryan's central business district.

== Notable people ==
- Chris Avell, pastor of Dad's Place Church
- Chris Carpenter, professional baseball pitcher
- Richard Cramer, actor
- Steve Fireovid, professional baseball pitcher
- Ned Garver, professional baseball pitcher
- Dr. Margaret Goodell, stem cell scientist and professor at Baylor College of Medicine
- Bob Hartman, guitarist and founder of the pioneer Christian rock band Petra
- Terence T. Henricks, astronaut
- William Isaac, chairman of the Federal Deposit Insurance Corporation from 1981 to 1985
- J.O. Kinnaman, biblical scholar and archaeologist
- Horace Prettyman, the first Ohioan to play football for the University of Michigan
- Richard Schreder, sailplane designer and pilot
- Mark Winegardner, author, professor at Florida State University
- Matt Wisler, professional baseball pitcher
