= Bulk confectionery =

Confectionery sold loose by retailers

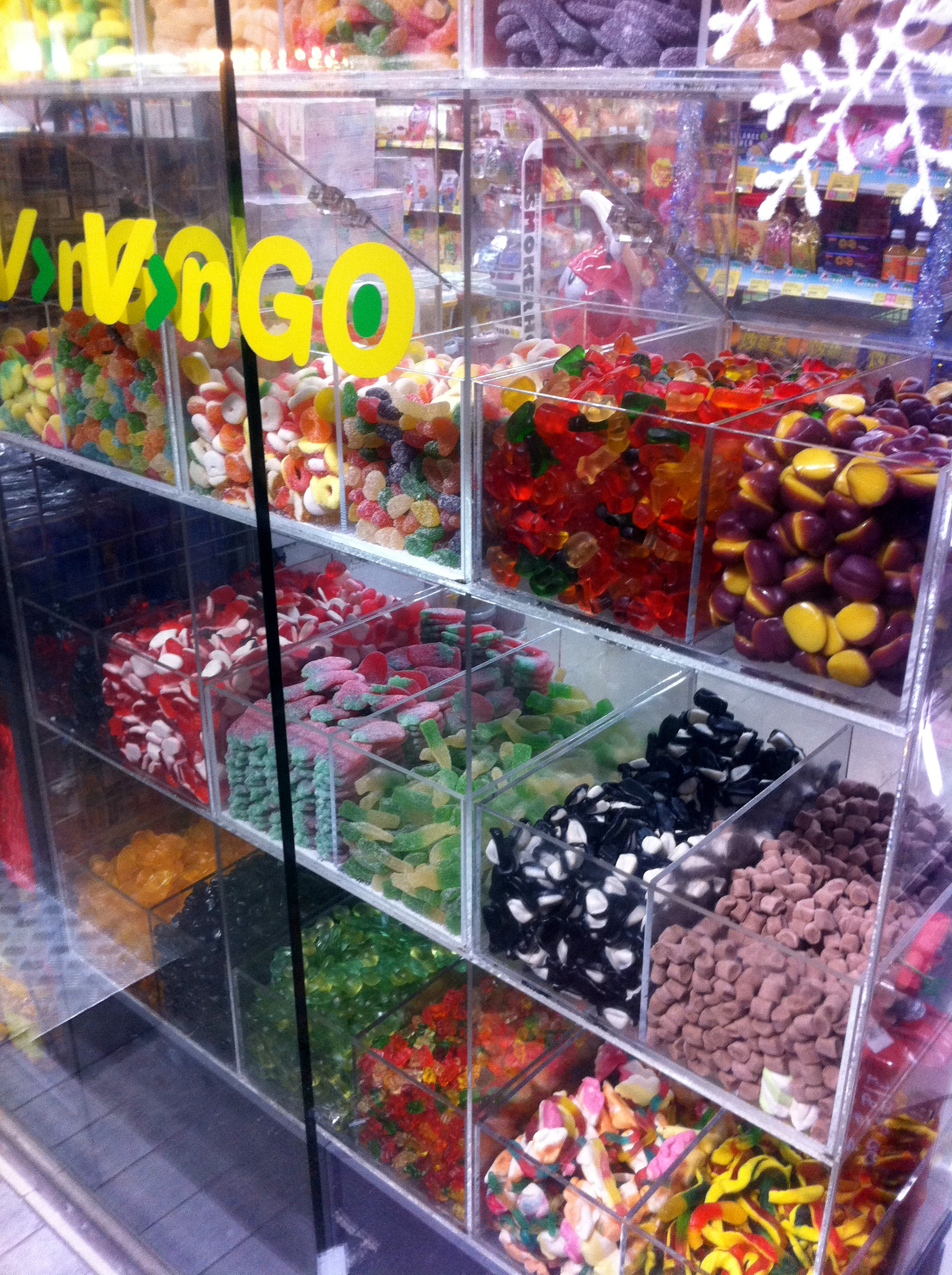
A pick and mix candy display in Hong Kong.

Bulk confectionery, pick and mix candy, candy walls, or simply loose candy is a retailing strategy where various types of confectionery are sold together in large containers or in separate bins, allowing customers to select the assortment and quantity they prefer. Typically used in vending machines or confectionery retailers, this method involves dispensing candy by weight or piece count. This method has a global presence, with variations in practice and terminology across regions.

== History ==
=== Sweden ===
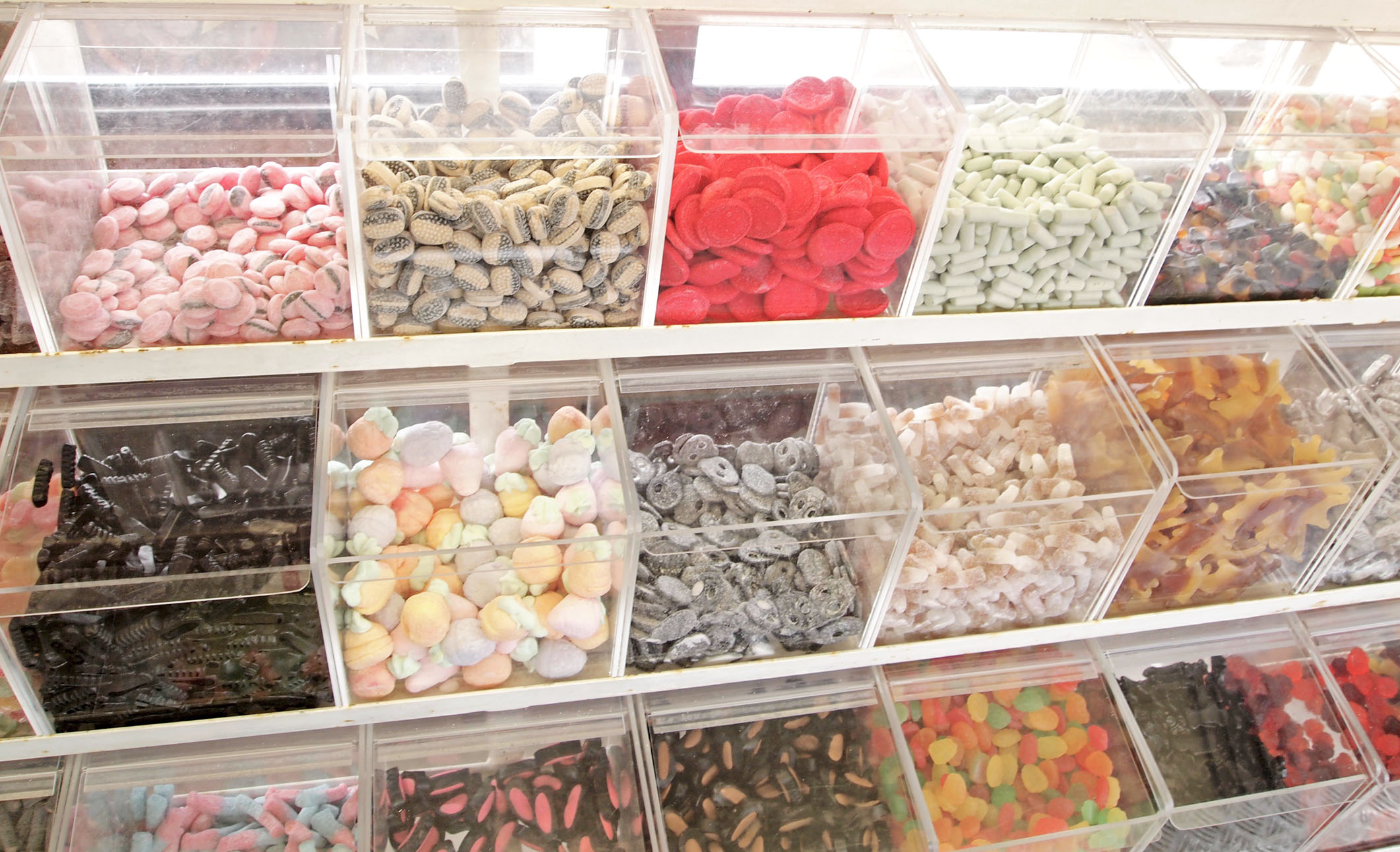
Swedish pick and mix candy bins in a store

Bulk confectionery (Swedish: lösgodis) dates back to the 1930s, when Swedish agriculture became self sufficient in refined sugar. That made sugar cheap, and candies accessible to almost the entire population. In 1984, the Swedish National Food Agency (Livsmedelsverket) approved selling it in ordinary larger stores, provided that the candy varieties are kept in separate containers and picked with a scoop or a smaller bucket. The widespread availability of bulk confectionery is the main reason Sweden has the highest candy consumption in the world.

Self-serve loose candy walls were introduced by three Finnish students educated in Stockholm, Sweden. They developed the idea in Helsinki, Finland, in the early 1980s. Since then it has started to spread all around the world, mostly in Europe and Asia. Even some IKEA stores in North America have started to sell mostly Swedish varieties but also American classics.

Sweden had the highest per capita candy consumption in the world since at least 2009. Maundy Thursday is the biggest selling day in grocery stores. In Sweden, about 18 kilograms (40 lb) of candy are consumed per person per year (as of 2014).

=== United States ===
The first penny candy to be sold in the United States was the Tootsie Roll, in 1907, followed by Necco Wafers and Hershey's Kisses in subsequent decades. Bulk-sale of candy in the 20th century US was mainly through the F.W. Woolworth Company’s five and dime store chain, which closed in the 1990s, marking an end in popularity of the phenomenon.

== Gallery ==
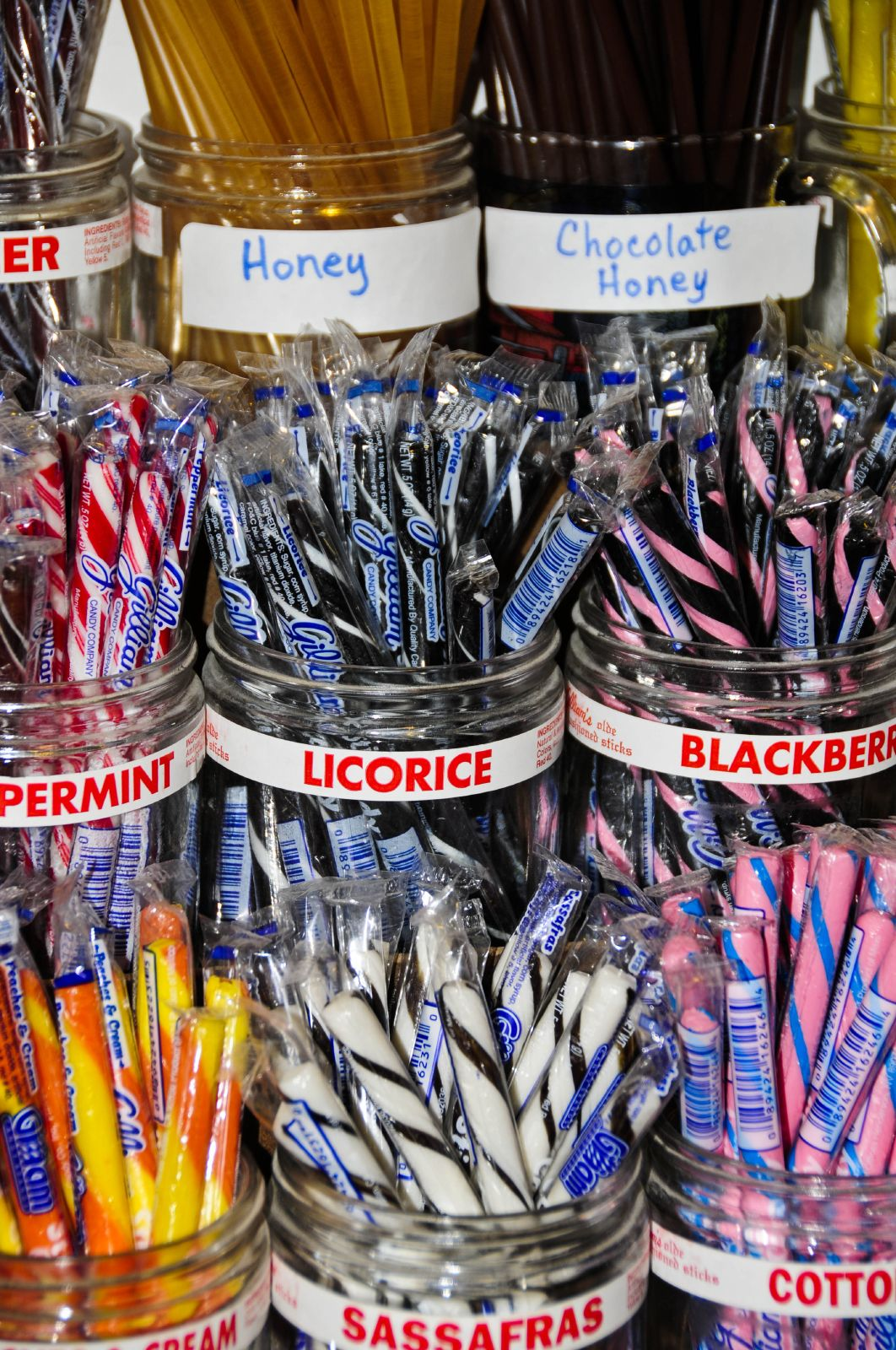
Peppermint and other candy sticks

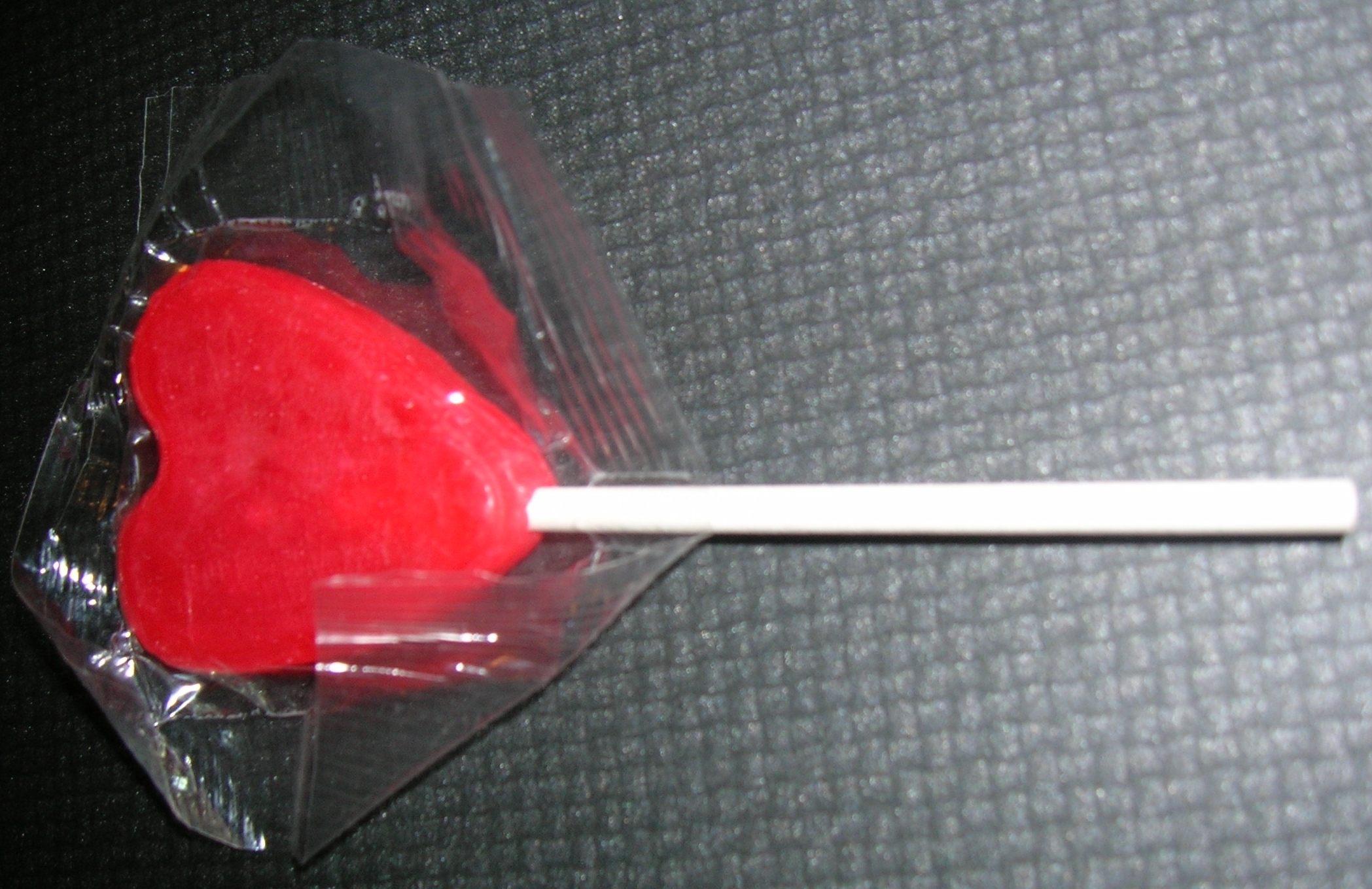
A lollipop

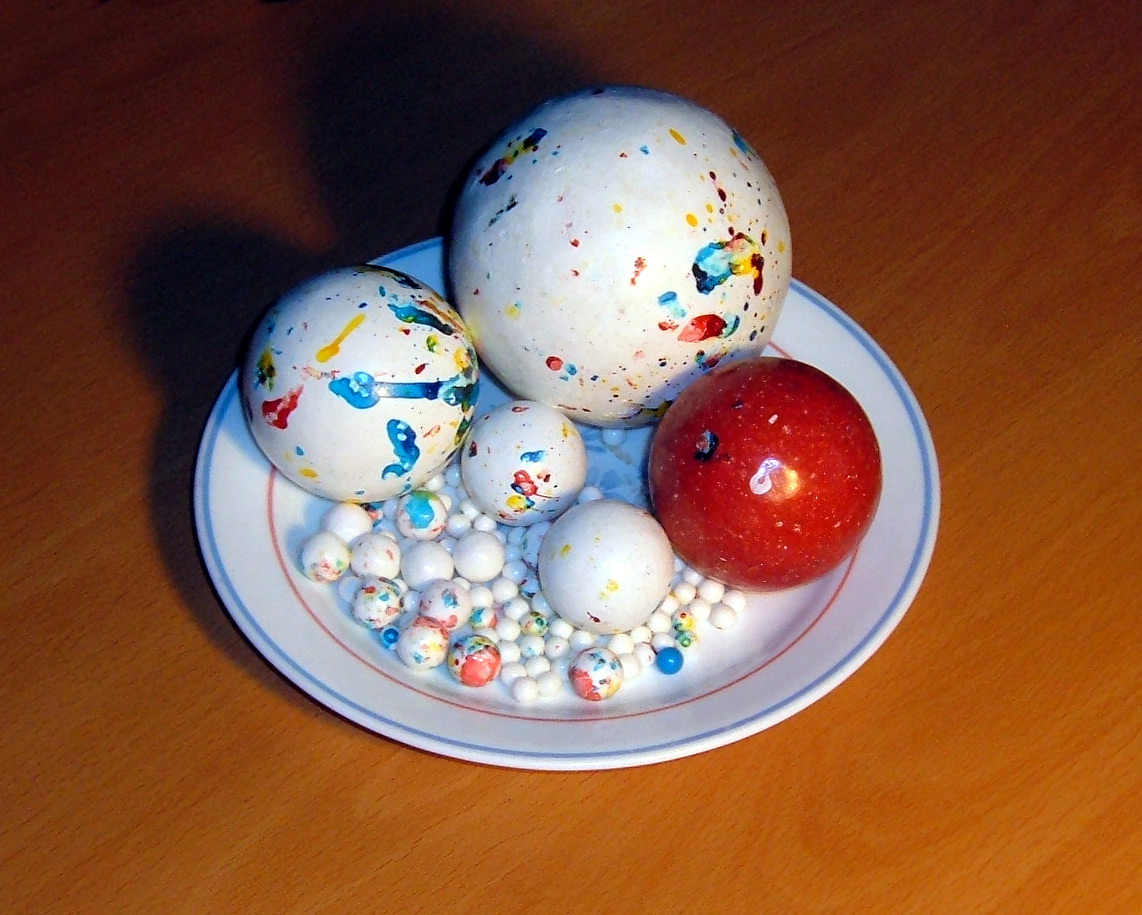
A plate of gobstoppers in various sizes

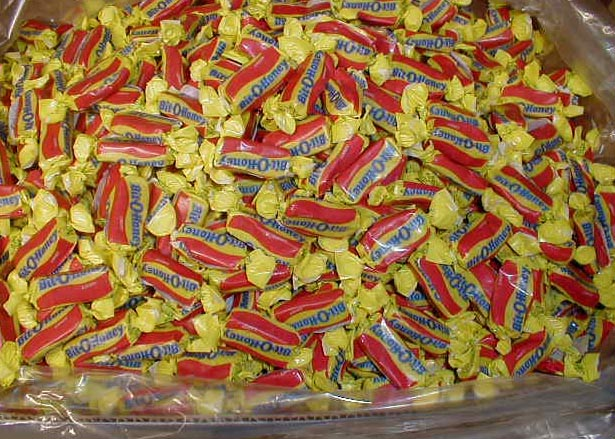
Bit-o-Honey

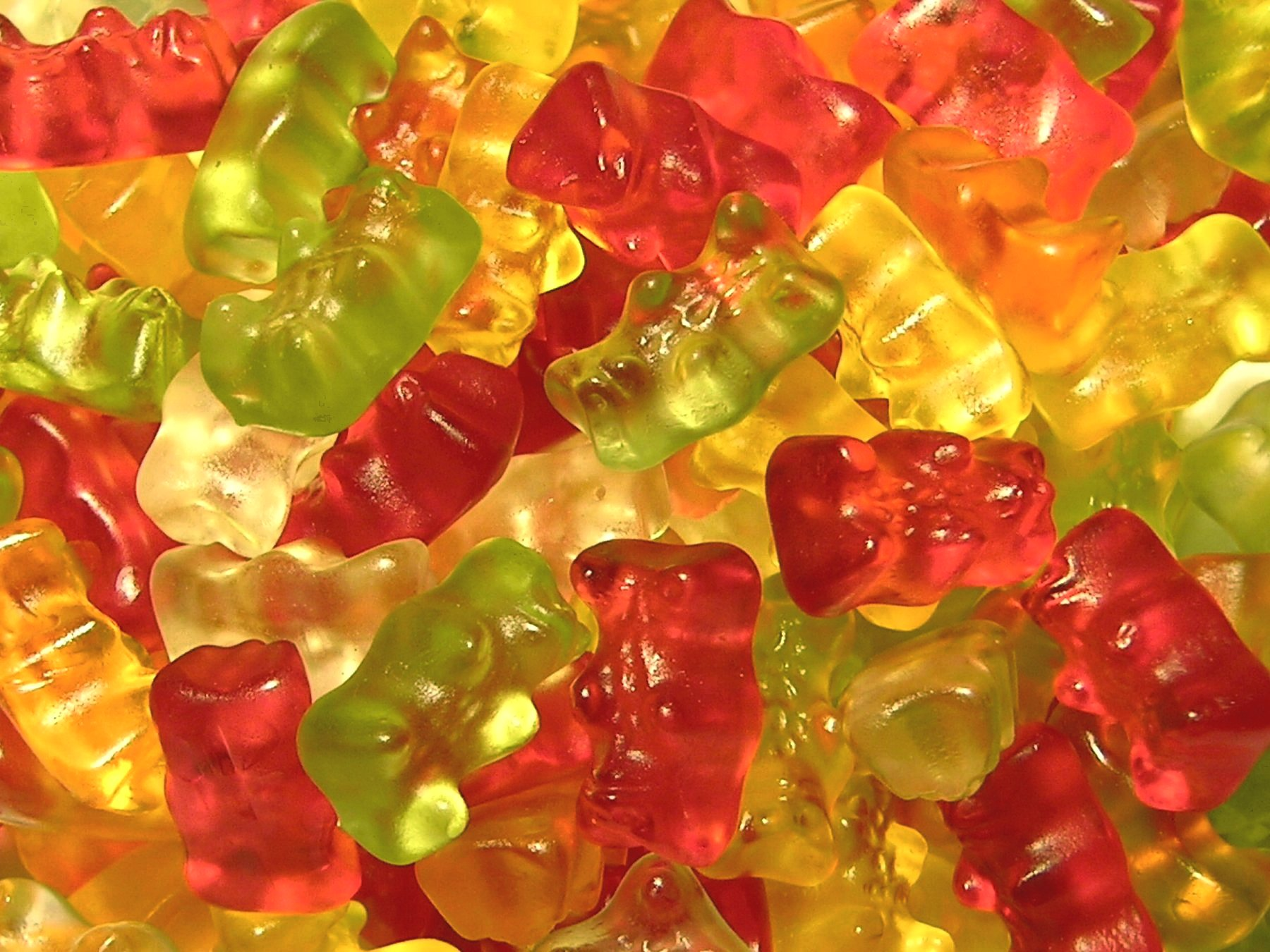
Gummy bears

== See also ==
- Dagashi, cheap candies and snacks in Japan
