= Teaberry =

Teaberry may refer to:

== Plants ==
- Gaultheria procumbens, a North American plant species also known as the eastern teaberry
- Myrteola nummularia, a South American plant species known as teaberry

== Food ==
- Teaberry ice cream, an ice cream flavor
- Clark's Teaberry, a brand of chewing gum

== People ==
- Connie Teaberry (born 1970), American high jumper

== Places ==
- Teaberry, Kentucky, United States, an unincorporated community
- Teaberry, West Virginia, United States, an unincorporated community

== Other uses ==
- USS Teaberry, a World War II net laying ship
