= David L. Clark =

American businessman (1864–1939)

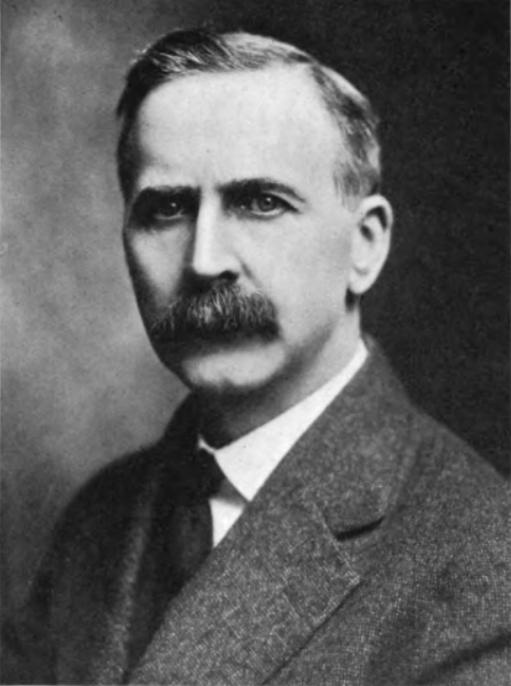
Clark in 1913

David Lytle Clark (26 September 1864 – 3 February 1939) was an Irish entrepreneur who founded the D. L. Clark Company confectioners in 1886 in Allegheny, Pennsylvania, now part of Pittsburgh. He was born in County Londonderry, Ireland, the son of Samuel and Jane Clark. He had come to the U.S. with his family from Ireland when he was eight years old, and educated in the public schools. He began making candy in a one-room location in Allegheny City at the age of 19, and later expanded into making gum when learning in 1886 of a new approach using chicle. This he would use bright food coloring and flavor it with extracts of woodland leaves he had chewed as a boy. He is best known for his creation of the D. L. Clark Company, a confectionary, and for creating some of its best known products, including the Clark bar and the Zagnut, as well as for its spinoff, the Clark Chewing Gum Company with its Clark's Teaberry gum.

Clark also served as president of several additional candy companies in the region: the Youngstown Candy Company, Steubenville's LaBelle Candy Company, McKeesport's Jewell Candy Company, and the Fayette Candy Company of Uniontown, also being co-owner of the Beaver Falls Model Candy Company. He would also serve as director of McKeesport's First National Bank. He was also a freemason. At the time of his death, in his sleep of heart disease in 1939, he was called 'Pittsburgh's candy king'.

He married twice, first to Martha Snitger, the mother of his 13 children, of which 6 sons and 6 daughters survived him. Following Martha's death, he would remarry to her sister, Carrie Snitger. His children all shared in inheriting the D. L. Clark Company, before selling it in 1955 to Beatrice Foods.
