= Brynwood Partners =

American private equity investment firm

- Industry: Private equity
- Founded: 1984; 42 years ago
- Founder: Hendrik J. Hartong, Jr.
- Headquarters: Greenwich, Connecticut, U.S.
- Key people: Hendrik J. Hartong III (chairman & CEO); Ian B. MacTaggart (president & COO); Nicholas DiCarlo (CFO); Guy Einav (CCO)
- Products: Leveraged buyout, Growth capital
- Total assets: $250 million
- Website: www.brynwoodpartners.com

Brynwood Partners is an American private equity investment firm focused on leveraged buyout and other control investments.

Since its founding in 1984, the firm, headquartered in Greenwich, Connecticut, has raised five investment funds, including a $250 million fund in 2005. Through these funds, the company owns firms and brands including Juicy Juice, Balance Bar, and Pearson's Candy Company (Nut Goodie, Salted Nut Roll, Mint Patties, Bun Bars and Bit-O-Honey).

The company's managing partners include Hendrik "Henk" J. Hartong, Jr. (co-founder), who managed Air Express International in the mid-1980s until its 1.15-billion-dollar acquisition by Deutsche Post in 1999. Other managing partners include Hendrik J. Hartong III, Ian B MacTaggart, Dario U. Margve, Kevin C. Hartnett, Joan Y. Mccabe and Nicholas DiCarlo (CFO).

== Investments ==
In 1988, Brynwood Partners purchased Richelieu Foods, a supplier of private-label food products and frozen pizzas. The company produces over 50 million frozen pizzas and more than 20 million finished crusts annually, reporting more than $200 million in yearly sales, and producing private label products for companies including Aldi, Save-A-Lot, Shaw's Supermarkets, Hannaford Brothers Co., BJ's Wholesale Club and Sam's Club.

In 2004, Brynwood acquired New York-based freight forwarder IJS Global Inc.

In 2004, Brynwood Partners sold Lincoln Snacks Company, which made Fiddle Faddle, Screaming Yellow Zonkers and Poppycock.

In 2014, Brynwood Partners acquired the Juicy Juice brand and business from Nestlé.

In 2018, Brynwood Partners bought the Funfetti, Hungry Jack, Martha White, Pillsbury and Jim Dandy baking brands from The J.M. Smucker Company for $375 million, "Brynwood created Hometown Food" to run that asset. In October 2019, Hometown Food acquired grain-based foods manufacturer Arrowhead Mills and baking and confectionery manufacturer SunSpire from Hain Celestial Group for $15 million. The deal includes a manufacturing plant in Hereford, Texas.

In 2025, they purchased Chef Boyardee.

=== Pearson's Candy ===
In 2011, Brynwood acquired Pearson's Candy Company, which was founded in 1909 in Saint Paul, Minnesota. One of the world's 100 largest confectionery companies, Pearson's makes Pearson's Mints, Salted Nut Rolls, Nut Goodies, Bun Bars and Bit-O-Honey.

== Former Investments ==
=== High Ridge Brands ===
High Ridge Brands is the owner of Coast, Zest, Vo5, Rave, White Rain (2012-2021), L. A. Looks, Salon Graphix, Thicker Fuller Hair, Zero Frizz hair products and Dr. Fresh, Firefly, Reach oral health products and Binaca breath freshening products.

In June 2016, Clayton, Dubilier & Rice acquired a controlling stake in High Ridge Brands.

=== DeMet's Candy Company ===
In 2003, Brynwood bought Pretzel Flipz, a line of yogurt-covered pretzels made in Mohnton, Pa., from Nestlé.

In 2007, Brynwood bought the "Turtles" brand from Nestle USA Inc., acquiring at the same time the 280,000-square-foot (26,000 m^{2}) Turtles production facility in Toronto, Canada — merging the acquisition with a company it owned at the time, Signature Snacks Company.

Subsequently, Brynwood consolidated its portfolio of confectionery acquisitions, which included Stixx, Pretzel Flipz, Treasures, and Turtles, resurrecting the dormant DeMet's Candy Company name. DeMet's started in 1898 as a candy store business and soda fountain shop by George DeMet of Chicago — subsequently creating Turtles candies. After a series of mergers and acquisitions, DeMet’s was purchased by Nestlé in 1988. In 2007, Signature Snacks, then owned by Brynwood, acquired the DeMet’s brand from Nestlé. Former Nestlé USA executive Hendrik Hartong III is chairman of the company. In 2013, Brynwood sold the company to Yıldız Holding.

=== Stella D’Oro ===
In 2006, Brynwood bought Stella D'Oro Biscuit Co. from Kraft Foods. On August 4, 2008, workers of the Bakery, Confectionery, Tobacco Workers and Grain Millers' International Union went on strike citing proposed pay and benefit cuts and later picketed the company's attempt to bring in replacement workers.

After more than 11 months on strike, the company was required by a court ruling to reinstate the workers. However, shortly thereafter, the company announced in July 2009 that it would close the Kingsbridge, Bronx facility. In September 2009, Brynwood announced the sale of Stella D'Oro to Lance Inc., a large manufacturer of snack foods, which intended to relocate Stella D'Oro's production to a non-union facility in Ashland, Ohio.

Brynwood received negative attention for its role in the work stoppage and sale of Stella d'Oro, including a reference in an op-ed piece by the AFL-CIO's Richard Trumka, published in The Wall Street Journal in April 2010.
