= 5th Avenue (candy) =

American candy bar

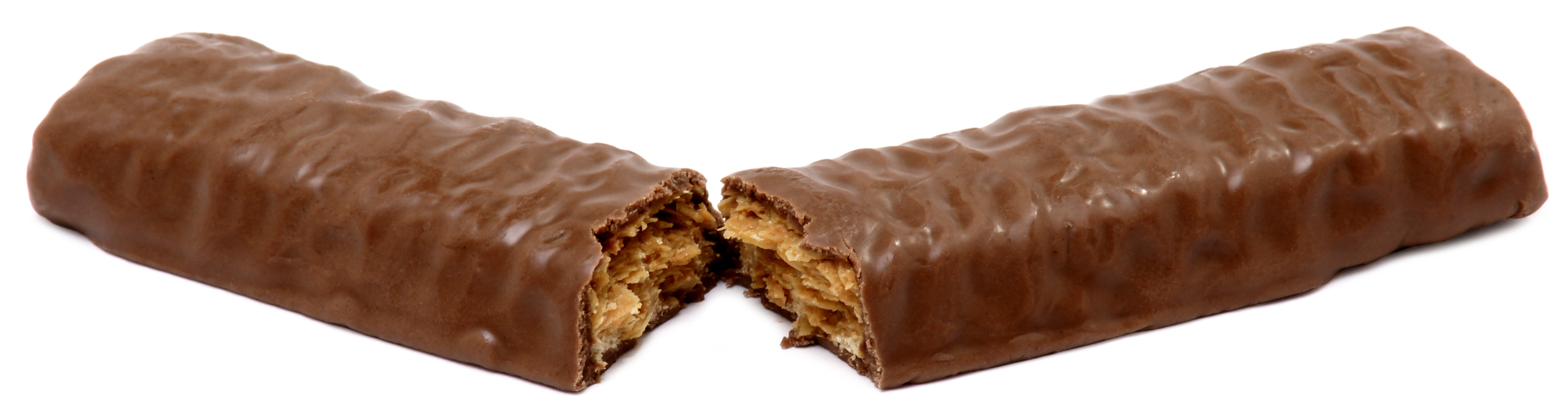
- A candy bar with layers of crunchy peanut butter covered in milk chocolate
- Product type: Chocolate Bar
- Current owner: The Hershey Company
- Produced by: The Hershey Company
- Country: United States
- Introduced: 1936; 90 years ago
- Markets: United States
- Previous owners: Luden's
- Tagline: "It'll Make You Go Crunch"; "More Bunches of Crunches"; "The Right Taste, at the Right Time"; "It's Everything It's Cracked Up to Be"
- Website: hersheyland.com/5th-avenue

The 5th Avenue is a candy bar introduced in 1936, consisting of peanut butter crunch layers enrobed in chocolate. It is currently produced and marketed by The Hershey Company.

The bar is similar to the Clark Bar which was first produced in Pittsburgh in 1917 by the D.L. Clark Company, now produced by the Boyer Candy Company of Altoona, Pennsylvania. It is also similar in composition to the Butterfinger candy bar, first developed and manufactured by Curtiss Candy Company, later manufactured by successors including Nestlé and Ferrara.

== History ==
The candy bar was introduced in 1936 by Luden's, at the time a subsidiary of Food Industries of Philadelphia. In 1936, Luden’s Inc. (of cough drop fame) introduced 5TH AVENUE Candy Bars, named after the main street in Reading, Pennsylvania where the company was located. Hershey Foods Corporation acquired Luden's brands from the Dietrich Corporation, a successor to Food Industries of Philadelphia, in 1986. Despite not being advertised since 1993, the candy bar is still available in many smaller retailers.

The original candy bar was topped with almonds, but these were removed in the 1990s as a cost-saving measure.

== In popular culture ==
- The candy bar was a huge favorite of H. Clay Earles, founder of Virginia's Martinsville Speedway, and it was the only candy sold as a concession at the track until his death in 1999.
- This candy appeared in the 1994 sci-fi movie Stargate and the Seinfeld episode "The Dealership".

== See also ==
- List of chocolate bar brands
- List of peanut dishes
