= Clark Bar =

Candy bar

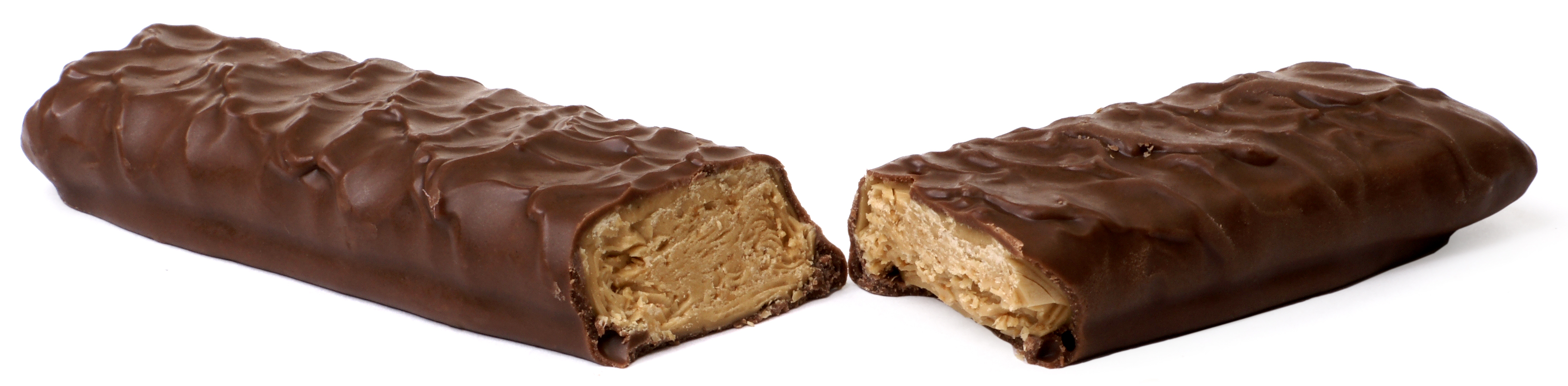
- A Clark Bar, broken in half.
- Product type: Candy bar
- Current owner: Boyer
- Country: United States
- Introduced: 1917; 109 years ago
- Related brands: Zagnut
- Markets: North America
- Previous owners: D. L. Clark Company; Beatrice; Leaf; Pittsburgh Food & Beverage; Clark Bar America; Necco

The Clark Bar is a candy bar consisting of a crispy peanut butter/spun taffy core (originally with a caramel center) and coated in milk chocolate. It was introduced in 1917 by David L. Clark and was popular during and after both World Wars. It was the first American "combination" candy bar to achieve nationwide success. Two similar candy bars followed the Clark Bar, the Butterfinger bar (1923) made by the Curtiss Candy Company and the 5th Avenue bar (1936) created by Luden's.

The Clark Bar was manufactured in Pittsburgh, Pennsylvania, by the original family-owned business until 1955. It was then manufactured by corporate owners until a series of sales and bankruptcies in the 1990s resulted in transfer of production to the Revere, Massachusetts–based New England Confectionery Company (Necco). Following Necco's 2018 bankruptcy, the Clark Bar is now produced in western Pennsylvania, by the Altoona-based Boyer Candy Company.

== History ==
The original formula of the Clark Bar was pioneered by Irish immigrant David L. Clark in Pittsburgh, Pennsylvania, in 1917. Its manufacture took advantage of a recently developed approach that allowed a thin milk chocolate shell to surround a non-chocolate filling. In the case of the Clark Bar, the interior consisted of a crispy confection that included ground peanuts around a caramel core. As such, the Clark Bar became the first successful "combination" candy bar. The bar was developed to be sent to troops during World War I, individually wrapped for ease of delivery. It began to be distributed nationally after the war's end, inspiring many manufacturers to produce their own combination bars. The small size of its double-bars contributed to their popularity. During World War II the company was sending daily 1.5 million bars to the armed forces, and when several labor strikes at its plant led to shortages among the troops, the federal government stepped in, calling production "essential" to the war effort. Related products have also been produced, such as the smaller-sized Clark Bar Miniatures, Clark Bar Bites and Clark Bar Juniors, along with seasonal Clark Bar Easter Eggs, and a dark chocolate variety.

The Clark Bar originally included a caramel "center of attraction". In 1965, the recipe was changed to increase the peanut butter content and thus enhance flavor. The caramel center would be removed from the recipe in the 1980s to increase its shelf-life. In 1995, an alternative recipe would briefly be used.

=== Ownership changes ===
From 1911, the Clark company operated out of a North Side production facility, and this was long where the Clark Bar was produced. The illuminated oversized roof-top Clark Bar sign that decorated the original North Side factory would become a Pittsburgh landmark, while a restaurant that operates in the retasked building is named the Clark Bar & Grill in reflection of the treat once made there.

The D. L. Clark Co. and its Clark Bar were acquired by Beatrice Foods in 1955, then sold to Leaf Candy Company in 1983. It was under Leaf that production was moved to a new facility in O'Hara Township (suburban Pittsburgh) in 1986. In late 1990, Leaf announced plans to close its O'Hara facility and move production of two other D. L. Clark candy bars, the Zagnut and P. B. Crunchers, to the Chicago area. They decided to cease production of the other Clark products, including the Clark Bar, for which their marketing efforts had failed to achieve a national profile.

Pittsburgh-area entrepreneur Michael Carlow purchased D. L. Clark Co. and its remaining brands from Leaf, and combined it with another struggling but iconic local producer, the Pittsburgh Brewing Company and its Iron City beer, as well as a local bakery and a glass manufacturer, plus the Fort Wayne, Indiana-based producer of Bun Bars, under the umbrella of the Pittsburgh Food & Beverage Company, continuing production of the Clark Bar in O'Hara. However, amidst accusations of a check kiting scheme that would lead to Carlow's eventual imprisonment, he was forced to relinquish control in 1995, and production ceased. Leaf then foreclosed on a $3 million loan they were still owed, and commenced making Clark Bars at their Illinois facility with an altered recipe. Months later, Clark's assets were sold through bankruptcy court to the newly formed Clark Bar America, Inc., which restarted production at the O'Hara facility using the prior recipe. This was short-lived, and the company was shuttered in 1999. The recipe and production equipment were bought at bankruptcy by Necco for $4.1 million, and they moved production to their facility in Revere, Massachusetts.

Almost two decades later, Necco would in turn fail and in May 2018 was sold at bankruptcy court to Round Hill Investments LLC, who briefly operated the candy manufacturer under a Sweetheart Candy Co. subsidiary before selling the assets in July 2018 and abruptly closing Necco's Revere production facility. The undisclosed buyer, later revealed to have been Spangler Candy Company, would in turn sell the rights to the Clark Bar to the Boyer Candy Company, maker of the Mallo Cup. Based in Altoona, Pennsylvania, they had originally bid on the Clark Bar in the 1990s. At the time of purchase, Boyer planned to restart production of the Clark Bar in western Pennsylvania within six months. Challenges with production machinery speed and reproducing the bar's consistency and shape pushed back their reintroduction, but did provide the raw material for Boyer's first Clark-related product, the Clark Cup, a peanut butter cup that originally included ground misshapen Clark Bar in the filling. Once Boyer resolved these production issues, the Clark Bar was available at the factory outlet in late December 2019, and was released on a limited basis to stores in the Pittsburgh area in mid-February 2020, to be followed first by a full Pittsburgh release, and then sale nationwide, but as of December 2021, production was still limited, with distribution only to Pittsburgh-area specialty candy stores.

In part due to its historical association with the military, the Clark Bar is the favorite snack of the eponymous lead in the Amazon Prime Video series, Reacher.

== Manufacturing process ==
As described during the period of Necco's ownership, the Clark Bar is produced by a process taking about 90 minutes. The core ingredients are heated into a taffy-like consistency and flattened into a sheet, which is then coated with a layer of peanut butter, and rolled. After cutting into bar-sized lengths, it is enrobed in liquid chocolate, cooled to harden both core and coating, then packaged. The process of manufacturing the Clark Bar was featured on a segment of the documentary television series How It's Made in 2016.

The ingredients for the Clark Bar are as follows: Milk Chocolate (Sugar, Cocoa Butter, Chocolate Liquor, Milk Powder, Butter Oil, Soy Lecithin, Vanilla Extract), Corn Syrup, Sugar, Peanuts, Molasses, Corn Flour, Invert Sugar, Salt, Coconut Oil, Vanilla Extract, and Soy Lecithin.

== See also ==
- List of chocolate bar brands
- List of peanut dishes
