= Libby's =

Canned food brand

- Logo used since 1994
- Formerly: Libby, McNeill & Libby
- Company type: Subsidiary
- Industry: Food
- Founded: 1869; 157 years ago
- Founder: Archibald McNeill; Arthur Libby; Charles Libby
- Fate: Acquired by Nestlé in 1970
- Headquarters: Chicago, Illinois
- Products: Canned food and beverages Frozen foods
- Owner: Libby Brand Holding (trademark owner)
- Parent: Nestlé
- Subsidiaries: Libby Brand Holding ConAgra
- Website: libbys.com

Libby's (Libby, McNeill & Libby) is a brand and former American company that produced canned food and beverages. The firm was established in 1869 in Chicago, Illinois. The Libby's trademark is currently owned by Libby's Brand Holding based in Geneva, Switzerland, and is licensed to several companies around the world, including Nestlé and Conagra Brands.

== History ==
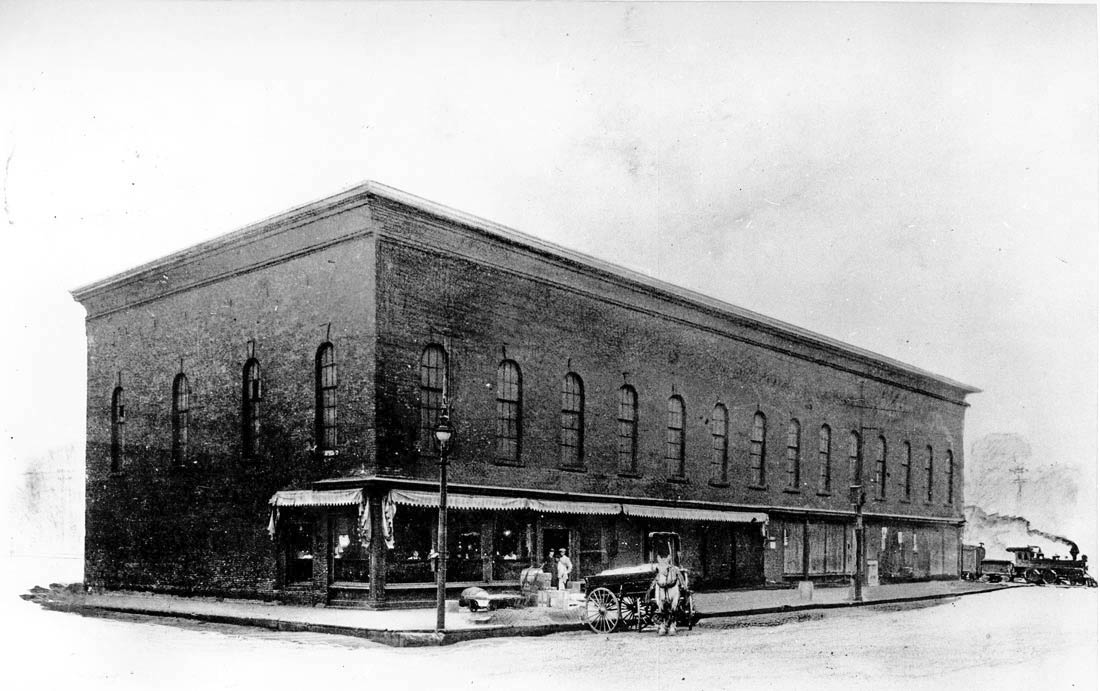
Libby's first plant in Chicago

The company was founded as Libby, McNeill & Libby in Chicago, Illinois, by Archibald McNeill and the brothers Arthur and Charles Libby. The business began with a canned meat product, beef in brine, or corned beef. The company started small and later began experimenting with the preservation of ox, beef, and pork tongues. The product became well known when the company began to package the meat in a trapezoid-shaped can starting in 1875. By 1880, it had 1,500 employees in Chicago. In 1918, William F. Burrows was recorded as the company's chairman.

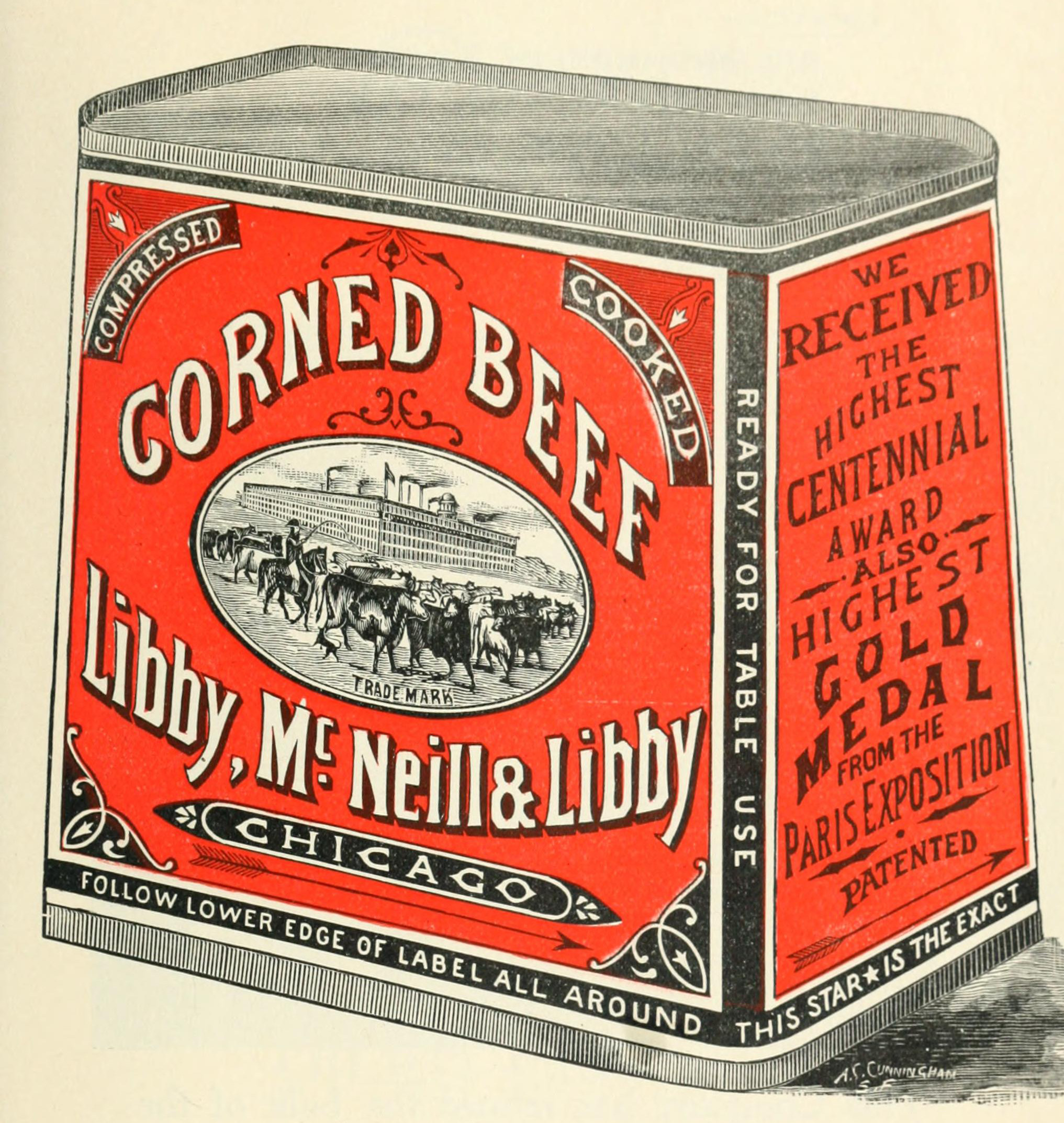
1898 advertisement showing the trapezoidal can of corned beef

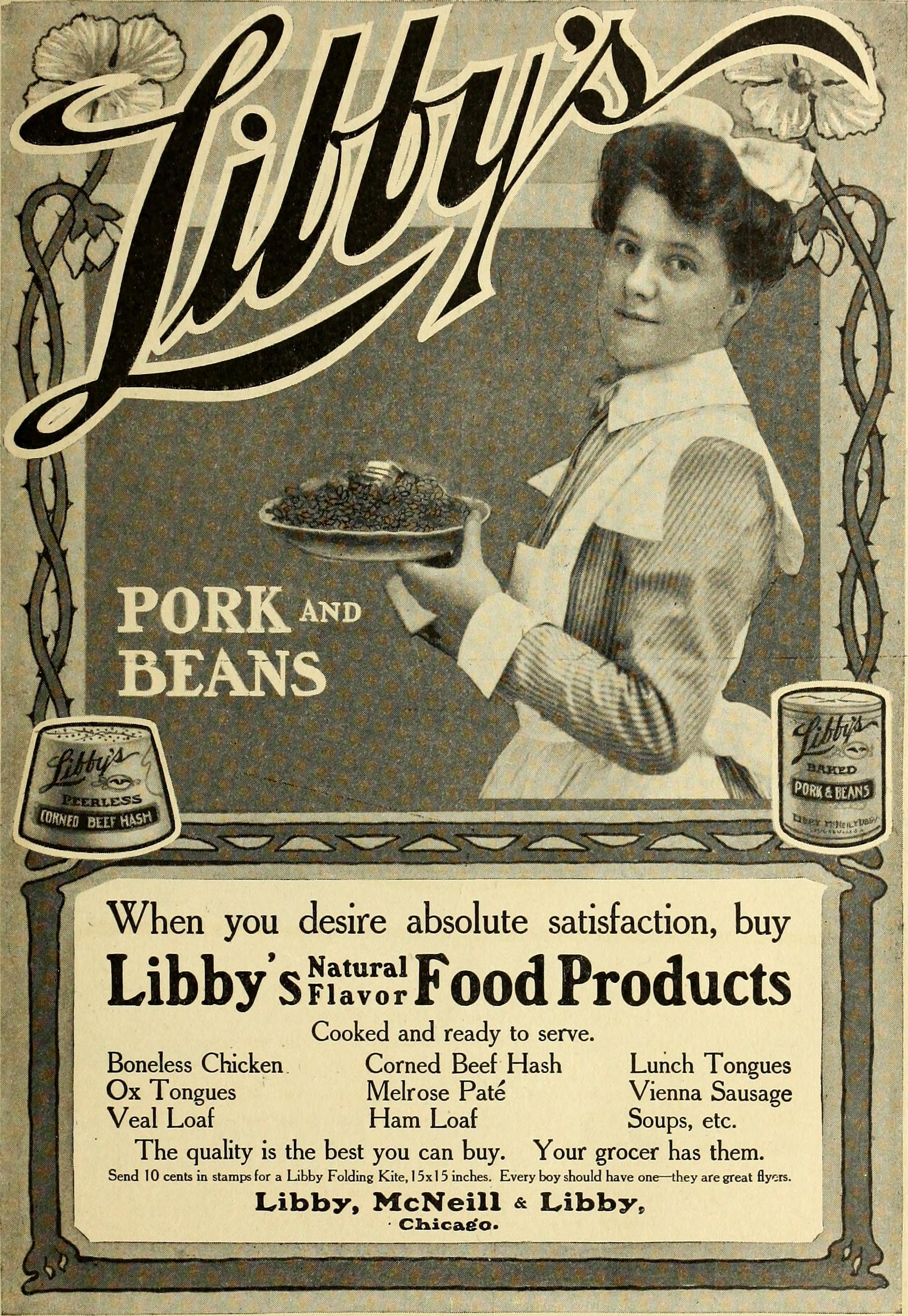
Libby's Pork and Beans ad, 1905

By the middle of the 1930s, Libby's had about 9,000 employees only in the Chicago area. Its annual sales surpassed $100 million during the 1940s. Before and after World War II, Libby's had canning operations outside the United States in Belgium and France, at Leer in northern Germany, and in the United Kingdom.

Libby, McNeill & Libby was acquired by Nestlé in 1970. In the 1970s, "Libbyland"-branded frozen dinners were marketed towards children, using a mascot called "Libby the Kid".

Nestlé introduced Juicy Juice in 1977, and it was branded under Libby's name. In 2006, Nestlé began to market Juicy Juice. In 2014, the Juicy Juice brand and business was sold by Nestlé to Harvest Hill Beverage Company, a portfolio company of Brynwood Partners.

In 1982, Libby's canned vegetable business was acquired by S. S. Pierce Company (now Seneca Foods) and its canned fruits business was acquired by California Canners and Growers (Cal Can). In 1984, Cal Can merged with Tri-Valley Growers. In 2000, Tri-Valley Growers went bankrupt and the bulk of its operations, including the rights to the Libby's canned fruit business, was acquired by Signature Fruit LLC in 2001. In 2006, Seneca Foods acquired Signature Fruit.

Niagara Trading Company (now NTC Marketing, Inc.) acquired a long-term license for the Libby's name for canned pineapple and juices in 1983.

In 1998, Libby's canned meat business was sold by Nestlé to International Home Foods. In 2000, International Home Foods was acquired by ConAgra.

In 2006, Nestlé sold the Libby's trademark to a Swiss entity that became known as "Libby Brand Holding".

In November 2009, Libby's announced that because of poor weather on its Illinois pumpkin farms and a depleted back stock, a canned pumpkin shortage was likely as Thanksgiving approached. Libby's accounts for the vast majority of canned pumpkin production in the United States, and the shortfall prompted Libby's to establish farms in multiple states as a hedge against another mass shortage like the one that happened in 2009.

In 2010, Walton & Post, Inc. acquired a long-term license for the Libby's trademark for several items, including nectars, creamers, and prepared meals.

In 2015, Peaty Mills plc. acquired the Libby's trademark license for preserved foods in the UK, Ireland and Portugal with the exceptions of corned beef, pumpkin and fruit juices. The trademark license for fruit juice in the UK is held by Refresco.

Libby's trademark in Canary Islands, Spain and Portugal is licensed to Establecimientos Industriales Archipiélago S.A.

== Advertising ==
Isolated wordmark used since 1994

In the 1970s, Libby's had a successful television advertising campaign featuring their jingle, "When it says Libby's Libby's Libby's on the label, label, label, you will like it, like it, like it, on your table, table, table."
