= Zagnut =

Candy bar

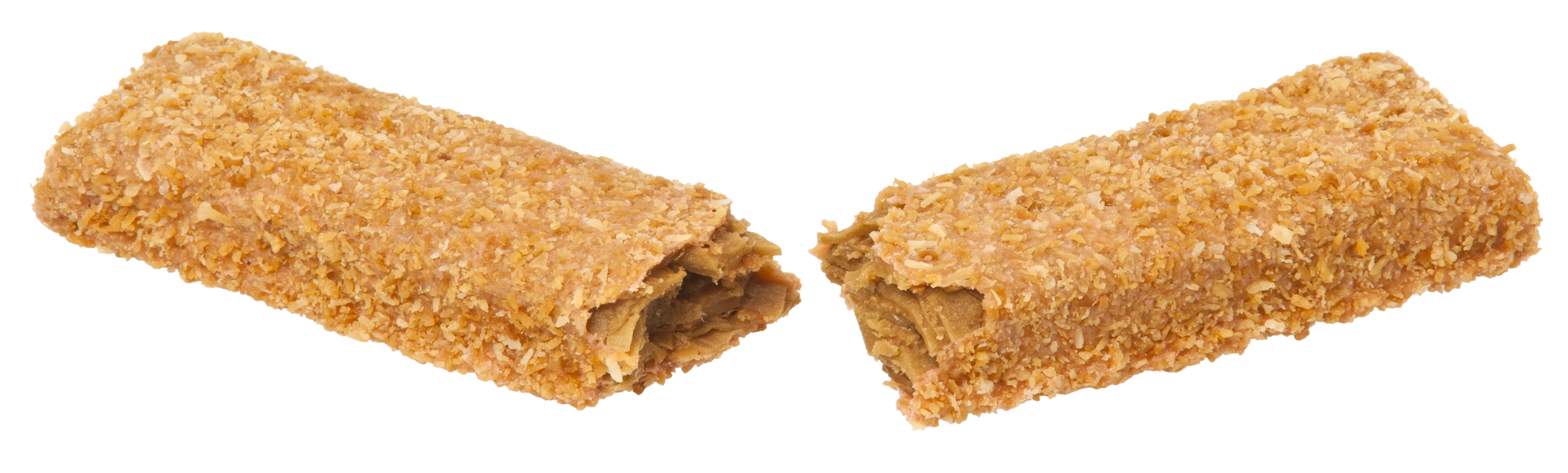
- A cross-section of a Zagnut bar, with a peanut butter center covered in a layer of coconut
- Product type: Confectionery
- Current owner: The Hershey Company
- Produced by: The Hershey Company
- Country: United States
- Introduced: 1930
- Related brands: Mounds
- Markets: United States
- Previous owners: D. L. Clark Company; Beatrice Foods; Leaf International
- Website: Zagnut Candy Bar

Zagnut is a candy bar produced and sold in the United States. Its main ingredients are peanut butter and toasted coconut.

== History ==
The Zagnut bar was launched in 1930, by the D. L. Clark Company of western Pennsylvania, which also made the Clark bar. Clark changed its name to the Pittsburgh Food & Beverage company and was acquired by Leaf International in 1983. The Zagnut brand was later part of an acquisition by Hershey Foods Corporation in 1996.

Bon Appétit, in a story about nostalgic candy, said, "We’re honestly flummoxed that Zagnuts aren’t more popular." Conversely, a columnist in The Des Moines Register compared it to a Rose Art crayon, claiming, "No one would ever purposely choose a Zagnut."

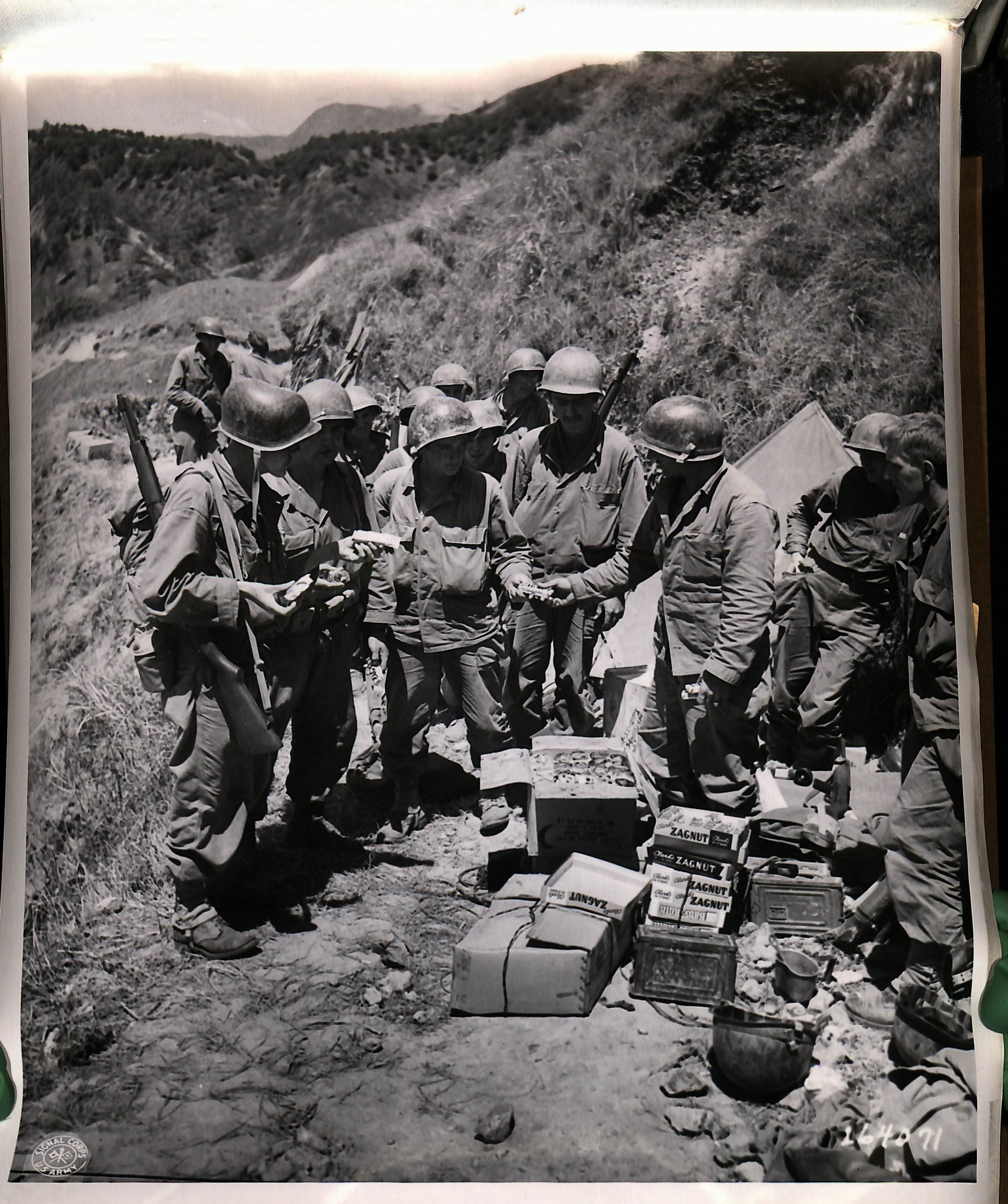
Soldiers of the 127th Infantry Regiment, 32nd Infantry Division (United States) purchasing Zagnut bars at a forward post exchange near San Fernando, Pampanga, Luzon, Commonwealth of the Philippines. U.S. Army Signal Corps photo, April 21, 1945.

== See also ==
- Coconut candy
