= Mallo Cup =

Coconut chocolate candy

Mallo Cups
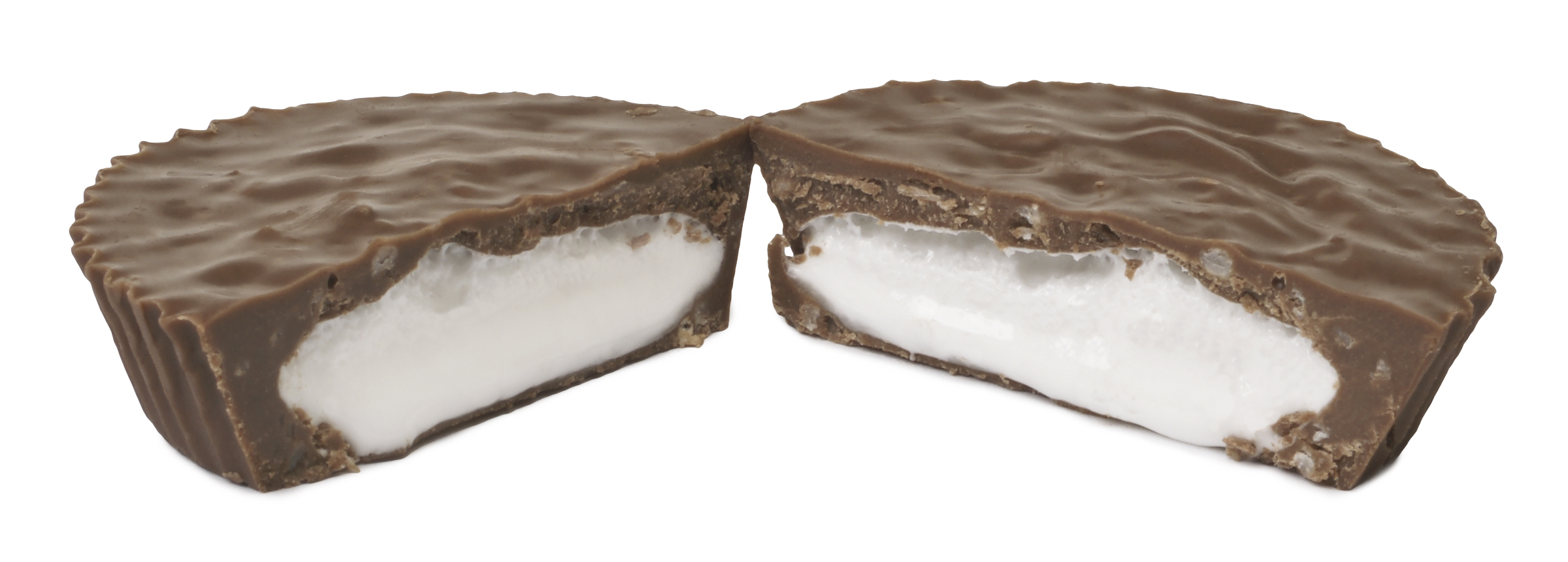
- A split Mallo Cup
- Current owner: Boyer (candy company)
- Country: United States
- Introduced: 1936; 90 years ago
- Website: www.boyercandies.com

Mallo Cups are an American milk chocolate cup-shaped candy that contains a whipped coconut-marshmallow center invented in 1936 by Boyer.

== History ==
Brothers Bill and Bob Boyer began with production of candies such as fudge and nut clusters in 1936 in their own kitchen as a means of supplementing income during the Great Depression. The candy was wrapped by their mother and sister and the brothers sold the candy door to door. Eventually, production moved to a manufacturing facility and they began experimenting with chocolate. These experiments led to the creation of the Mallo Cup.

Mallo Cups are made from the following ingredients: Milk chocolate (sugar, cocoa butter, milk, chocolate liquor, and soy lecithin), corn syrup, sugar, water, coconut, dextrin, egg whites, salt, guar gum, natural and artificial flavor, potassium sorbate (to preserve freshness) and soy lecithin.

In November 2010, Boyer introduced a dark chocolate version of the Mallo Cup.

== Production ==
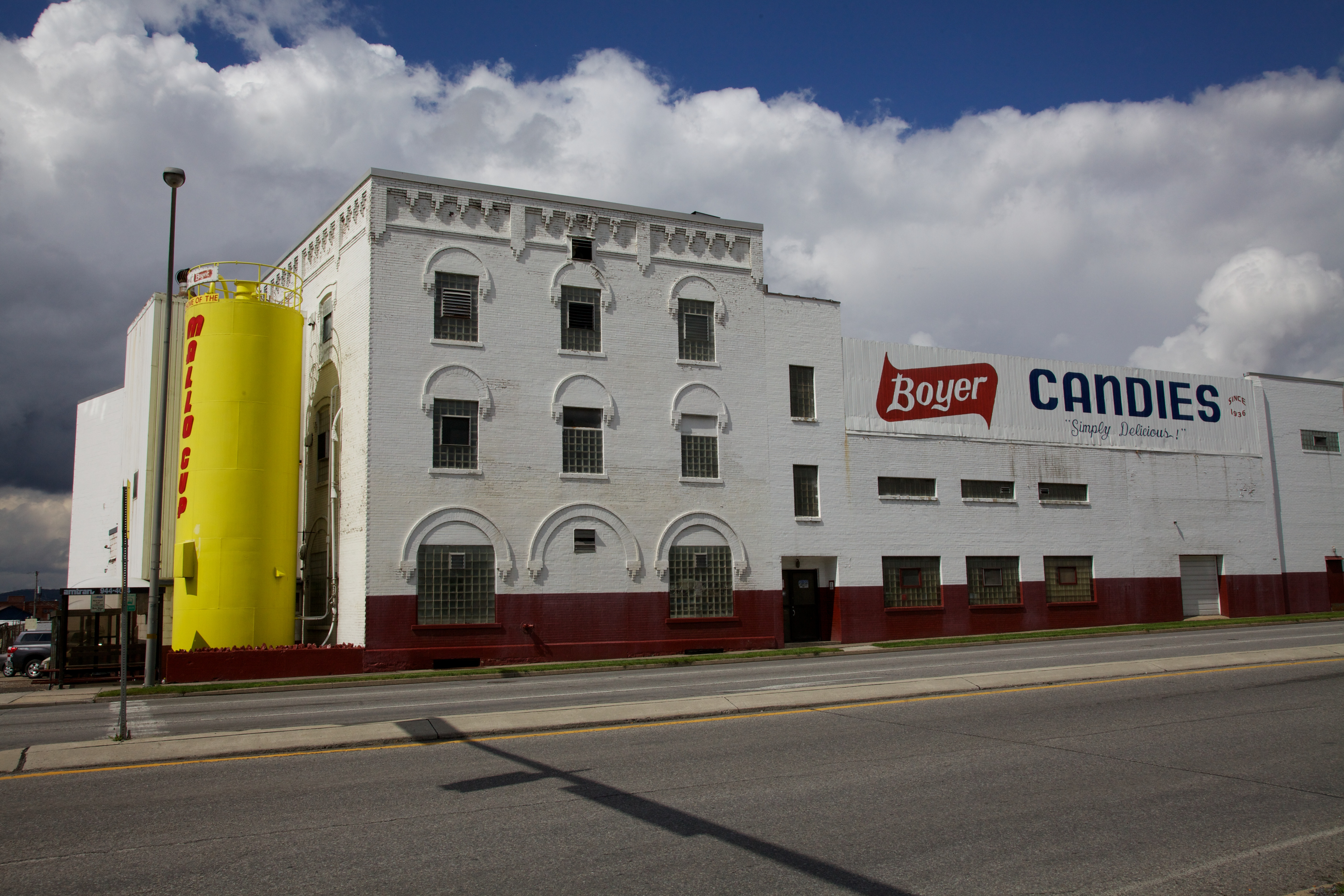
Boyer's manufacturing plant in Altoona

Mallo Cups are produced at Boyer's factory in Altoona, Pennsylvania.

== Mallo Cup Points ==
Mallo Cup cardboard wrapper inserts printed with illustrations of coins called "Mallo Cup Points" were introduced a few years after the Mallo Cup. The cardboard coins can be cut out and saved then redeemed for items from the company's prize catalogue, including Mallo Cup candies, clothing, toys, and other collectibles.
