= Richelieu Foods =

American food manufacturing company

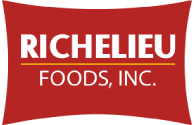
- Type: Private
- Industry: Private label foods
- Founded: 1862; 164 years ago
- Headquarters: Wheeling, Illinois, U.S.
- Key people: Chris Dugan, CEO
- Products: Food
- Number of employees: 1000 (2022)
- Parent: Freiberger USA, Inc. (Südzucker AG)
- Website: www.richelieufoods.com

Richelieu Foods is an American private label food manufacturing company founded in 1862 and headquartered in Wheeling, Illinois. It was previously owned by investment group Brynwood Partners and owned by investment group Centerview Partners LLC from 2010 to December 2017, when it was sold to Parsippany, New Jersey–based Freiberger USA Inc., a subsidiary of the German Südzucker AG.

The company produces frozen pizza. Previously, it also produced salad dressing, sauces, marinades, and condiments to be marketed by other companies as their store brand or white label brand. Richelieu Foods manufactures over 100 million frozen pizzas and more than 25 million finished crusts annually, reporting more than $500 million in yearly sales.

"Odds are good most people have tasted products made at Richelieu Foods... few people know the products... were made by the company."

Waterloo Cedar Falls Courier, WCFcourier.com, August 2006

Companies with private label items from Richelieu include Hy-Vee, Aldi, Save-A-Lot, Sam's Club, Hannaford Brothers Co., BJ's Wholesale Club (Earth's Pride brand) and Shaw's Supermarkets (Culinary Circle brand). The company's own brands have included Chef Antonio, Raveena's, Pizza Presto!, Grocer's Garden, Caterer's Collection, Oak Park, and Willow Farms.

With approximately 1,000 employees, Richelieu Foods operates two manufacturing facilities in Beaver Dam, Wisconsin (pizza) and Wheeling, IL (pizza). The Washington Court House, Ohio (cold press pizza crusts) location was closed in 2025. The Grundy Center, Iowa (sauces and dressings) location was closed in 2023. The Elk Grove Village, Illinois (sauces and dressings) location was sold in 2024.

According to Hoover's, Richelieu Foods' average annual revenue per worker is about $900,000.

== History ==
The company was founded in 1862. By 1956, the company operated as Western Dressing Inc. It was sold to an investment group in 1988. The group had the company expand its line of products. In 1994, Richelieu focused on the contract packing and private label areas. The Western Dressing brand was sold and eventually acquired by Unilever with Richelieu Foods packing the dressing until Unilever took it in-house eight years later, marketing it under the Wish Bone brand. In 2003, a Connecticut private equity firm, Brynwood Partners, purchased the company.

In 2006, the company was named Pizza Manufacturer of the Year by Snack Food and Wholesale Bakery magazine. On August 30, 2008, the company acquired the "Sauces and Dressings" division of Sara Lee Foodservice along with the Sara Lee manufacturing facility located in Elk Grove Village, Illinois. In 2010, the company was purchased by Centerview Partners, a private equity firm then by Freiberger USA in 2017.

== See also ==
- List of food companies
- List of frozen food brands
