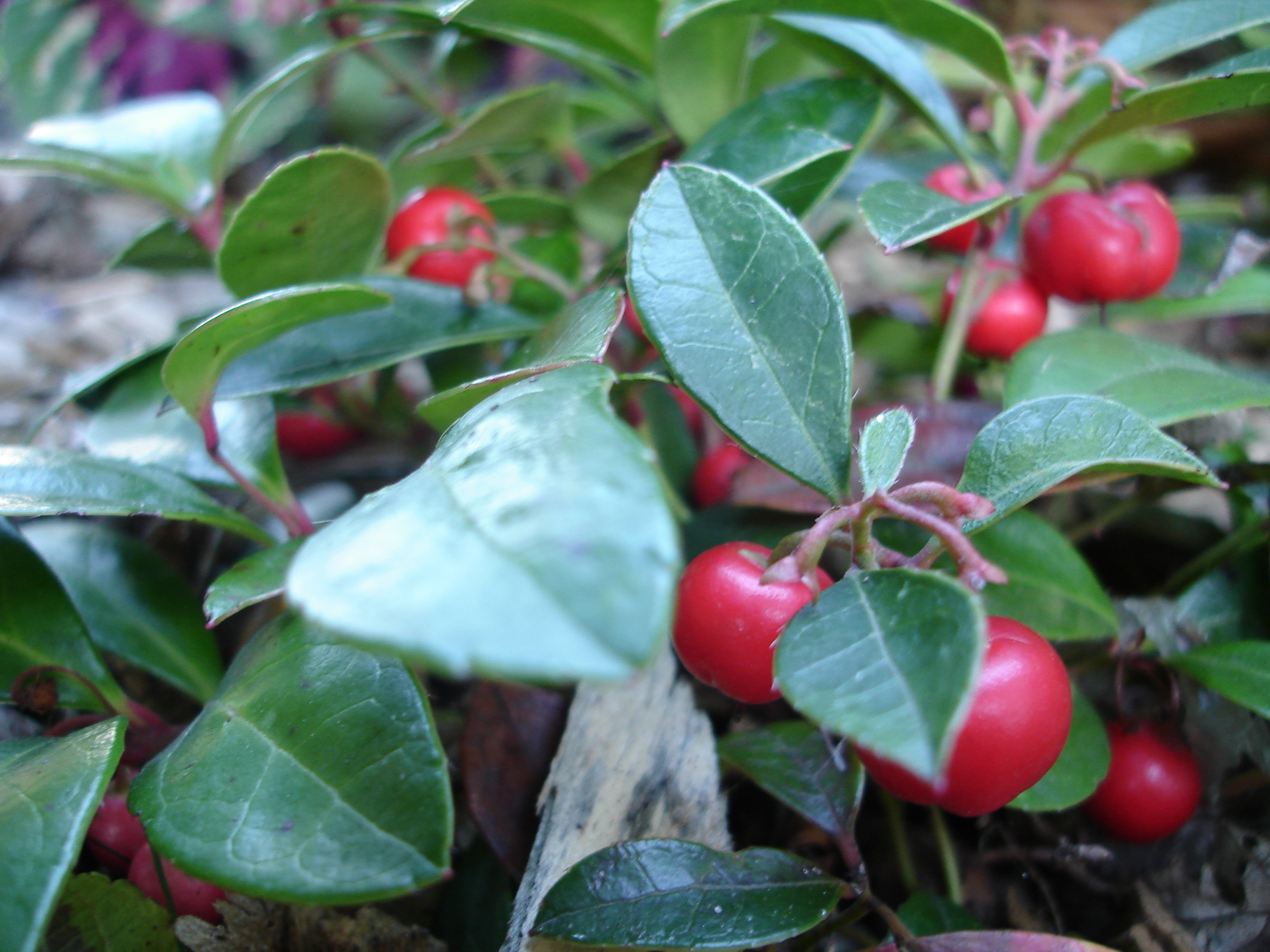
- The ripe berries in October in Hammond, Indiana

Scientific classification
- Kingdom: Plantae
- Clade: Tracheophytes
- Clade: Angiosperms
- Clade: Eudicots
- Clade: Asterids
- Order: Ericales
- Family: Ericaceae
- Genus: Gaultheria
- Species: G. procumbens

Binomial name
- Gaultheria procumbens L.

= Gaultheria procumbens =

Species of flowering plant

Gaultheria procumbens, also called the eastern teaberry, the checkerberry, (Note: This name also sometimes refers to Mitchella repens (the partridge berry).) the boxberry, or the American wintergreen, is a perennial species of Gaultheria native to northeastern North America from Newfoundland west to southeastern Manitoba, and south to Alabama. It is a member of the Ericaceae (heath family).

== Growth and habitat ==
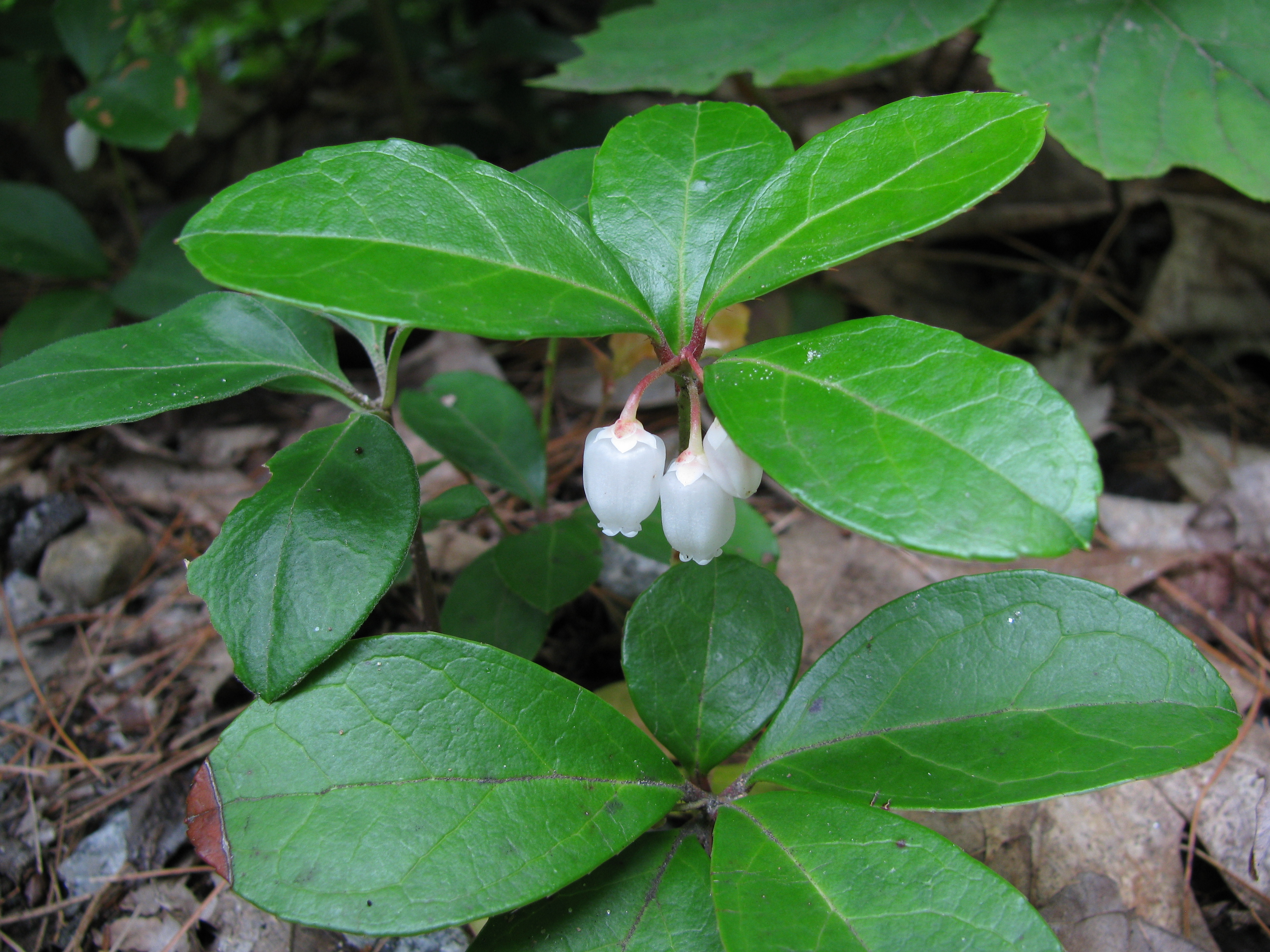
Flowers blooming in July in Vermont

G. procumbens is a small, low-growing shrub, typically reaching 10–15 cm (4–6 in) tall. The leaves are evergreen, elliptic to ovate, 2–5 cm (3/4–2 in) long and 1–2 cm (1/2–3/4 in) broad, with a distinct oil of wintergreen scent.

The flowers are pendulous, with a white, sometimes pink-tinged, bell-shaped corolla with five teeth at the tip 8–10 mm (0.31–0.39 in) long, and above it a white calyx. They are borne in leaf axils, usually one to three per stem. The anthers are forked somewhat like a snake's tongue, with two awns at the tip.

The fruit is red and 6–9 mm (0.24–0.35 in) across. It is an epigynous berry, with the majority of the flesh of the fruit being composed of the fleshy calyx.

The plant is a calcifuge, favoring acidic soil, in pine or hardwood forests, although it generally produces fruit only in sunnier areas. It often grows as part of the heath complex in an oak–heath forest.

G. procumbens spreads by means of long rhizomes, which are within the top 2–3 cm (3/4–1 1/4 in) of soil. Because of the shallow nature of the rhizomes, it does not survive most forest fires, but a brief or mild fire may leave rhizomes intact, from which the plant can regrow even if the above-ground shrub was consumed.

This plant has gained the Royal Horticultural Society's Award of Garden Merit.

== Edibility ==
The fruits of G. procumbens, considered its actual "teaberries", are edible, with a taste of mildly sweet wintergreen similar to the flavors of the Mentha varieties M. piperita (peppermint) and M. spicata (spearmint) even though G. procumbens is not a true mint. The leaves and branches make a fine herbal tea through the normal drying and infusion process. For the leaves to yield significant amounts of their essential oil, they need to be fermented for at least three days. The berries and leaves contain methyl salicylate, a compound that is closely related to aspirin.

Teaberry extract can be used to flavor tea, candy, medicine, and chewing gum. Teaberry is also a regional flavor of ice cream in Pennsylvania. It likewise inspired the name of Clark's Teaberry chewing gum.

== Wildlife value ==
Wintergreen is not consumed in large quantities by any species of wildlife, but its regular use enhances its importance. Its fruit persists through the winter, and it is one of the few sources of green leaves available during this time. White-tailed deer browse wintergreen throughout its range, and in some localities, it is an important winter food. Other animals that eat wintergreen are wild turkey, sharp-tailed grouse, northern bobwhite, ring-necked pheasant, black bear, white-footed mouse, and red fox. Wintergreen is a favorite food of the eastern chipmunk, and the leaves are a minor winter food of the gray squirrel in Virginia.

== Common names ==
Other common names for G. procumbens include American mountain tea, boxberry, Canada tea, canterberry, checkerberry, chickenberry, creeping wintergreen, deerberry, drunkards, gingerberry, greenberry, ground berry, ground tea, grouseberry, hillberry, mountain tea, one-berry, proclaim, red pollom, spice berry, squaw vine, star berry, spiceberry, spicy wintergreen, spring wintergreen, teaberry, wax cluster, and youngberry.

While this plant is sometimes mistakenly known as partridge berry, that name more often refers to the ground cover Mitchella repens.

== Traditional use ==
Various Native American tribes have used the plant for medicinal purposes. The Delaware, Mohicans, and several other tribes made a tea from wintergreen leaves to treat kidney disorders. The Great Lakes and Eastern Woodlands tribes used a wintergreen poultice as a topical treatment for arthritic pain.

== See also ==
- Clark's Teaberry
- Teaberry ice cream
- Wintergreens
  - Gaultheria humifusa – alpine wintergreen
  - Gaultheria ovatifolia – western teaberry or Oregon spicy wintergreen

== Gallery ==
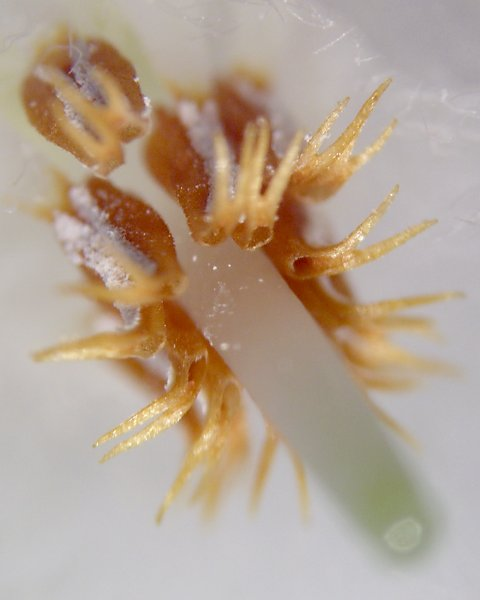
The forked anthers in a dissected flower

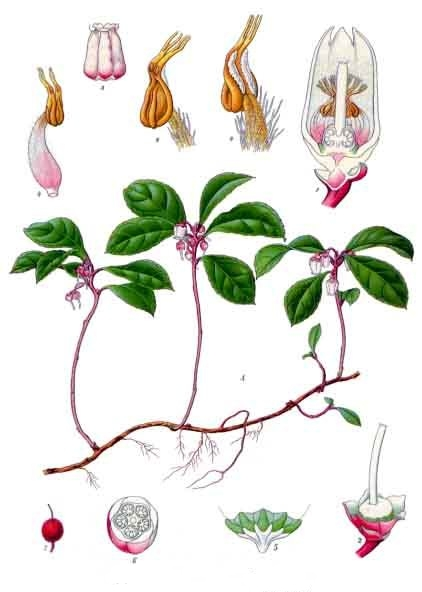
19th century illustration

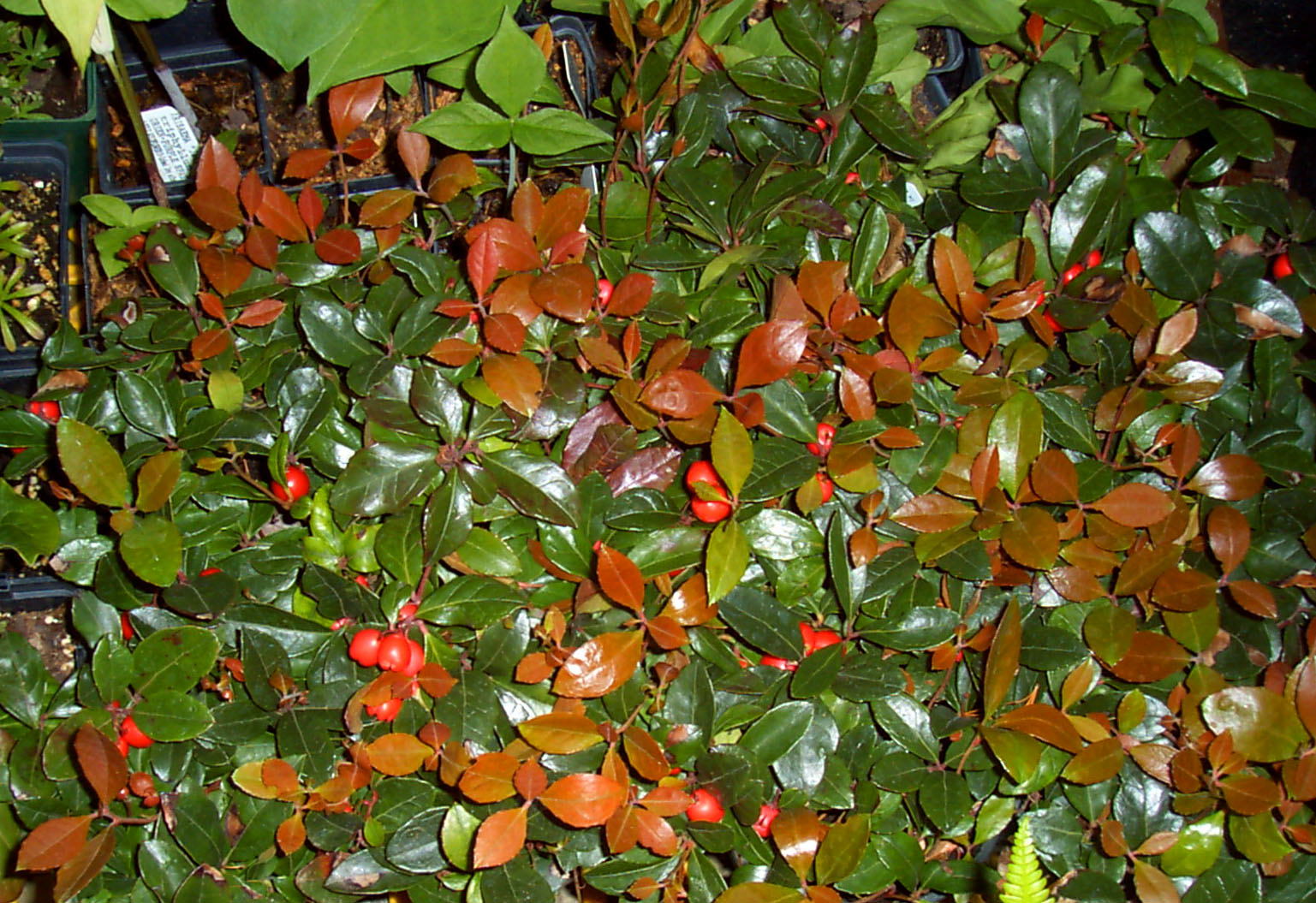
Dense growth with berries and red-tinged new leaves
