= Juicy Juice =

American brand of juices and juice concentrates

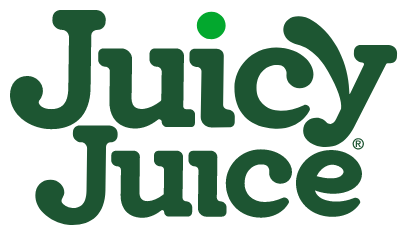
- The logo for the brand, used since 2024
- Product type: Juice
- Current owner: Harvest Hill Beverage Company
- Country: United States
- Introduced: 1977; 49 years ago
- Markets: United States
- Website: juicyjuice.com

Juicy Juice is a brand of juice drinks that targets children and sold in the United States using the slogan "100% Juice."

== History ==
Juicy Juice was introduced by Libby's (then a subsidiary of Nestlé) in 1977. Prior to March 2006, it was known as Libby's Juicy Juice. It was then labeled under the Nestlé parent brand. In 2014, the Juicy Juice brand and business was sold by Nestlé to Harvest Hill Beverage Company, a portfolio company of Brynwood Partners.

== Manufacture ==
Until the sale by Nestlé, Juicy Juice was manufactured in Ocean Spray production facilities, as a result of a 2002 joint agreement between Nestlé and Ocean Spray.
