= Pearson's Candy Company =

American chocolate and confectionery manufacturer

Coordinates: 44°54′23″N 93°9′27″W

- Type: Private company
- Industry: Confectionery/Chocolate
- Founded: 1909; 117 years ago
- Founder: P. Edward Pearson
- Headquarters: Saint Paul, Minnesota
- Key people: Dan Lagermeier, CEO
- Products: See products section
- Revenue: $41,000,000
- Owner: Promise Holdings
- Number of employees: 145
- Website: www.pearsonscandy.com

Pearson's Candy Company is an American chocolate and confectionery manufacturer headquartered in Saint Paul, Minnesota. Founded in Minneapolis, Minnesota as a confectionery distribution firm in 1909, the company began to manufacture its own products in 1912. Originally a family-owned company, Pearson's experienced changes in ownership, acquisitions and product alterations in the 1960s, 1970s, 1980s, and 2018, before its 2022 sale to Annabelle Candy Company, a California confectioner owned by Chicago-based investment firm Promise Holdings.

Pearson's products are produced on five production lines in the company's Saint Paul plant. The company sells its Mint Patties and Salted Nut Roll nationally and its Nut Goodie and Bun Bars products in several Midwestern states. As of 2018, Pearson's was estimated to be the 42nd largest confectionery company in North America by revenue.

== History ==
=== Pearson family ===
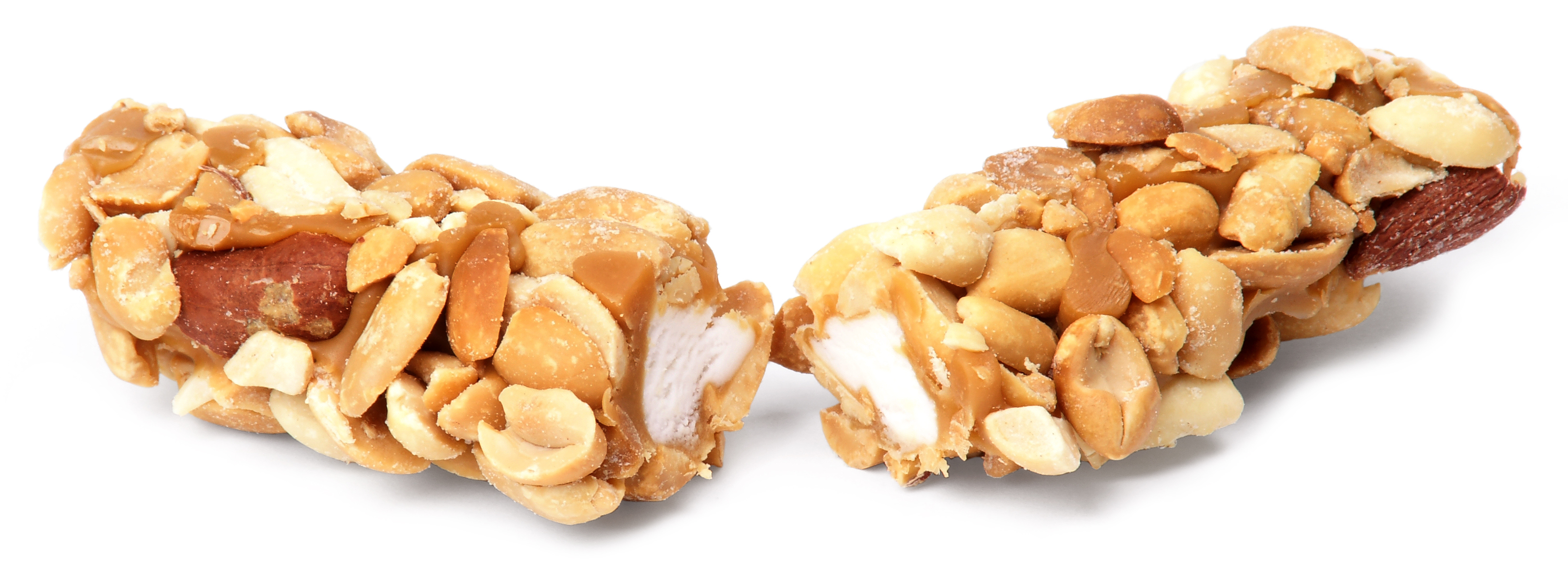
The Salted Nut Roll is Pearson's flagship product.

Pearson's Candy Company was founded as a confectionery distribution firm in 1909 by P. Edward Pearson and his brothers, John and Oscar. Two more brothers, Waldemar and C. Fritz, joined the company several years later. By 1935, W. G. Pearson was president of the firm. The five brothers determined manufacturing would be more profitable than distribution and, in 1912, introduced their first confection, the Nut Goodie.

Pearson's grew and began manufacturing for other companies, including Whitmans and Planters. Pearson's introduced the Salted Nut Roll in 1933, at the height of The Great Depression. The success of the Salted Nut Roll prompted other manufacturers to mimic the confection. Pearson's subsequently changed the roll's name to the Choo Choo Bar, to distinguish the product. The Choo Choo name, however, was not as successful, and the original name was restored with the Pearson's logo more prominently displayed.

By the end of World War II, the Pearson brothers had dropped the distribution aspect of the business. The youngest brother, William Pearson, joined the family business in 1944, as did George Pearson, son of founder P. Edward Pearson. In 1951, Pearson's acquired the Trudeau Candy Company, which brought Mint Patties and the Seven Up bar to Pearson's product line. The company moved to a new manufacturing plant at its current address in 1959. In 1962, Pearson's acquired Milwaukee-based Sperry Candy Company, a company known for its Chicken Dinner Bar. Pearson's, however, sold Sperry Candy to the Schuler Chocolate Factory of Winona, Minnesota five years later.

=== Ownership changes ===
The Pearson family sold the company in 1968 to ITT/Continental Baking, a New York firm. ITT/Continental Baking sold the company to an out-of-state confectionery partnership in 1979. During that time, sales declined due to problems with availability and product changes, such as a wrapper redesign and recipe change of the Nut Goodie.

In 1985, the company was purchased by Larry Hassler and Judith Johnston. The company's previous owners had split up, causing the bank to offer the company in the leveraged buyout. The Nut Goodie's original wrapper and recipe were restored and, despite the loss of a label contract with General Mills to produce Nature Valley granola bars, which accounted for 1.4 million bars daily and 85 percent of the company's total tonnage, Pearson's became profitable again in December 1992. In early 1998, Pearson's acquired the Bun Bar trademark from Clark Bar America. Pearson's introduced Flurries in 2004.

In August 2011, Pearson's was acquired by Brynwood Partners IV, who sold their interest in Pearson's Candy to Spell Capital of Minneapolis, in November 2018.

In 2022, Pearson's was sold to the Annabelle Candy Company which is owned by Promise Holdings.

=== Factory Closure ===
In 2026, it was announced Pearson's was closing their St. Paul Factory.

== Products ==
=== Current products ===
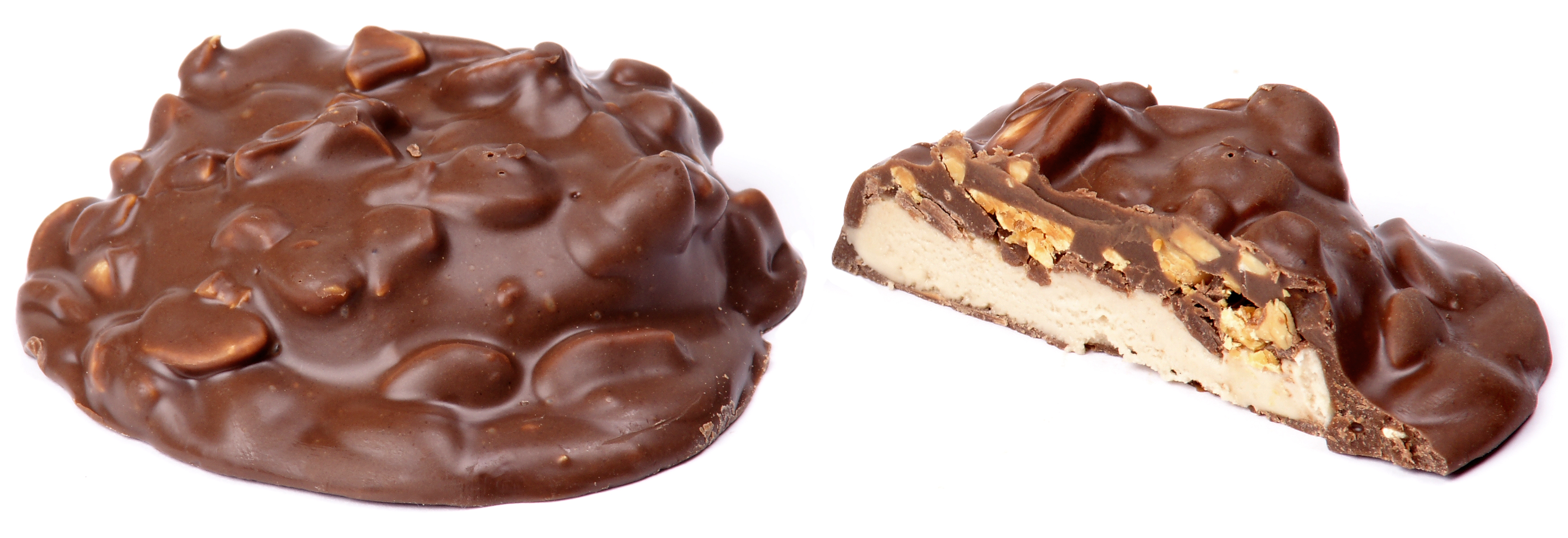
A Pearson's Nut Goodie

Salted Nut Rolls are the company's best selling product, and together with Mint Patties account for approximately 80 percent of the company's sales. Mint Patties are sold nationally and Salted Nut Rolls are available in approximately 60 percent of the company's outlets. In late 2013, Pearson's acquired the Bit-O-Honey brand from Nestle USA, Inc.

Although the company sells its products primarily in the United States, it has ranked among the largest confectionery companies in the world, and as of 2018, was estimated to be the 42nd largest confectionery company in North America by revenue.

In December 2020, Pearson's Candy sold the Bit-O-Honey brand to Spangler Candy Company Pearson's had originally bought Bit-O-Honey from Nestle in 2013.

Pearson's utilizes 200 tons of peanuts, 400 tons of sugar, 100 tons of chocolate and 350 tons of corn syrup per month. Products are produced in the company's 120,000 sq ft (11,000 m^{2}) plant on five production lines. Current products include:

Product	Introduced	Description
Bun Bars	1998	Maple, vanilla or caramel center covered with chocolate and peanuts
Mint Patties	1951	Mint-flavored patty covered with dark chocolate
Nut Goodie	1912	Cluster with a maple-flavored center covered with chocolate and peanuts
Salted Nut Roll	1933	Roll of nougat covered with caramel and salted peanuts

=== Discontinued products ===
==== Seven Up Bar ====
The Seven Up Bar was a candy bar comprising seven different chocolate "pillows", each filled with a different flavor. Flavors changed with the availability and popularity of ingredients, which included, among others, brazil nut, buttercream, butterscotch, caramel, cherry, coconut, fudge, mint, nougat and orange. The high manufacturing costs and trademark issues with a soda manufacturer (The American Bottling Company, today Keurig Dr Pepper), caused the bar to be retired in 1979 , when the company that owned the beverage 7-Up bought the name and took the bar out of production.

==== Chicken Dinner Bar ====
The Chicken Dinner Bar had been a product of the Sperry Candy Company, which was acquired by Pearson's in 1962. The bar, introduced during The Great Depression, was so called in reference to President Herbert Hoover’s promise of “a chicken in every pot”. The bar did not contain chicken or other poultry products, but was, rather, a chocolate-covered nut roll. Pearson's discontinued the bar's production after the acquisition. Early TV commercials sang "Chick - Chick - Chick - Chick - Chicken Dinner" similar to, and in the cadence of a rooster crowing. Sperry even had trucks disguised as chickens deliver the product to stores.

== See also ==
- Big Chocolate
  - Cadbury Schweppes
  - The Hershey Company
  - Mars, Incorporated
  - Nestlé

== Bibliography ==
- Hale, James (2006). The Wonderful Wacky World of Marketingmobiles. Veloce Publishing Ltd. ISBN 1-84584-003-8.
- Kimmerle, Beth (2003). Candy: The Sweet History. Collectors Press, Inc. ISBN 1-888054-83-2.
- Lewis, Matt (2004). Chocolate Bar. Running Press. ISBN 0-7624-1921-0.
