= Balance Bar =

American nutritional energy bar brand

- Product type: Nutritional energy bar
- Current owner: The Carlyle Group
- Produced by: The Balance Bar Company
- Country: United States
- Introduced: 1992
- Markets: United States
- Previous owners: Kraft Foods; Brynwood Partners
- Tagline: "Have You Found Your Balance?"
- Website: Official Balance bar Website

Balance Bar, sometimes styled as balance bar, is the brand name of a nutritional energy bar based on the 40-30-30 dietary principle, that is, a diet containing 40% carbohydrate, 30% protein and 30% dietary fat. The 40-30-30 nutritional philosophy was popularized by Dr. Barry Sears, a biochemist, and later expounded in his Zone diet books.

The product was first released in 1992. Since that time, the product line has expanded to include Balance Bar, Balance Gold, Balance Trail Mix, Balance Plus, Balance CarbWell, Balance Gold Crunch, Balance Outdoor, Balance Organic, Balance 100 Calories, Balance Bare, and 40-30-30 Balance Drink Mix. Balance Bar is a subsidiary of NBTY.

== Company history ==
=== Founding and early years ===
The Balance Bar Company was founded in 1992 by Thomas Davidson and Richard Lamb. Davidson, Lamb and two other investors acquired rights to a bar based on Sears' Zone Diet. The company was originally called Bio Foods Inc. and was located in Santa Barbara, California. Balance Bars were originally sold through natural food stores, and were introduced into mainstream stores in 1996.

=== Kraft acquisition ===
The company's speedy growth caught the attention of Kraft Foods, which purchased the company for $268 million ($19.40 per share) in January 2000 as part of a strategy to expand its product line to natural foods. Earlier that same week, Kraft had announced it would acquire Boca Burger. Kraft paid a 37% premium over Balance Bar's then-current trading price. Analysts cited Balance Bar's agreement to market a line of bars with weight loss firm Jenny Craig, Inc. as a factor that drove up the price. Another factor accounting for the premium may have been that Kraft's purchase was part of a rush by large food manufacturers such as General Mills, PepsiCo and the Adolph Coors Company to snap up well-established natural foods companies such as Cascadian Farm, Mother's Oatmeal and Blue Moon Beer respectively.

At the time, the deal was thought to be a winner for both sides, with Kraft picking up a well-established brand in a high-growth market category, and Balance Bar leveraging Kraft's resources for further growth. However, Balance Bar was "not financially material" to Kraft, a Kraft spokesman later said. In 2008, Kraft posted annual revenues of $42 billion. Balance Bar posted revenues of $127 million, a 7% decline from the previous year. It slipped to third position in the category, with Clif Bar and Nestle's PowerBar surpassing it in sales. The company languished under Kraft, and in December 2009 was purchased for an undisclosed amount by private equity firm Brynwood Partners, a firm known for buying orphan brands from large companies.

In 2012, NBTY acquired Balance Bar.

== See also ==
- List of food companies
- List of NBTY brands
