= The Bountiful Company =

American manufacturer

- Type: Private
- Industry: Retail
- Founded: 1971
- Headquarters: Ronkonkoma, New York, U.S.
- Key people: Paul Sturman, CEO
- Products: Nutritional supplements
- Revenue: ▲$3 billion (2013)
- Owner: Nestlé
- Number of employees: 13,000
- Website: www.bountifulcompany.com

The Bountiful Company is an American dietary supplements company. It is owned by Kohlberg Kravis Roberts, which sold most of the company's brands to Nestlé in 2021.

It was originally known as Nature's Bounty, Inc. but changed its name to NBTY, Inc. in 1995. It then changed its name back to The Nature's Bounty Co. in 2016. It changed to its current name, the Bountiful Company, in January 2021.

== History ==
The company was founded in 1971 by Arthur Rudolph, as a mail order company named Nature's Bounty.

The company was publicly traded until 2010, when the Carlyle Group acquired it for $3.8 billion.

As of 2015, the company reported total sales of $3 billion, with $1.9 billion Consumer Products Group, $891 million Holland & Barrett International and $247 million Direct-to-Consumer. It considered selling the company amid growing interests from China, or an IPO early 2017.

In 2017, the Carlyle Group sold a majority stake in the company to Kohlberg Kravis Roberts.

In 2021, the company was acquired by Nestlé for $5.75 billion.

== Brands ==
The Bountiful Company owns a wide variety of brands including:

- American Health
- Balance Bar
- Best Bar Ever, Inc.
- Body Fortress
- DeTuinen
- Dr. Organic (Organic Doctor in the U.S.)
- Ester-C
- Good 'n Natural
- Home Health
- MET-Rx
- Natural Wealth
- Nature's Bounty
- Osteo Bi-Flex
- Physiologics
- Pure Protein
- Puritan's Pride
- Rexall
- SiSU
- Solgar
- Sundown Naturals

== 2011 Consumer Reports investigation ==
A 2011 Consumer Reports investigation found fish-oil supplements that contained, "total PCBs in amounts that could require warning labels under California’s Proposition 65, a consumer right-to-know law, in one sample of the CVS, GNC, and Sundown products, and in two samples of Nature’s Bounty."
