= Reed's Candy =

Brand of confectionery

Reed's Candy Company
- Industry: Confectionery
- Founded: Chicago, Illinois, U.S. (1893)
- Founder: William Reed; Eugene Reed
- Headquarters: New York City
- Website: iconiccandy.com

Reed's Candy was a range of candies manufactured by the Reed Candy Company in Chicago. Since 2012, four flavors of Reed's hard candies have been manufactured by Iconic Candy Co. of New York City.

== History ==
Reed's candy was produced in the United States for over 100 years by Reed Candy Company. The Reed Candy Company is an American producer of confectionery, which was started by William and Eugene Reed of Chicago. Together with their father, they founded the company in 1893 for the production and sale of butterscotch candies.

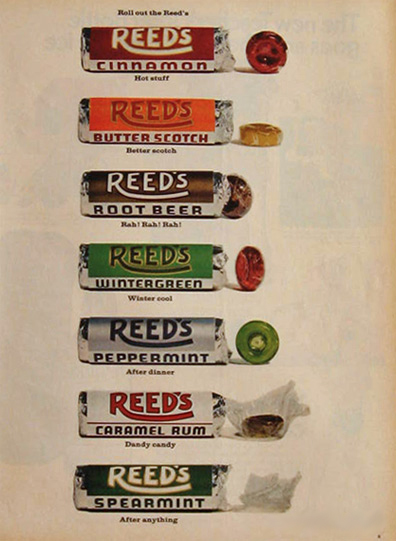
Reed's candy ad from 1968

They expanded the candy line with their top selling product, the hard candy roll. The cooking process consisted of using copper kettles to boil butter, corn syrup and other ingredients to create an individually hard finished candy. Machinery was custom made to allow the product to go from the cooking phase directly into packaging. The pieces were packaged eight to a roll, with a cellophane button-wrapper to protect freshness.

By 1921, the firm had become the largest manufacturer of butterscotch candy in the United States. Other flavors included peppermint, root beer, licorice, cinnamon, spearmint, butter rum, and teaberry.

By 1941, the firm made safety suckers: Paloops, which had a twisted paper rope loop, safer than a stick. By 1941, the firm made The Reed Poll.

On November 21, 1955, the Federal Trade Commission issued a complaint charging the Reed Candy Company with violation of Section 2(d) of the Clayton Antitrust Act of 1914.

In 1962, Lorillard Tobacco Company purchased the Reed Candy Company, and operated it as a subsidiary. When Lorillard was bought by Loews Cineplex Entertainment several years later, the Reed Candy Company became a subsidiary of Loews. In February 1972, Loews Corporation decided to concentrate only in the entertainment industry, and sold the Reed Candy Company to HP Hood. The Reed Candy Company acquired D. L. Clark Company in 1973.

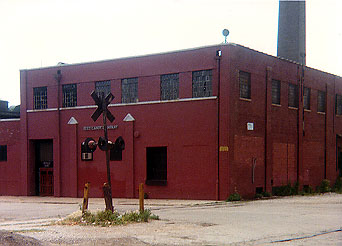
Reed Candy's Chicago plant, at the southeast corner of 1245 West Fletcher Street and North Lakewood Avenue, after it closed, April 1985 by Tom Burke. Note: Reed sign near the entrance facing Fletcher Street. Note: the railroad tracks in the foreground in Lakewood Avenue which were used by Milwaukee Road to make deliveries to Reed of raw ingredients (corn syrup and sugar).

HP Hood divested the Reed Candy Company in 1981, which filed for bankruptcy the next year and shut down. Production resumed in 1983, when the company was purchased by its former president and chairman. In the 1980s, the Reed Candy Company had gum production outsourced in a co-packing arrangement with Amurol Products, a subsidiary of Wrigley Gum. Amurol bought Reed's (but not Clark) in 1989, and they discontinued production in 2006.

Since 2012, and as of the mid-2020s, Iconic Candy Company of New York, a successor in interest of Reed Candy Company of Chicago, IL, produces four original-style Reed's candy rolls in butterscotch, root beer, cinnamon, and peppermint flavors. It also produces 4 oz bags of individually wrapped hard candies in cinnamon, butterscotch, and root beer flavors.
