= Bun Bars =

Chocolate candy bar

The Bun Bar line

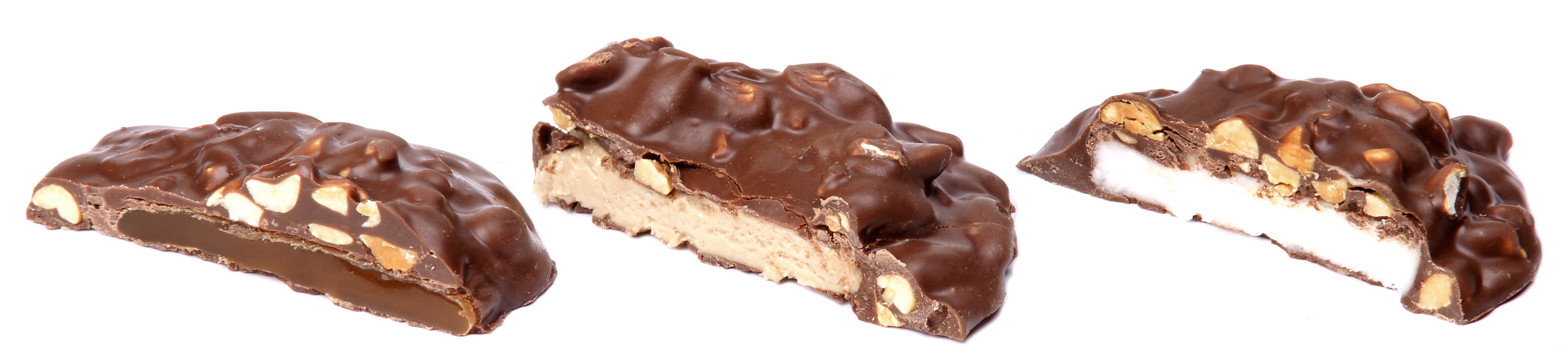
The Bun Bar line split, from left: caramel, maple and vanilla

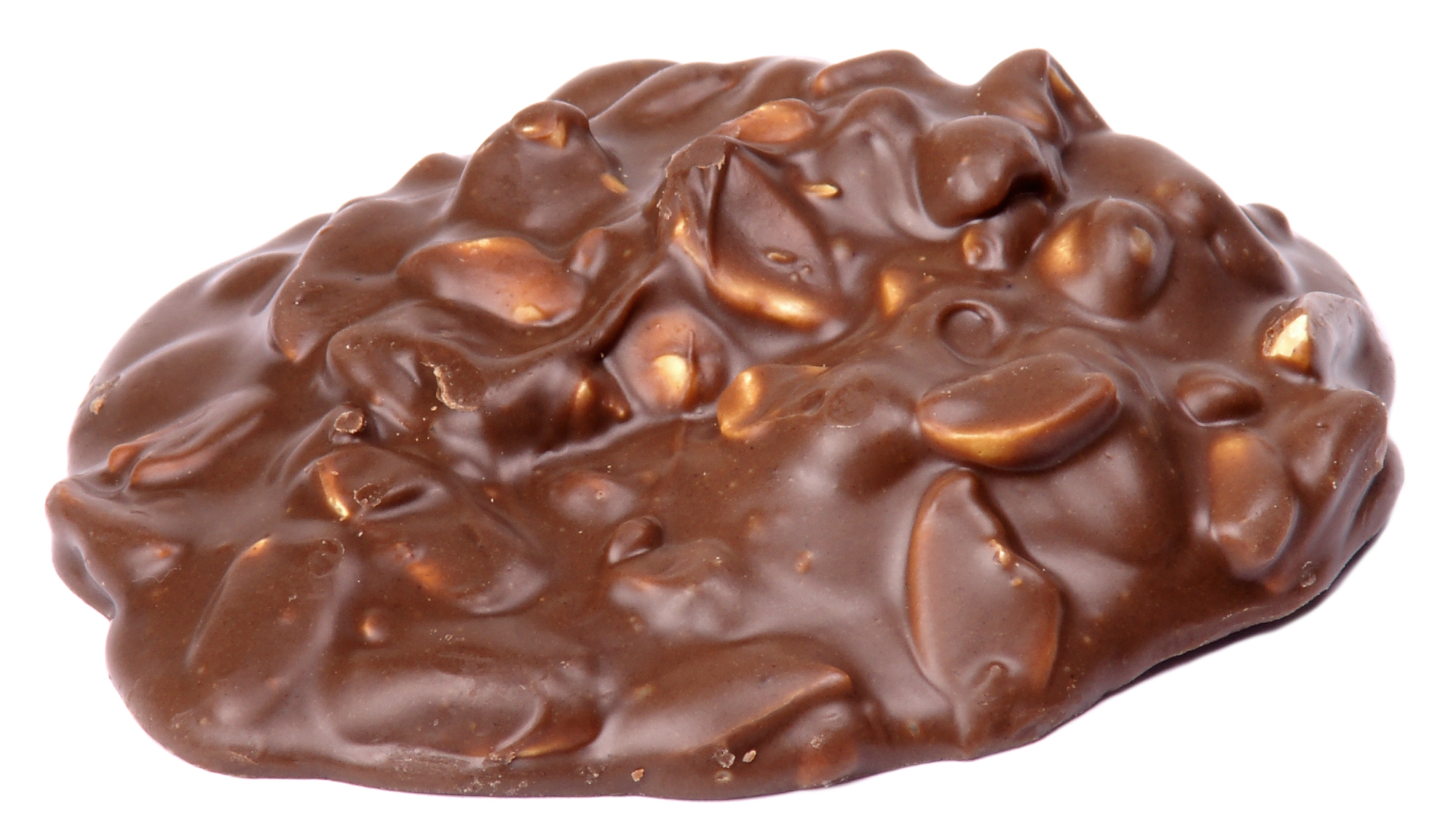
A Bun Bar whole

Bun Bars are a line of candy bars manufactured by Pearson's Candy Company of Saint Paul, Minnesota, and available in the United States. Despite the name, Bun Bars are not bars at all, but actually round and flat, containing a disc made of maple or vanilla-flavored crème, or caramel, coated in milk chocolate and topped with a roasted peanut-chocolate cluster.

The forerunners of Bun Bars were originally created in the 1920s by the Wayne Bun Candy Company in Fort Wayne, Indiana. The Vanilla Cream Bun of 1947 was the first receiving the Bun name. Wayne Candies and their Bun Bars went through a string of corporate owners in the second half of the twentieth century. The first, the Leaf Confectionery subsidiary of W. R. Grace sold Wayne Candies in 1973 to Standard Brands' Curtiss Candy Company. Under Curtiss, they repackaged caramel Bun Bars as the Reggie! Bar in 1978, named for baseball star Reggie Jackson.

When Standard merged with Nabisco in 1981, Wayne Candies was briefly shut down before being sold to German confectioner August Storck KG. Then in 1992 it passed to Pittsburgh Food & Beverage Company. Wayne's sister firm under Pittsburgh Food & Beverage, D. L. Clark Company, marketed another sports-themed caramel variety, the Mario Bun, honoring National Hockey League star, Mario Lemieux. Clark also produced a Reggie! Bar, this time with peanut butter filling.

Wayne Candies went bankrupt and the Fort Wayne facility making Bun Bars permanently closed in the aftermath of the 1995 fraud-induced collapse of Pittsburgh Food & Beverage. The assets of Wayne Candies and Clark were together purchased by the newly formed Clark Bar America, and production of Bun Bars was moved to Clark's suburban-Pittsburgh facility. Clark sold the brand to Pearson's in 1998. Pearson's acquired Bun Bars partially due to the similarities in manufacturing the Bun and their own Nut Goodie. While the two products are very similar, they still have recipe and ingredient differences that make each unique.

Bun Bars have one of three flavored centers (maple, vanilla, or sea salt caramel) covered in unsalted peanuts and milk chocolate. When first bought by Pearson's in 1998, maple and vanilla flavors were available, and later caramel was added to the line-up. In 2015, the caramel flavor was changed to sea salt caramel.
