= Teaberry, West Virginia =

- Unincorporated community
- Location within West Virginia Location within the United States
- Coordinates: 37°46′14″N 80°26′25″W
- Country: United States
- State: West Virginia
- County: Greenbrier
- Elevation: 1,926 ft (587 m)
- Time zone: UTC-5 (Eastern (EST))
  - Summer (DST): UTC-4 (EDT)
- Area codes: 304 & 681
- GNIS feature ID: 1555789

Teaberry is an unincorporated community in Greenbrier County, West Virginia, United States. Teaberry is 2 miles (3.2 km) south of Lewisburg.
