= Boyer (candy company) =

American company

Boyer Candy Company
- Company type: Private
- Industry: Confectionery
- Founded: 1936
- Founders: Bill and Bob Boyer
- Headquarters: Altoona, Pennsylvania, USA
- Key people: Anthony Forgione II (President)
- Products: Chocolate products
- Brands: Mallo Cup; Clark Bar; Smoothies; Clark Cups
- Revenue: US$10 Million (2021)
- Owner: Consolidated Brands
- Number of employees: 500 (2021)
- Website: Website

Boyer Candy Company is an American candy company located in Altoona, Pennsylvania. The factory is located in the downtown district. Boyer Candy is privately owned by Consolidated Brands, which is owned by the Forgione family.

== History ==
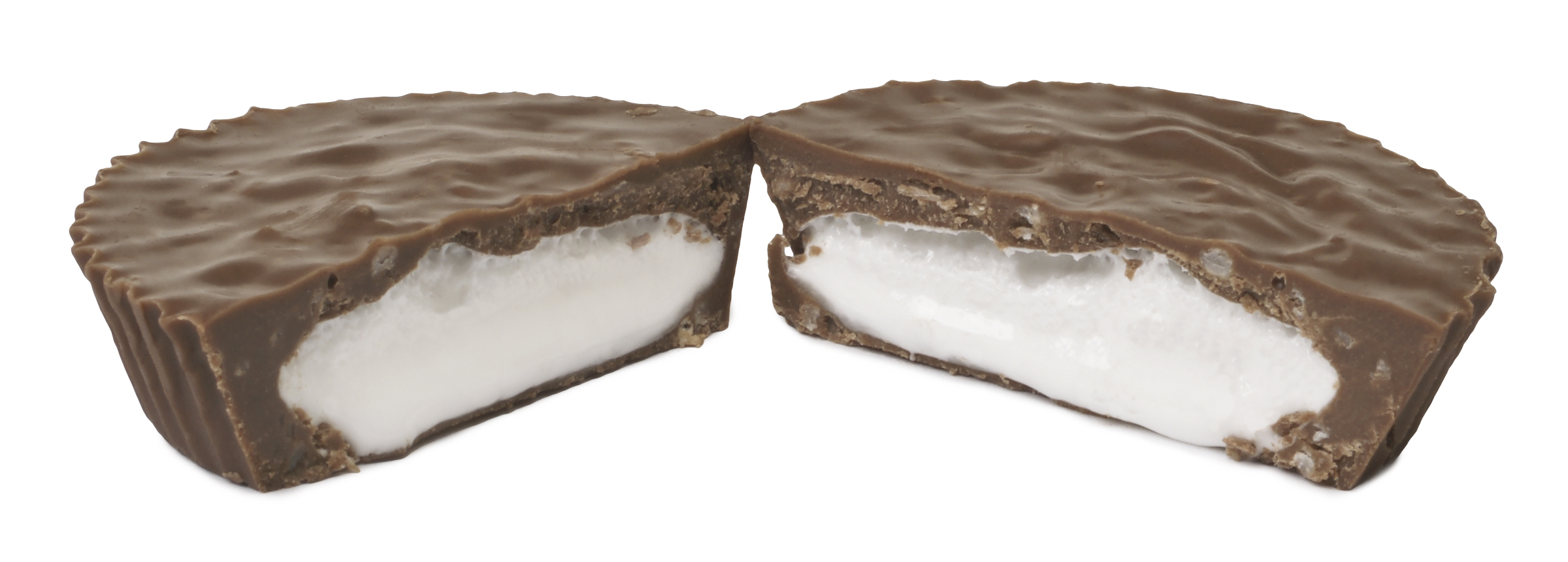
A split Mallo Cup

Boyer was founded during the Great Depression by brothers Bill and Bob Boyer as a means of supplementing their income. The business was originally operated from their own kitchen with their mother and sister hand-wrapping candy as Bill finished making it. Bob sold the candy door to door. Initial products included homemade fudge and nut raisin clusters, but as demand increased, they expanded their offerings and moved production to a new manufacturing facility in 1936. That year, the company's chocolatiers experimented with chocolate covered marshmallow, resulting in Mallo Cups, a cup-shaped candy consisting of a whipped marshmallow creme center covered with chocolate (resembling Reese's Peanut Butter Cups, which were introduced in 1928).

In 1969, Boyer was acquired by American Maize-Products, after Bill and Bob Boyer retired from the company.

In 1970, a new 32,000 square foot warehouse was constructed.

In June 1984, American Maize sold the company to Consolidated Brands, and Consolidated founder Anthony Forgoine became the president of the company. The corporate headquarters were moved from New York to Altoona, PA.

Following the death of Anthony Forgione in 2001, family friend Roy Mollomo became the new president of the company. In 2008, Anthony Forgione II, son of the company's previous owner Anthony Forgione, petitioned the Florida court that put Roy Mollomo in charge of the company. Anthony Forgione II then became the president of the company, with Robert Faith becoming the CEO.

== Boyer products ==
For many years, Boyer candy products have included cardboard wrapper inserts, printed with illustrations of coins which can be saved and redeemed for items from the company's prize catalog. This practice continues today.

=== Candy ===
The Boyer Mallo Cup is a milk chocolate cup that contains a whipped marshmallow center invented in 1936.

Boyer's other products include Smoothies, a cup with a peanut butter center covered with butterscotch confection, and Peanut Butter Cups, with a peanut butter center covered with chocolate. The company has made other cup candies such as Fluffernutter, a mixture of marshmallow and peanut butter covered in chocolate, and a Minty Mallo.

In April 2017, Boyer announced its first new product in 25 years called Jimmie Stix, a blend of pretzels and peanut butter in milk chocolate, in a wrapper similar to the vintage Mallo Cup wrapper. A company press release asserts that the new product "captures the nostalgia of the company's brands while adding in the necessary components to keep with the trends of the industry."

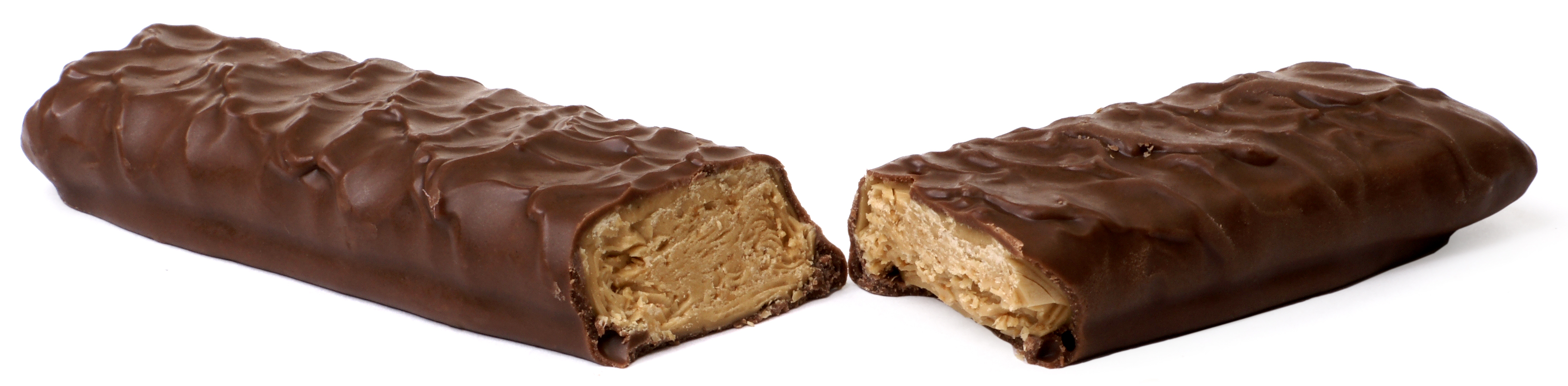
The Clark Bar, acquired by Boyer in 2018

Boyer announced in September 2018 the purchase of the Clark Bar following Necco's bankruptcy, keeping alive a Pennsylvania candy that has been around since 1917. Difficulties in reproducing the original Clark Bar's consistency and shape led to the Clark Cup product, with misshaped bars ground and mixed with peanut butter for use as cup filling. The Clark Bar was relaunched and re-entered the market on February 14, 2020.

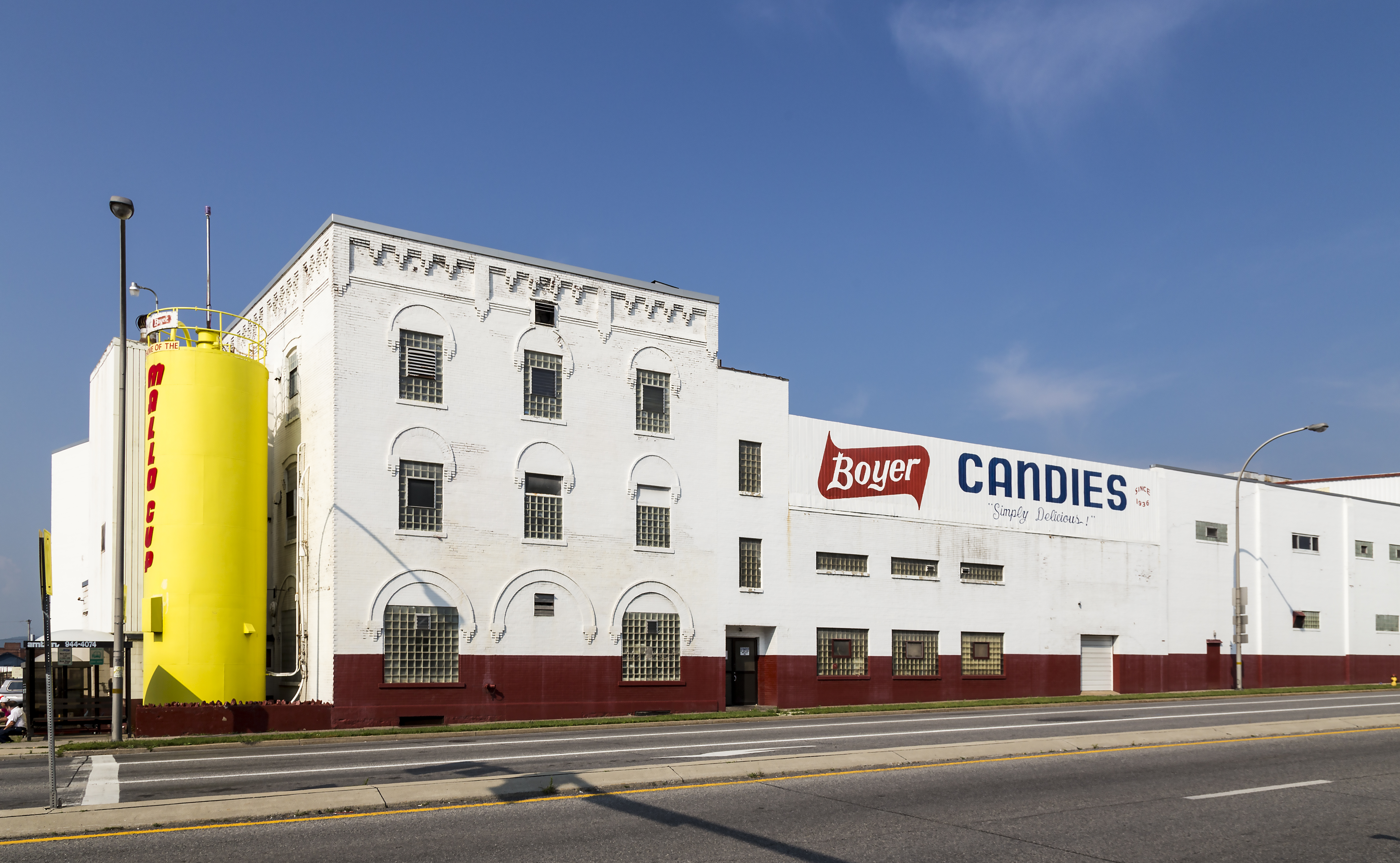
The Boyer Candies factory in Altoona, Pennsylvania

== Company financials ==
In 2016, Boyer was the only US chocolate maker to show a strong growth rate (20.9%), though its overall market share was relatively small compared to companies like Mars and Hershey.
