= Teaberry ice cream =

Ice cream flavor

Teaberry ice cream is an ice cream flavor made with the eastern teaberry fruit. A regional flavor of the U.S. state of Pennsylvania, it has a taste similar to wintergreen and is often pink in color.

== History ==
The teaberry flavor comes from a small, red berry from the plant of the same name which is native to northeastern North America. In addition to being used in ice cream and other treats, it historically flavored chewing gum of the brand Clark's Teaberry, which originated in Pittsburgh during the 1900s. The popularity of the flavor peaked in the 1960s, but has since waned. Today, the availability of teaberry ice cream is almost limited only to Pennsylvania, where it remains popular and can be found in many local independent creameries. Several commercial ice cream brands also sell or have sold this flavor, including the Hershey Creamery Company, Turkey Hill and Yuengling.

Teaberry ice cream has a strong minty taste, akin to wintergreen. Some have likened this ice cream to Pepto-Bismol, with respect to both its pink hue and taste.
