= Nut Goodie =

Chewy snack

Nut Goodie

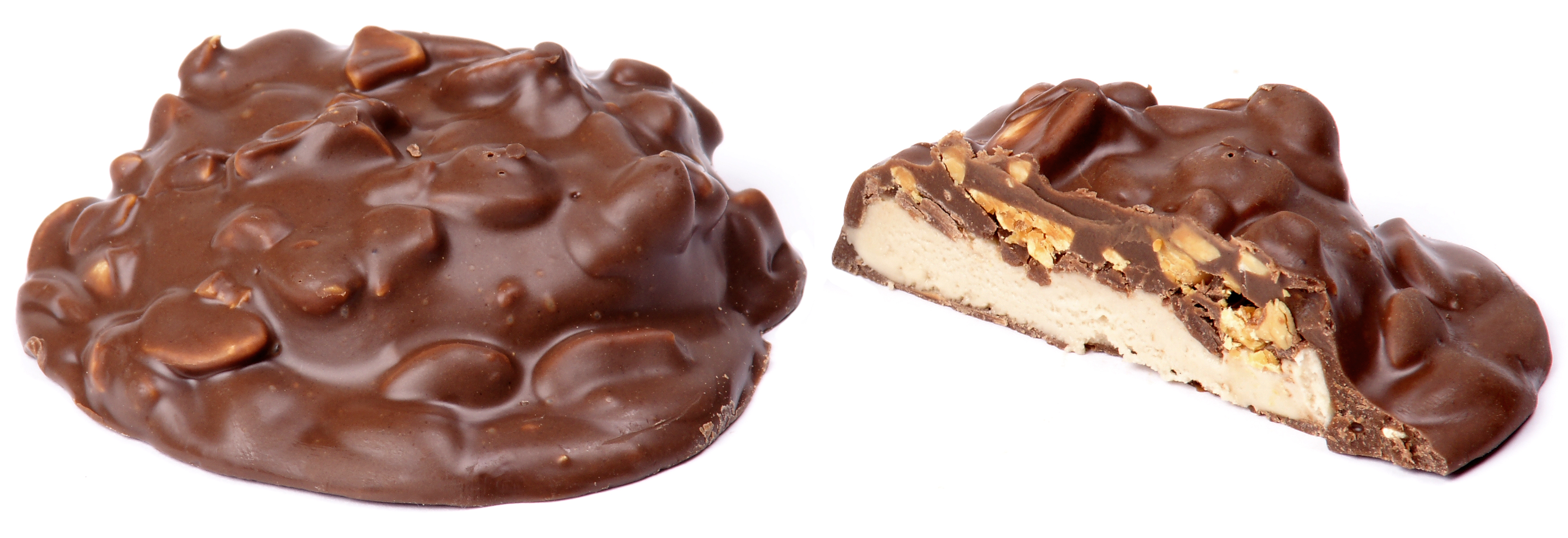
A Nut Goodie whole and split

Nut Goodie is a candy bar manufactured by Pearson's Candy Company of Saint Paul, Minnesota and available in the United States. It is a concoction of chocolate, maple-flavored creme, and peanuts and is distantly related in construction to Pearson's Bun candy bars. The Nut Goodie was once a 2 oz. bar and then shrank to 1.75 oz., which has been its current size for the past 30 years [when?].

The Nut Goodie was introduced in 1912 as one of the first manufactured products of Pearson's Candy Company for the cost of 5¢. It went on to become one of the company's most successful products and is still available today, outlasting other Pearson's candy bars like the Seven-Up Bar. At some point during its history the recipe and wrapper were slightly changed, but restored to the original recipe and wrapper when two Pearson's employees bought the company in 1985.

Bonny Wolf, a weekend food commentator on National Public Radio, stated that "Nut Goodies are to Minnesota what Goldenberg's Peanut Chews are to Pennsylvania. The Nut Goodie is known as "A Minnesota Classic".
