= Pittsburgh Food & Beverage Company =

Defunct holding company in Pennsylvania

- Type: Private
- Industry: Food, beverage and glass
- Founded: 1991 in Pittsburgh, Pennsylvania
- Founder: Michael P. Carlow
- Defunct: 1995
- Fate: Bankruptcy and Embezzlement
- Brands: Clark Bar, Iron City Beer, Bun Bars
- Revenue: $76 million (1994)
- Subsidiaries: City Pride Bakery; D. L. Clark Company; L. E. Smith Glass Company; Pittsburgh Brewing Company; Wayne Candies, Inc.

The Pittsburgh Food & Beverage Company was a holding company created in 1991 by entrepreneur Michael P. Carlow to manage a pair of struggling but iconic companies in Pittsburgh, Pennsylvania. Originally joining the candymaker D. L. Clark Co., maker of the Clark Bar, with the Pittsburgh Brewing Company and their Iron City Beer, it expanded to add further regional businesses: Mount Pleasant, Pennsylvania's L. E. Smith Glass Company, the Fort Wayne, Indiana-based Wayne Candies, Inc., and Pittsburgh's City Pride Bakery. Its 1995 collapse in bankruptcy and the subsequent conviction of Carlow for using a check kiting scheme, said to have defrauded a local bank of more than $31 million, was reported nationally.

== Formation and expansion ==
In 1991, Michael P. Carlow was a 39-year-old entrepreneur who had recently sold a large cement business built by purchasing and consolidating shut-down firms in the region. He also had a history of rejuvenating struggling companies, having done so with two furniture companies. In 1991 he purchased the D. L. Clark Company, which had been founded in Allegheny City, now Pittsburgh's North Side, in 1886. The previous owners, Leaf Candy Company, had retained some Clark products and moved their manufacture to the Chicago area, but had decided to discontinue production of the flagship Clark Bar, for which they had failed to achieve a market outside the region. The approximately $22 million acquisition also included a range of other sweets made at Clark's O'Hara Township (suburban Pittsburgh) manufacturing facility, as well as former Leaf brands, Black Cow and Slo Poke.

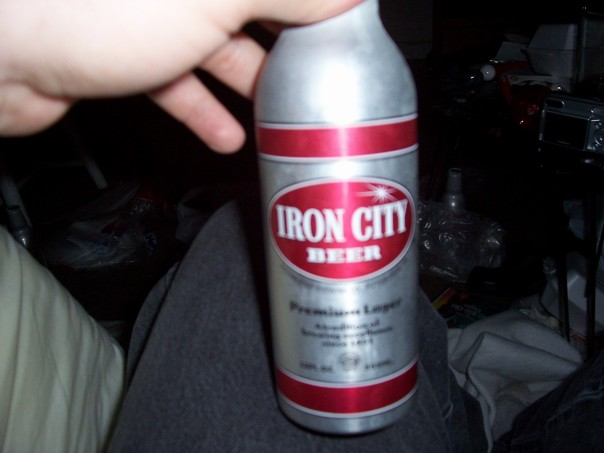
Iron City beer in distinctive space-bottle.

Later that year, Carlow agreed to acquire another struggling beloved regional company, submitting the winning bid for the Pittsburgh Brewing Company, makers of Iron City beer in Pittsburgh's Lawrenceville neighborhood from the 1860s, which also produced Samuel Adams Boston Lager for the Boston Beer Company. This company had been publicly owned before being bought by Australian Alan Bond, through his Bond Corporation Holdings five years before and was integrated into sister-company G. Heileman Brewing Company in 1988, then separated again when Bond unloaded Heileman in 1991. It was being sold as part of the liquidation of the Australian's brewing empire. Carlow created a holding company, Pittsburgh Food & Beverage, to manage Pittsburgh Brewing and D. L. Clark Co., completing the $15 million deal for Pittsburgh Brewing in February 1992. A couple of months later, in April 1992, another acquisition was added to Pittsburgh Food & Beverage, confectioner Wayne Candies of Fort Wayne, Indiana, manufacturer of Bun Bars, purchased from August Storck KG. A fourth business, L. E. Smith Glass Company, of Mount Pleasant, Pennsylvania, which had been purchased by Carlow in 1986, would also be managed by Pittsburgh Food & Beverage. Carlow and his father, Frank, each would own 47.5% of Pittsburgh Food & Beverage Company, with the remaining 5% owned by Larry Ousky.

Carlow continued plans to expand Pittsburgh Food & Beverage, in 1993 making unsuccessful bids for Whitman's Chocolates of Philadelphia and the former corporate parent of Pittsburgh Brewing, La Crosse, Wisconsin's G. Heileman Brewing Company. A successful acquisition in the spring of 1993 added the struggling City Pride Bakery, which was the last operating in the city of Pittsburgh. Clark was reported to have returned to profitability in 1993, with part of the company's turnaround credited to contracts to make products for the Sam's American Choice and Ultra SlimFast brands. Pittsburgh Brewing, at the time the ninth largest in the country, likewise had expanded local market share. For this action in saving and rejuvenating local companies, Carlow was perceived as a 'corporate white knight', and a local magazine called him a "messianic hero". Even when City Pride was shuttered in February 1994 after losing $4 million, locals still considered Carlow's contribution a net gain. Further expansion seemed imminent when in October 1994, Borden announced an agreement to sell Wise Foods, noted for their potato chips, along with Wise's subsidiary, Moore's Quality Snack Foods, to Pittsburgh Food & Beverage. However, this prospective $87.5 million purchase would unmask the fraud that would precipitate the downfall of Pittsburgh Food & Beverage.

== Detection of fraud ==
Carlow had placed a $6 million non-refundable deposit for the purchase of the Borden-held brands, and had arranged financing contingent on the profitability of Clark over the succeeding 6 months, but it was almost immediately evident that Clark, facing shutdowns due to failed deliveries from suppliers whom Carlow had repeatedly put off paying, would fall short, and Carlow's financiers pulled out. This came in spite of an ongoing pattern of check-writing that artificially inflated revenues. As later forensic accounting would reveal, starting in late 1993, Carlow and Ousky had begun a sequence of cascading bad check-writing among his companies intended to forestall payment of the growing debts, give the false impression of increased revenue, and mask the extraction of assets from the company, with each overdraft seemingly paid with a subsequent bad check from the account of another subsidiary. Carlow paid Borden an additional $2 million deposit for a two-month extension of the financing deadline, and began double-shifting the Clark plant, selling the extra production to Karlov International, which the Carlows had formed to export Pittsburgh Food & Beverage's beer and candy to Russia. To pay for this, the cycles of check kiting were ramped up, to the degree that with about $76 million in gross annual income, the companies had written checks worth a combined $560 million, half written in the three months Carlow tried to raise funding for the Wise purchase. Most of these checks passed between different accounts within the same bank, racking up $500,000 in overdraft fees that were paid with additional bad checks. The co-owners were found to have also written and cashed checks to themselves worth millions of dollars.

Pittsburgh Food & Beverage and their Pittsburgh Brewing subsidiary were later found also to have underreported payroll to reduce insurance costs, and to have committed tax fraud for which an employee would be given a 30-month prison sentence. Likewise Social Security and credit union payments for Clark employees had vanished, while there were accusations that the executives had issued credit cards to fictitious managers and used them for personal expenses. Some of the money diverted from the Pittsburgh companies was found to have paid settlements resolving Small Business Administration obligations over similar behavior with previous companies the Carlows had owned, and to pay creditors of a previous kiting scheme.

With the Borden deadline at hand and Carlow still unable to accumulate the necessary money, a routine audit by the company's financial institution, PNC Bank, uncovered the pattern of fraudulent behavior. In all, Carlow was accused of defrauding PNC of $31.5 million (later adjusted to $31.3 million), and, declining Carlow's offer to pay off the debt with another check, PNC alerted the FBI and U. S. Attorneys. Borden immediately pulled out of the prospective sale, retaining the $8 million Carlow had given in earnest money. He was forced by PNC to turn over operation of Pittsburgh Food & Beverage to their nominee to head the company, William A. Brandt, a business turnaround specialist, on February 7. Among other challenges Brandt faced, payroll processing became impossible because Laurel Computer Services, the conglomerate's bookkeeper owned by a Carlow friend, refused to turn over the corporate records.

== Fallout ==
Brandt would soon call Clark a "black hole" and declared that it would have to close if a buyer was not found within days. Adding to Clark's liabilities was a $3 million debt still owed Leaf North America from the time of Carlow's purchase four years earlier. On February 17, the plant closed and most of its 180 workers were dismissed, a skeleton crew remaining to ship their remaining stock. This spurred Leaf to foreclose days later and reclaim the trademarks, accounts, unshipped inventory and equipment, though after unionized workers physically blocked Leaf's attempt to remove the product and equipment, the two sides reached an agreement wherein Leaf was allowed to remove the inventory, but left the equipment while a new buyer for Clark was sought. The same day PNC and two minor creditors petitioned for Pittsburgh Food & Beverage to be placed under Chapter 11 bankruptcy protection.

The case was assigned to U. S. Bankruptcy Court Judge Joseph L. Cosetti, who first had to address a challenge by Michael and Frank Carlow to the role of Brandt. They argued that as minority owner, Michael Carlow had lacked the authority to appoint Brandt and together they put forward their own turnaround expert. However, following a mid-March accounting report, Cosetti concluded that liquidation was the only reasonable outcome, and Brandt was dismissed in favor of a trustee to supervise the company's dismemberment.

After taking bids on all four companies, Clark and Wayne Candies were sold to Pittsburgh businessman James Clister for $3.2 and $1 million, respectively, with almost all of the Clark money going to pay the companies' outstanding loans. Wayne Candies' Fort Wayne factory, with about 50 employees, was shut down and operations were consolidated at Clark's O'Hara Township facility. The newly-formed Clark Bar America would sell the rights to Bun Bars in 1998 to Pearson's, also selling the former Leaf brands, Slo Poke and Brown Cow, to Gilliam Candy Company of Paducah, Kentucky, before itself bankrupting in 1999. Its remaining assets were purchased at auction by Revere, Massachusetts-based Necco. The remaining two Pittsburgh Food & Beverage subsidiaries were also sold. The 110 employee L. E. Smith Glass Co. went to the American Glass Company, Delaware-based but with a Pittsburgh-area owner, for $5.9 million. Keystone Brewing Company, consisting of Pittsburgh businessmen Joseph Piccirilli and James Gehrig, along with Ventura Global Capital Group, would offer $28.5 million for Pittsburgh Brewing, taking on its 325 employees but also $16.8 million assumed debt.

PNC filed a $94 million racketeering lawsuit against Michael Carlow and his father, Frank, in May 1995, but dropped the suit the following year, concluding that the forfeitures accompanying the Chapter 11 bankruptcy and probe by U. S. Attorneys would likely leave nothing to seize were their suit successful. Michael Carlow would plead guilty to embezzlement, conspiracy and tax, wire and bank fraud. In August 1996, he was sentenced to 8 years in prison and ordered to pay $1.4 million in restitution and back taxes. Serving 6 years, it was later alleged that while still in prison and in violation of his plea agreement, he began a similar pattern of shifting assets to stay one step ahead of Federal tax officials' attempts at seizure, and thereby avoid paying further back taxes including an additional $6.4 million from the Pittsburgh Food & Beverage fraud. He was convicted for this behavior in 2013 and sentenced to another 35-month prison term. Frank Carlow received a 91 count indictment for pension, mail and tax fraud, as well as obstruction of justice. He was sentenced in 1998 to 87 months' imprisonment, but died two years later. Several additional Carlow employees faced jail time over the scheme. Fortune Magazine would include their account of the fraud in their 2009 compilation, Scandal! Amazing Tales of Scandals that Shocked the World and Shaped Modern Business.
