= Salted Nut Roll =

Nougat and peanut bar

- An original 1.8oz Salted Nut Roll 24Ct SNR Final Salted Nut Roll
- Type: Candy bar
- Place of origin: United States
- Region or state: Midwestern United States
- Created by: Pearson's Candy Company
- Invented: 1933
- Main ingredients: Nougat, caramel, peanuts

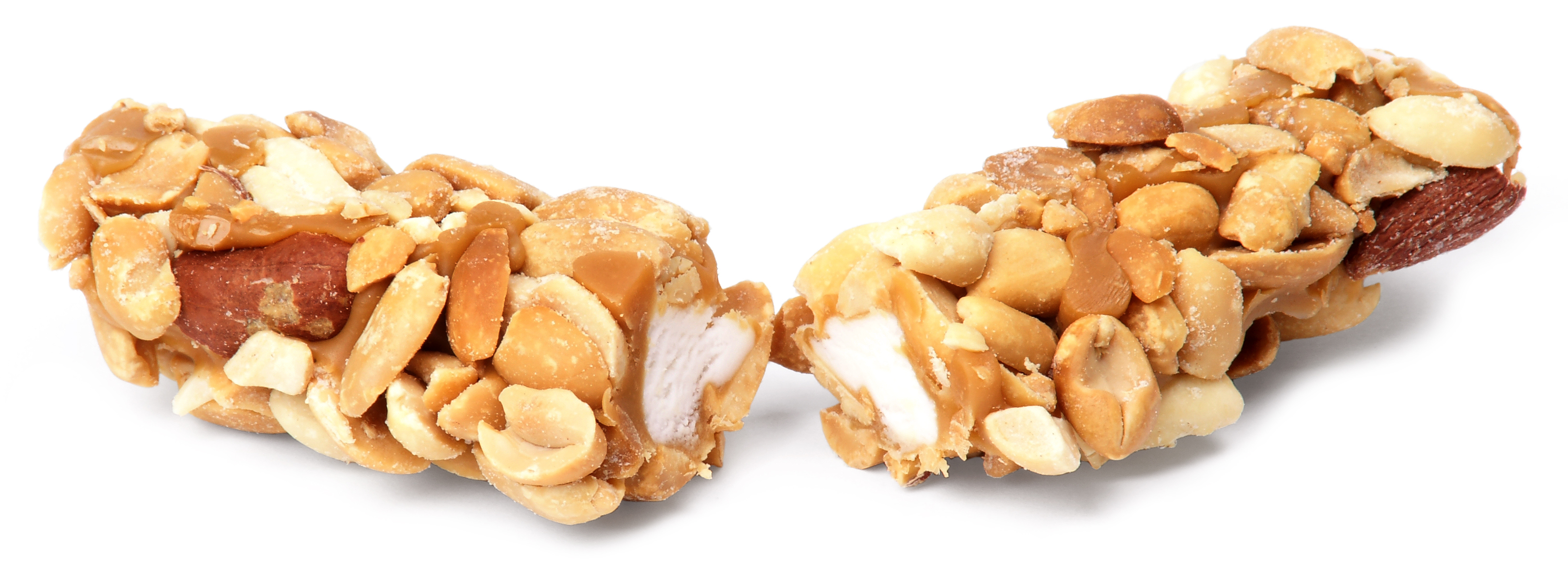
A Salted Nut Roll split

Salted Nut Roll is a candy bar made by the Pearson's Candy Company of Saint Paul, Minnesota and is available in the Midwestern United States.

== Description ==
It has a nougat center that is surrounded in a layer of caramel and then covered with salted Virginia peanuts. Pearson's use of reduced lactose whey makes this confection easier to digest for lactose-sensitive individuals. The Salted Nut Roll is available in a variety of sizes – .5, 1.8, and 3.25 oz. – and has had chocolate-covered limited editions. There have been non-seasonal spin-off products such as the Salted Pecan Roll and a bar which replaced the vanilla nougat with a caramel flavored nougat. Seasonal editions include Spicy, Cinnamon Churro, Apple Pie, and Pumpkin Spice At some point in 2019, Pearson's introduced a 'thin' version of the bar along with other products (Bun, Nut Goodie, etc.) configured in a similar manner that the company manufactures. The company currently offers a peanut butter nougat version - a tie-in with the Skippy brand - and a cinnamon churo version which uses cinnamon roasted peanuts along with a snack mix version of the bar which consists of peanuts, mini caramel cups and vanilla nougat 'drops'.

== History ==
The Salted Nut Roll was introduced by Pearson's during the Great Depression in 1933, a year after the PayDay bar was introduced, and entered into a market that included various types of nut roll candies. After the product's introduction the name was changed to the Choo Choo Bar to be distinguishable among competitors, but was eventually changed back.
