= D. L. Clark Company =

Confectionery manufacturer founded in 1886

- Company type: Private
- Industry: Candy, chewing gum
- Founded: 1886 in Allegheny City, Pennsylvania
- Founder: David L. Clark
- Defunct: 1995
- Fate: Bankrupted
- Successor: Clark Brothers Chewing Gum Co. (1921); Clark Bar America, Inc. (1995)
- Headquarters: Pittsburgh
- Products: Clark Bar; Clark's Teaberry; Zagnut
- Parent: Beatrice Foods; Leaf International; Pittsburgh Food & Beverage

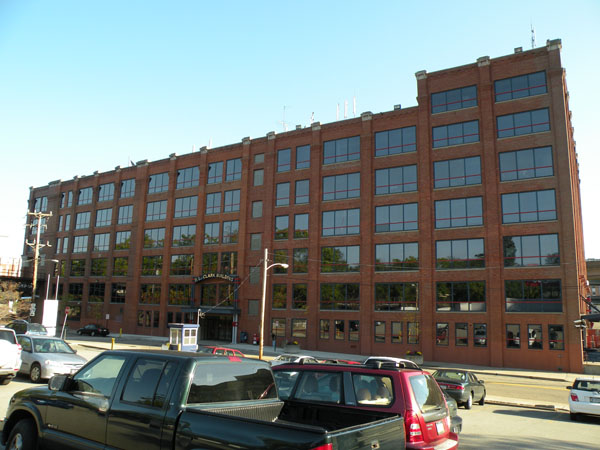
D. L. Clark Building, located at 503 Martindale Street in the North Shore neighborhood of Pittsburgh, Pennsylvania.

The D. L. Clark Company was founded in 1886 in Allegheny, Pennsylvania, now part of Pittsburgh, by David L. Clark (1864–1939), an Irish-born candy salesman. In 1921, Clark Brothers Chewing Gum Company was spun off as a separate corporation. In 1955, when the family-owned D. L. Clark company was sold to Beatrice Foods, they had production facilities in Pittsburgh and Evanston, Illinois. Beatrice sold it in 1983 to Leaf, and they in turn sold Clark in 1991, though Leaf retained the rights to Clark's Zagnut and P. C. Crunchers bars. The new owner, entrepreneur Michael P. Carlow, would operate it under the umbrella of the Pittsburgh Food & Beverage Company.

The Pittsburgh Food and Beverage Company entered bankruptcy in 1995, and many assets from the D. L. Clark Company, such as the rights to the Clark Bar, were sold. The assets of D. L. Clark were purchased by Pittsburgh businessman James Clister for $3.2 million, and operated under the newly formed Clark Bar America, Inc. Following a subsequent bankruptcy, its assets were acquired by Necco (New England Confectionery Company) in 1999 for $4.1 million ($8 million today).

Clark's chewing gum spinoff, renamed Clark Gum Company, was sold in 1931 to Philip Morris, who held it until 1973, when they sold the rights to Clark Gum to Reed's Candy, an HP Hood subsidiary. They would have the gum made through a cooperative arrangement with Amurol, a Wrigley Gum subsidiary. Reed's Candy was sold to Amurol in 1989, but the deal did not include the gum, retained by a newly rechristened Clark Gum Company. Clark's Teaberry gum is currently marketed by First Source, LLC in Buffalo, New York, and made in Mexico.

== Clark products over the years ==
=== Candies ===
- Alligator Eggs
- Banana Caramels
- Black Jack Caramels
- Boomer
- Bun (vanilla, maple and caramel flavors)
- Chocolate Chips
- Chocolate Malted Milk Balls
- Clarconut
- Clark (original)
- Clark Coconut
- Clark Dark
- Clark Light
- Clark's Miami Coconut
- Clark Mint
- Clark's Wintergreen
- Coconut Frosted Creams
- Crispy
- Crunchy
- Fudge Bar
- Honest Square
- Iceland Sandwich
- Mario Bun, named for Mario Lemieux
- Mint Appetizers
- Nutcracker
- Peanut Blossom Kisses
- Peanut Butter Log
- Reggie!
- Sassy
- Sour Cherry Crème
- Sour Grape Crème
- Sour Lemon Crème
- Spanish Chips
- Sunpower
- Wild Cherry Caramels
- Winter Clark
- Zagnut (now made by Hershey's)
- Zig Zag

=== Clark's gum flavors ===
- Cinnamint
- Cinnamon
- Diet Spearmint
- Freshmint
- Fruit Punch
- Peppermint
- Smile Sugar Free (various flavors)
- Sour Cherry
- Sour Lemon
- Sweetwood
- Teaberry
- Tendermint
- Winter Green
