= Clark's Teaberry =

Chewing gum

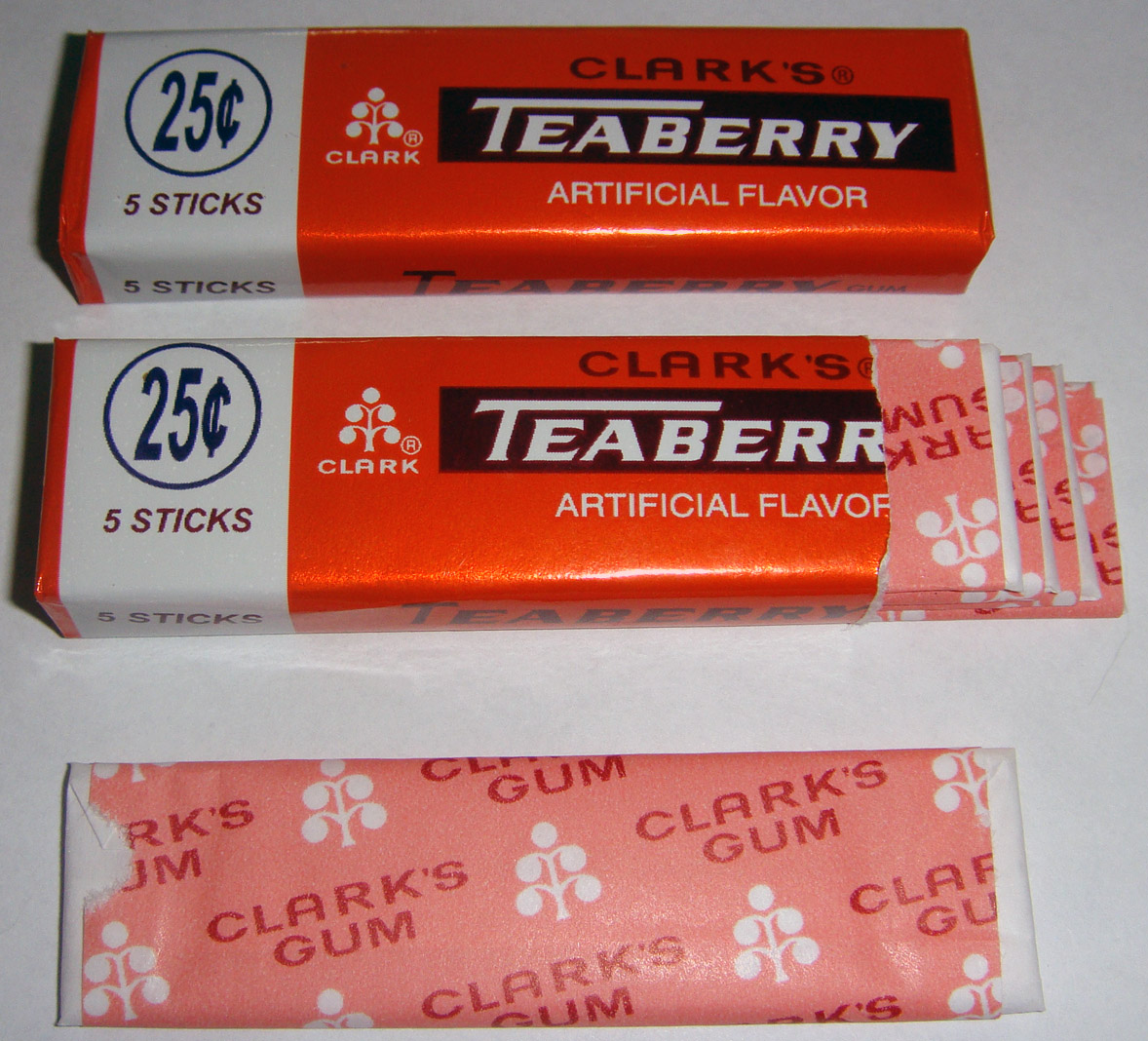

Clark's Teaberry is a brand of chewing gum. The D. L. Clark Company of Pittsburgh's north side purchased the patent for it from Charles Burke, who experimented with various flavors of chewing gum in the basement of 533 McClintock Ave, Pittsburgh, Pennsylvania. Clark's Teaberry Gum is a trademarked brand owned and registered by a family operated confectionary company Iconic Candy, LLC of New Jersey that specializes in the return of “authentic retro” candy, snack and chewing gum brands and products.

The gum dates to 1900 but the popularity of Teaberry peaked in the 1960s. It was additionally popularized when Pelican Films produced a series of commercials using music from Herb Alpert and the Tijuana Brass. Clark liked "The Mexican Shuffle" from the South of the Border album, and commissioned Alpert to rerecord it as "The Teaberry Shuffle".

This traditional gum has a wintergreen-like flavor that is unique to teaberry gum. The gum is a stick gum pink in color, individually wrapped in foil with a paper sleeve in a pink Clark’s logo paper.

== See also ==
- Teaberry ice cream
