= Food Factory =

Canadian television series

- Also known as: Food Factory USA
- Country of origin: Canada
- No. of seasons: 6
- No. of episodes: 128

Production
- Running time: 30 minutes

Original release
- Network: Food Network (Canada)
- Release: 30 August 2012 – 4 February 2017

Food Factory is a Canadian television series produced by Cineflix airing on the Food Network (Canada), and in United States on National Geographic, Quest, and FYI. The show features the industrial production lines of major food companies, mostly in Canada, but also in the United States, and occasionally in other countries. It is co-narrated by Colleen Rusholme and Todd Schick.

== Episodes ==
=== Season 1 (2012) ===
Episode	Title	Segment A	Segment B	Segment C	Segment D
1	Warhol Soup	Campbell's condensed vegetable soup	Razzles	Canadian whisky	Brioche
2	The Big Apple	Spanikopita	Ginger snaps	Tartufo	Apple juice
3	A Griller Thriller	Chewy granola bars	BBQ vegetable medleys	Blue cheese	Rice cakes
4	Pasta the Ice Cream	Ice cream cones	Soda pop	Pasta	Chewing gum
5	Smoking Salmon	Smoked salmon	Yogurt	Ravioli	Fresh garden salad
6	Sweet as Sugar	Refined sugar	Apple danishes	Eggs	Tortillas
7	Crunch Time	Vodka mixers	Italian pizzelle cookies	Buffalo wings	Super caramel crunch cake
8	Whipping It Up	Pureed buttercup soup	Aerosol whipped cream	Lollipops	Crab sticks
9	A Taste of India	Crunchy chips	Fav gulab jamun	Almond biscotti	Tofu
10	In a Jam	Croissants	Rhubarb strawberry jam	Cranberry and orange stuffing	Tomato sauce
11	From Toffee to Coffee	Toffee	Vegan pesto	Coffee	Ice rocket lollipops
12	Pasta the Olives	Stuffed olives	Tortellini	Cranberry pumpkin-seed baguettini	Yogurt drinks
13	Holy Pierogy	Cheesecake	Pierogies	Ice cream sandwiches	Marmalade
14	Flour Power	Cranberry-covered goat cheese	Strawberry shortcake	Flour	Pickled herring
15	Come Fly with Me	Bagels	Airplane food	Sun Chips	Organic vegan carrot cake
16	Full Steam Ahead	Rocket candy	Pilsener beer	Chocolate blueberries	Roast duck
17	Going Crackers	Freezies	Parmesan cheese	Banana chocolate chip bars	Crostini
18	Hot Potato	Potatoes	Gumballs	Hot chocolate	Barbecue sauce
19	Totally Tropical	Roasted peanuts	Mango smoothies	Bocconcini cheese	Vegan brownies
20	Mousse Hunting	Blueberry cream cheese bagels	Pot roast	Spring water	Lemon mousse cakes
21	Like Momma Makes	Frozen pizza	Spreadable butter	Organic mushrooms	Mini quiche Florentine
22	Hitting the Trail	Yogurt	Trail mix	Baby cookies	Veggie burgers
23	Gone Fishing	Rainbow trout	Roasted cashews	Sliced apples	Peameal bacon
24	This Is Toast	Wonder Bread	Pralines	Harira vegan soup	Bagged ice
25	The Cream of the Crop	Milk	Chickpeas	Samosas	Mini eclairs
26	In the Hot House	Tomatoes	Muffins	Breathsavers	Gnocchi

=== Season 2 (2013) ===
Episode	Title	Segment A	Segment B	Segment C	Segment D
1 (27)	All You Cone Eat	Waffle ice cream cones	Doritos	Dark chocolate milk	Kesar ras malai
2 (28)	Salty and Sweet	Donuts	Ice cream bars	Kimchi	Kosher salt
3 (29)	All Bar Naan	Garlic naan	Cheese puffs	Maple cookies	Truffles
4 (30)	Food Fortunes	Salsa	Ice cream sandwiches	Oka cheese	Fortune cookies
5 (31)	Cut the Mustard	Tootsie Rolls	Granola bars	Orange bonbons	Mustard
6 (32)	Spring in Georgia	Frozen yogurt	Brie	Spring rolls	Sweet Georgia Browns
7 (33)	Getting Saucy	Tootsie Pops	Pretzels	Tiramisu	Ketchup
8 (34)	Tikka My Breath Away	Gummy worms	Tacos	Curry	Chocolate crème eggs
9 (35)	From Sugar With Love	Peppermint hard candies	Cheese straws	Mango chutney	Love Hearts
10 (36)	Double Trouble	Ginger beer	Pizza pockets	Double-flavour lollipops	Chocolate toffee nut clusters
11 (37)	Colorful Candy	Mike and Ikes	Turkish Taffy	Arizona iced green tea	Shredded cheese
12 (38)	Use Your Noodle	Instant noodle soup	Barbecue sauce	Marshmallow chocolate cups	Peanut butter chocolate Buckeyes
13 (39)	Chee Cha Sambur	Madras sambar	Moo Moo bars	CheeCha Puffs	Dots
14 (40)	Fancy A Sausage Roll?	Sausage rolls	Peeps	Lollipops	Pita chips
15 (41)	Hill of Beans	Candied pretzels	Cornish pasties	Korean dumplings	Jelly Belly Jelly beans
16 (42)	Welch Rare-Bite	Boston Baked Beans candy	Welch's fruit yogurt snack	Scottish meat pie	Peppermint candy
17 (43)	The Name's Boondi	Chocolate mousse and sponge cake	Boondi	Sugar cookies	Greek spinach twisters
18 (44)	Abba Zaba Doo	Amy's Kitchen burritos	Bacon-fried rice	Maraschino cherries	Abba-Zaba candy bars
19 (45)	The Rocky Road	Dark rye bread	Japanese ginger carrot dressing	Chocolate and vanilla cookies	Rocky road chocolate bars
20 (46)	Over the Rainbow	Rainbow marshmallow squares	Wasabi	Tofurky	Mini chocolate croissants
21 (47)	Put the Kettle On	Meringue cookies	Mediterranean flatbread	Jam-filled oat bars	Kettle chips
22 (48)	Not Tonight Josephine	Pakoras	Napoleons	Jalapeño hummus	Sea-salted caramels
23 (49)	Chip Off the Old Block	Chocolate chip cookies	Eggplant baba ghanoush	Apple strudel	Ranch dressing
24 (50)	Where You Bean?	Cherry cordials	Mulled apple cider	Four-bean medley	Turtle cheesecake
25 (51)	The House That Santa Built	Gingerbread houses	Fruitcake	Belgian chocolate Santas	Eggnog
26 (52)	Yule Love This	Yule logs	Candy canes	Shortbread	Peppermint bark

=== Season 3 (2013–2014) ===
Episode	Title	Segment A	Segment B	Segment C	Segment D
1 (53)	Smell the Coffee	Jawbreakers	Tim Hortons's coffee beans	Empanadas	Cocktail sauce
2 (54)	From Candy to a Baby	Pistachio baklava	Candy buttons	Organic baby food	Feta cheese
3 (55)	Ice Cup of Tea	Ben & Jerry's Cherry Garcia ice cream	Earl Grey tea	Tapenade	Tutti frutti lollipops
4 (56)	Get Fruity	Nitwitz fruit-shaped candy	Popchips	Mighty Malts	Chicken soup
5 (57)	Nuts About Brittle	Peanut brittle	Pigs in a blanket	Montreal-style bagels	Jalebi
6 (58)	Snow and Ice	Chocolate chip cookie dough ice cream	Twisted chocolate mint sticks	Spicy pickled beans	Snowball cookies
7 (59)	A Chocolate Orange	Chicken Bones candy	Pastel de nata egg tart pastries	Garlic cloves	Break-apart chocolate oranges
8 (60)	Sweet and Savory	Miniature Clark Bars	Deviled egg potato salad	Puff pastry cheese bites	Potato chip chocolate bars
9 (61)	Fantastic Flavours	Warheads candies	Faux-meat veggies	Maple-bacon chocolate pods	Sauerkraut
10 (62)	In A Pickle	Pickles	Fizzies	Maple cream chocolates	Bliss Balls
11 (63)	Give It a Whirl	Rainbow swirl lollipops	Hot and sour soup	Chocolate truffles	Scallops
12 (64)	Berry Berry Tasty	Jelly Belly Raspberries & Blackberries	Crab Rangoon	Love Grown Foodsgranola	Breath mints
13 (65)	Fries With a Twist	Curly fries	Red velvet cake	Vegetable pot pie	Caramel-wrapped marshmallows
14 (66)	The Perfect Burger	McDonald's hamburgers	Peppermint ribbon candy	Mexican chocolate discs	Enchiladas
15 (67)	A Taste of Japan	Root beer	Miniature devil's food cakes	Soy sauce	Matzo
16 (68)	What a Hunk	Big Hunk nougat candy bars	Air-popped potato sticks	Jelly Belly gummy bears	Apple chips
17 (69)	Rock Around the Choc	Chocolate rocks	Pretzel nuggets	French's crispy fried onions	Brio chinotto soda
18 (70)	Hot Stuff	Tabasco sauce	Italian ice	Peanuts	Chocolate mousse
19 (71)	A Trip to Dijon	Dijon mustard	Coconut macaroons	Teriyaki sauce	Pirouline creme-filled rolled wafer cookies
20 (72)	Thirst Quencher	Cola	Dannon Greek yogurt	Swiss roll	Pickled beets
21 (73)	Six Into Eight	Sixlets candy	Kettle corn	Italian cabbage rolls	TGI Fridays potato skins
22 (74)	Breakfast in Shred	Shreddies breakfast cereal	Black Forest cake	Alfajores	Tzatziki
23 (75)	Pasta Master	Lasagna	Brownies	Maple caramelized onions	Apple turnovers

=== Season 4 (2014–15) ===
Episode	Title	Segment A	Segment B	Segment C	Segment D	Original air date
1 (69)	Pop Goes the Cake	Caramel				20 September 2014
2 (70)	Staken not Stirred					20 September 2014
3 (71)	Gold Bars					27 September 2014
4 (72)	Pasta Straight Up					27 September 2014
5 (73)	Everyday of Sundae					4 October 2014
6 (74)	Viva Los Churros					4 October 2014
7 (75)	Lights, Camera, Popcorn	Blue Tortilla Chips	Cinnamon Crumbettes	Vegan Chocolate Cookies	Microwave Popcorn	11 October 2014
8 (76)	Fishing for Spuds					11 October 2014
9 (77)	Crepe Escape					18 October 2014
10 (78)	Green with Envy					18 October 2014
11 (79)	My Cup Runneth Over					25 October 2014
12 (80)	Cuckoo for Coconuts	Lindt Chocolate Bars	Nanak Foods' Kaju Katli	Lark Fine Foods' Russian Tea Cakes	Soyummi Foods' Cogo Chai Smoothie	25 October 2014
13 (81)	Pigging Out					1 November 2014
14 (82)	Chocolate Under Wraps	Lindt's Lindor Chocolates	Garden Lites' Vegetable Muffins	Just Born Hot Tamales	John Wm. Macy's CheeseSticks	1 November 2014
15 (83)	Let's Talk Tofurky	Tofurkey	Charmed Bar	Shirley Temple Soda	Brodman's Almonds and Flakes	8 November 2014
16 (84)	Just the Flax	Red Velvet Ice Cream	Pumpkin Spice Granola Bars	Chocolate Almond Butter	Lemon Cookies	8 November 2014
17 (85)	Pepper Party	Peanuts	Chocolate Vegetable Bars	Stuffed Cream Cheese Jalapeños	Montreal Steak Sauce	15 November 2014
18 (86)	Ready For This Jelly	Chocolate Coconut Nainamo Bars	Fruit Ice Bars	Soup Buns	Jelly Candies	15 November 2014
19 (87)	From Argentina With Love	Chicken Pad Thai Kit	Mints	Chimmichurri Sauce	Frozen Banana Pops	22 November 2014
20 (88)	Juiced Up	Orange Juice	Pizza DIY Quit	Jellybeans	Cream Puffs	22 November 2014
21 (89)	Working For Peanuts	Peanut Butter	Eggplant Parmesan	Pistachios	Chocolate bar	29 November 2014
22 (90)	Miso Hungry	Candied Almonds	Bagelwich	Smore Snack Mix	Miso Soup Paste	29 November 2014
23 (91)	Brine Time	Chocolate Chips	Snack Mix	Pickles	Packet Mushroom Soup	6 December 2014
24 (92)	Pipe Dreams	Tomato Sauce	Yoghurt Tubes	Candy Fruit Chews	Tempeh	6 December 2014
25 (93)	Easy As Pie	Rice a Roni	DIY Caesar Salad Kit	Whole Foods Apple Pie	Gluten Free English Muffins	13 December 2014
26 (94)	Red Hot Delight	Frank's Red Hot	Shredded Wheat	Coffee Chocolate	Boiled Eggs	13 December 2014
27 (95)	Midnight Munchies					11 April 2015
28 (96)	Constant Cravings					11 April 2015
29 (97)	Round the Globe					18 April 2015
30 (98)	Over the Rainbow					18 April 2015
31 (99)	Hot Stuff					25 April 2015
32 (100)	Sugar Rush					25 April 2015
33 (101)	Sweet as Honey					12 September 2015
34 (102)	Sunny Side up					12 September 2015
35 (103)	Noodling Around					19 September 2015
36 (104)	Liquid Gold					19 September 2015
37 (105)	Let Them Eat Caviar					3 October 2015
38 (106)	You've Got Kale					3 October 2015
39 (107)	Mint Condition					10 October 2015
40 (108)	Smooth as Butter					10 October 2015

=== Season 5 (2015) ===
Episode	Title	Segment A	Segment B	Segment C	Segment D	Original air date
1 (109)	Red Red Vine					September 5, 2015
2 (110)	Elbow Grease					September 5, 2015
3 (111)	Cut the Cheese					September 26, 2015
4 (112)	Snack Odyssey					September 26, 2015
5 (113)	Puffins N' Cream					October 17, 2015
6 (114)	Butter Up!					October 17, 2015
7 (115)	Easy as ABC					November 7, 2015
8 (116)	Drumroll Please					November 7, 2015
9 (117)	It's Bittersweet					November 14, 2015
10 (118)	Hurry and Ketchup!					November 14, 2015

=== Season 6 (2016–17) ===
Episode	Title	Segment A	Segment B	Segment C	Segment D	Original air date
1 (119)	Backyard BBQ					September 24, 2016
2 (120)	Thanksgiving					October 1, 2016
3 (121)	The Big Game					October 15, 2016
4 (122)	Halloween					October 22, 2016
5 (123)	Love					November 5, 2016
6 (124)	Fiesta Night					November 12, 2016
7 (125)	Movie Night					November 19, 2016
8 (126)	Birthdays	Birthday Cake Ice Cream	Edible Waffle Bowls	Cotton Candy	Chocolate Pinata	November 26, 2016
9 (127)	Winter					December 3, 2016
10 (128)	Valentine's Day					February 4, 2017

== Food Factory USA ==
Between the original program's third and fourth seasons, the first season of Food Factory USA was produced for FYI and featured only U.S. factories. The style of the show, including the theme music, text graphics, and two narrators, is identical to the original three seasons of Food Factory. However, the format is somewhat different, catering to the demands of American programmers by eliminating one of the four segments to make room for more commercials, and putting those commercials in the middle of each of the three remaining segments instead of between them. In addition, each break is preceded by a trivia question related to the segment, whose answer is given following the break (similar to other series such as Pawn Stars). In the spring of 2015, a second season began airing on May 23, two at a time each week as with season four of Food Factory. The only noticeable difference is the use of graphical text in various colors (consistent within each episode), instead of the silvery grey used in all four previous seasons of the two series.

In the FYI telecasts, Food Factory USA also uses only US customary units, instead of the metric system measurements used in the original three Food Factory seasons. Those seasons, as seen on Food Network Canada (as well in the United States as FYI and its predecessor, Bio), used metric measurements in the narration, with the FYI broadcasts also including metric with English conversions in the graphics. As aired in the U.S., the fourth season of Food Factory has no metric units of any kind (narration, graphics, or captions), but the closed captioning still uses Canadian spelling.

== Home Factory ==
Also in May 2015, a spinoff began airing in the U.S. on FYI. Home Factory is nearly identical to the original series, except that its products are non-food items found in and around the home, ranging from towels and brooms to rubber ducks and lawn flamingos.

== See also ==
- How It's Made
