= Sin Parar =

Brand of confectionery and ice cream

Sin Parar or Sem Parar (Non Stop in English) is a line of candy bars and ice cream made by Nestlé. They are available in Peru, Mexico and Brazil (Sem Parar). They are targeted towards teenagers.
