= 1991–92 Football League First Division =

1991–92 season of Football League First Division

Football League First Division
- Season: 1991–92
- Champions: Leeds United; 3rd English title
- Relegated: Luton Town; Notts County; West Ham United
- Champions League: Leeds United
- European Cup Winners' Cup: Liverpool
- UEFA Cup: Manchester United; Sheffield Wednesday
- Matches: 462
- Goals: 1,174 (2.54 per match)
- Top goalscorer: Ian Wright (29 goals)
- Biggest home win: Arsenal 7–1 Sheffield Wednesday (15 February 1992)
- Biggest away win: Sheffield Wednesday 1–6 Leeds United (12 January 1992)
- Highest scoring: Oldham Athletic 3–6 Manchester United (26 December 1991)
- Longest winning run: 6 matches Southampton
- Longest unbeaten run: 17 matches Arsenal
- Longest losing run: 6 matches Norwich City

The 1991–92 Football League First Division was the 93rd edition in Football League First Division existence, and the division's final season as the top flight of English football.

== Overview ==
Leeds United won the last ever league championship before the launch of the Premier League, thanks to the efforts of players such as Gordon Strachan, Lee Chapman, David Batty and Gary McAllister. On 26 April 1992, Leeds beat Sheffield United 3–2 at Bramall Lane, and their title triumph was confirmed with Manchester United's 2–0 defeat to Liverpool at Anfield.

Newly-promoted Sheffield Wednesday finished in third and secured UEFA Cup qualification.

The previous season's defending champions Arsenal slipped to 4th place and never made a serious threat to retain their title. The previous season's runners-up Liverpool slipped to 6th in their first full season under the management of Graeme Souness, although they did win the FA Cup. Liverpool's Merseyside rivals Everton finished a disappointing 12th – a three-place setback on their finish the previous season.

On 25 April 1992, newly-promoted West Ham United were relegated after their 1–0 defeat at Coventry City. This win for Coventry also relegated Notts County – another newly-promoted side – rendering their 2–0 defeat at Manchester City on the same day as academic. The last day of the season saw Luton Town lose their top flight status after 10 seasons. They needed to win at Notts County and for Coventry to lose at Aston Villa, but both teams lost 2-1 and 2–0 respectively.

For much of the season, Southampton's 21-year-old striker Alan Shearer was the target of much media speculation about a move to a leading First Division club. The likes of Liverpool and Manchester United were strongly linked with his signature during the autumn, but Shearer decided to stay put on the south coast before making a decision about his future at the end of the season. Shearer was capped for the senior England side for the first time in February 1992, and scored on his debut. Another English striker who established himself as a top scorer at this level this season was the Sheffield Wednesday striker David Hirst, scoring the goals that helped the Owls win the League Cup and an instant return to the First Division in 1990–91, and finishing among the First Division's leading scorers in 1991–92.

Manchester United's teenage winger Ryan Giggs, who had played twice for the first team the previous season, received plaudits for his outstanding performances and picked up the PFA Young Player of the Year award as well as a League Cup winner's medal, establishing himself as a regular player before his 18th birthday. Other young players who made the headlines this season were Liverpool's teenage winger Steve McManaman and new signing Rob Jones, Aston Villa's Trinidadian striker Dwight Yorke and Nottingham Forest midfielder Roy Keane.

As a wave of new names began to dominate the English game, Tottenham Hotspur's high-scoring striker Gary Lineker announced in November that he would be leaving the club at the end of the season to sign for the Japanese side Grampus Eight, and also confirmed his decision to retire from the England team after the European championships that summer.

=== Personnel and kits ===
(As of May 1992)

| Team | Manager | Captain | Kit manufacturer | Shirt sponsor |
|---|---|---|---|---|
| Arsenal | (Scotland) George Graham | (England) Tony Adams | Adidas | JVC |
| Aston Villa | (England) Ron Atkinson | (England) Stuart Gray | Umbro | Mita Copiers |
| Chelsea | (Scotland) Ian Porterfield | (Republic of Ireland) Andy Townsend | Umbro | Commodore International |
| Coventry City | (England) Terry Butcher | (England) Brian Borrows | Asics | Peugeot |
| Crystal Palace | (England) Steve Coppell | (England) Geoff Thomas | Bukta | Tulip Computers NV |
| Everton | (England) Howard Kendall | (Wales) Kevin Ratcliffe | Umbro | NEC |
| Leeds United | (England) Howard Wilkinson | (Scotland) Gordon Strachan | Umbro | Yorkshire Evening Post |
| Liverpool | (Scotland) Graeme Souness^{a} | (England) Mark Wright | Adidas | Candy |
| Luton Town | (Scotland) Jimmy Ryan | (England) Trevor Peake^{b} | Umbro | Universal Salvage Auctions |
| Manchester City | (England) Peter Reid | (England) Steve Redmond | Umbro | Brother Industries |
| Manchester United | (Scotland) Alex Ferguson | (England) Bryan Robson | Adidas | Sharp |
| Norwich City | (Wales) David Williams (caretaker) | (England) Ian Butterworth | Asics | Asics |
| Nottingham Forest | (England) Brian Clough | (England) Stuart Pearce | Umbro | Shipstones (home), Labatts (away) |
| Notts County | (England) Neil Warnock | (England) Craig Short | Matchwinner | Home Bitter (home), McEwan's Lager (away) |
| Oldham Athletic | (England) Joe Royle | (Republic of Ireland) Mike Milligan | Umbro | Bovis |
| Queens Park Rangers | (England) Gerry Francis | (England) Ray Wilkins | Brooks | Brooks |
| Sheffield United | (England) Dave Bassett | (England) Brian Gayle | Umbro | Laver |
| Sheffield Wednesday | (England) Trevor Francis | (England) Nigel Pearson | Umbro | None (Until December); Mr. Tom (From January) |
| Southampton | (England) Ian Branfoot | (England) Glenn Cockerill | Admiral | Draper Tools |
| Tottenham Hotspur | (Wales) Peter Shreeves | (England) Gary Mabbutt | Umbro | Holsten |
| West Ham United | (England) Billy Bonds | (England) Ian Bishop | Bukta | BAC Windows |
| Wimbledon | (Republic of Ireland) Joe Kinnear | (England) John Scales | Admiral | No sponsor |

a. Souness was absent from his duties after being diagnosed with a heart condition on 8 April 1992. Though Souness officially remained team manager, Ronnie Moran effectively took over the role for the remainder of the season.
b. Trevor Peake is understood to have been team Captain in January but it is unknown when he was appointed.

=== Managerial changes ===
| Team | Outgoing manager | Manner of departure | Date of vacancy | Position in table | Incoming manager | Date of appointment |
|---|---|---|---|---|---|---|
| Aston Villa | (Czechoslovakia) Jozef Vengloš | Mutual consent | 28 May 1991 | Pre-season | (England) Ron Atkinson | 8 June 1991 |
| Queens Park Rangers | (England) Don Howe | Sacked | 31 May 1991 | Pre-season | (England) Gerry Francis | 1 June 1991 |
| Tottenham Hotspur | (England) Terry Venables | Became general manager | 1 June 1991 | Pre-season | (Wales) Peter Shreeves | 1 June 1991 |
| Sheffield Wednesday | (England) Ron Atkinson | Signed by Aston Villa | 8 June 1991 | Pre-season | (England) Trevor Francis | 8 June 1991 |
| Luton Town | (Scotland) Jim Ryan | Sacked | 13 June 1991 | Pre-season | (England) David Pleat | 15 June 1991 |
| Wimbledon | (England) Ray Harford | Resigned | 7 October 1991 | 8th | (England) Peter Withe | 10 October 1991 |
| Coventry City | (England) Terry Butcher | Sacked | 6 January 1992 | 17th | (England) Don Howe | 7 January 1992 |
| Wimbledon | (England) Peter Withe | Sacked | 19 January 1992 | 19th | (Republic of Ireland) Joe Kinnear | 19 January 1992 |
| Norwich City | (England) Dave Stringer | Resigned | 1 May 1992 | 18th | (Wales) David Williams | 1 May 1992 |

== League standings ==
| Pos | Team | Pld | W | D | L | GF | GA | GD | Pts | Qualification or relegation |
|---|---|---|---|---|---|---|---|---|---|---|
| 1 | Leeds United (C) | 42 | 22 | 16 | 4 | 74 | 37 | +37 | 82 | Qualification for the UEFA Champions League first round and qualification for the FA Premier League |
| 2 | Manchester United | 42 | 21 | 15 | 6 | 63 | 33 | +30 | 78 | Qualification for the UEFA Cup first round and qualification for the FA Premier League (Note: Manchester United also won the League Cup – that UEFA Cup qualifying place was passed down to the third-placed League team.) |
| 3 | Sheffield Wednesday | 42 | 21 | 12 | 9 | 62 | 49 | +13 | 75 | Qualification for the UEFA Cup first round and qualification for the FA Premier League |
| 4 | Arsenal | 42 | 19 | 15 | 8 | 81 | 46 | +35 | 72 | Qualification for the FA Premier League |
| 5 | Manchester City | 42 | 20 | 10 | 12 | 61 | 48 | +13 | 70 | Qualification for the FA Premier League |
| 6 | Liverpool | 42 | 16 | 16 | 10 | 47 | 40 | +7 | 64 | Qualification for the European Cup Winners' Cup first round and qualification for the FA Premier League |
| 7 | Aston Villa | 42 | 17 | 9 | 16 | 48 | 44 | +4 | 60 | Qualification for the FA Premier League |
| 8 | Nottingham Forest | 42 | 16 | 11 | 15 | 60 | 58 | +2 | 59 | Qualification for the FA Premier League |
| 9 | Sheffield United | 42 | 16 | 9 | 17 | 65 | 63 | +2 | 57 | Qualification for the FA Premier League |
| 10 | Crystal Palace | 42 | 14 | 15 | 13 | 53 | 61 | −8 | 57 | Qualification for the FA Premier League |
| 11 | Queens Park Rangers | 42 | 12 | 18 | 12 | 48 | 47 | +1 | 54 | Qualification for the FA Premier League |
| 12 | Everton | 42 | 13 | 14 | 15 | 52 | 51 | +1 | 53 | Qualification for the FA Premier League |
| 13 | Wimbledon | 42 | 13 | 14 | 15 | 53 | 53 | 0 | 53 | Qualification for the FA Premier League |
| 14 | Chelsea | 42 | 13 | 14 | 15 | 50 | 60 | −10 | 53 | Qualification for the FA Premier League |
| 15 | Tottenham Hotspur | 42 | 15 | 7 | 20 | 58 | 63 | −5 | 52 | Qualification for the FA Premier League |
| 16 | Southampton | 42 | 14 | 10 | 18 | 39 | 55 | −16 | 52 | Qualification for the FA Premier League |
| 17 | Oldham Athletic | 42 | 14 | 9 | 19 | 63 | 67 | −4 | 51 | Qualification for the FA Premier League |
| 18 | Norwich City | 42 | 11 | 12 | 19 | 47 | 63 | −16 | 45 | Qualification for the FA Premier League |
| 19 | Coventry City | 42 | 11 | 11 | 20 | 35 | 44 | −9 | 44 | Qualification for the FA Premier League |
| 20 | Luton Town (R) | 42 | 10 | 12 | 20 | 38 | 71 | −33 | 42 | Relegation to the First Division (Note: From the 1992–93 season, the first tier became the Premier League, and the second tier, then known as the Second Division, was renamed to the First Division.) |
| 21 | Notts County (R) | 42 | 10 | 10 | 22 | 40 | 62 | −22 | 40 | Relegation to the First Division |
| 22 | West Ham United (R) | 42 | 9 | 11 | 22 | 37 | 59 | −22 | 38 | Relegation to the First Division |

Source: World Football
Rules for classification: 1) Points; 2) Goal difference; 3) Goals scored
(C) Champions; (R) Relegated

== Results ==
| Home \ Away | ARS | AST | CHE | COV | CRY | EVE | LEE | LIV | LUT | MCI | MUN | NWC | NOT | NTC | OLD | QPR | SHU | SHW | SOU | TOT | WHU | WDN |
|---|---|---|---|---|---|---|---|---|---|---|---|---|---|---|---|---|---|---|---|---|---|---|
| Arsenal | | 0–0 | 3–2 | 1–2 | 4–1 | 4–2 | 1–1 | 4–0 | 2–0 | 2–1 | 1–1 | 1–1 | 3–3 | 2–0 | 2–1 | 1–1 | 5–2 | 7–1 | 5–1 | 2–0 | 0–1 | 1–1 |
| Aston Villa | 3–1 | | 3–1 | 2–0 | 0–1 | 0–0 | 1–4 | 1–0 | 4–0 | 3–1 | 0–1 | 1–0 | 3–1 | 1–0 | 1–0 | 0–1 | 1–1 | 0–1 | 2–1 | 0–0 | 3–1 | 2–1 |
| Chelsea | 1–1 | 2–0 | | 0–1 | 1–1 | 2–2 | 0–1 | 2–2 | 4–1 | 1–1 | 1–3 | 0–3 | 1–0 | 2–2 | 4–2 | 2–1 | 1–2 | 0–3 | 1–1 | 2–0 | 2–1 | 2–2 |
| Coventry City | 0–1 | 1–0 | 0–1 | | 1–2 | 0–1 | 0–0 | 0–0 | 5–0 | 0–1 | 0–0 | 0–0 | 0–2 | 1–0 | 1–1 | 2–2 | 3–1 | 0–0 | 2–0 | 1–2 | 1–0 | 0–1 |
| Crystal Palace | 1–4 | 0–0 | 0–0 | 0–1 | | 2–0 | 1–0 | 1–0 | 1–1 | 1–1 | 1–3 | 3–4 | 0–0 | 1–0 | 0–0 | 2–2 | 2–1 | 1–1 | 1–0 | 1–2 | 2–3 | 3–2 |
| Everton | 3–1 | 0–2 | 2–1 | 3–0 | 2–2 | | 1–1 | 1–1 | 1–1 | 1–2 | 0–0 | 1–1 | 1–1 | 1–0 | 2–1 | 0–0 | 0–2 | 0–1 | 0–1 | 3–1 | 4–0 | 2–0 |
| Leeds United | 2–2 | 0–0 | 3–0 | 2–0 | 1–1 | 1–0 | | 1–0 | 2–0 | 3–0 | 1–1 | 1–0 | 1–0 | 3–0 | 1–0 | 2–0 | 4–3 | 1–1 | 3–3 | 1–1 | 0–0 | 5–1 |
| Liverpool | 2–0 | 1–1 | 1–2 | 1–0 | 1–2 | 3–1 | 0–0 | | 2–1 | 2–2 | 2–0 | 2–1 | 2–0 | 4–0 | 2–1 | 1–0 | 2–1 | 1–1 | 0–0 | 2–1 | 1–0 | 2–3 |
| Luton Town | 1–0 | 2–0 | 2–0 | 1–0 | 1–1 | 0–1 | 0–2 | 0–0 | | 2–2 | 1–1 | 2–0 | 2–1 | 1–1 | 2–1 | 0–1 | 2–1 | 2–2 | 2–1 | 0–0 | 0–1 | 2–1 |
| Manchester City | 1–0 | 2–0 | 0–0 | 1–0 | 3–2 | 0–1 | 4–0 | 2–1 | 4–0 | | 0–0 | 2–1 | 2–1 | 2–0 | 1–2 | 2–2 | 3–2 | 0–1 | 0–1 | 1–0 | 2–0 | 0–0 |
| Manchester United | 1–1 | 1–0 | 1–1 | 4–0 | 2–0 | 1–0 | 1–1 | 0–0 | 5–0 | 1–1 | | 3–0 | 1–2 | 2–0 | 1–0 | 1–4 | 2–0 | 1–1 | 1–0 | 3–1 | 2–1 | 0–0 |
| Norwich City | 1–3 | 2–1 | 0–1 | 3–2 | 3–3 | 4–3 | 2–2 | 3–0 | 1–0 | 0–0 | 1–3 | | 0–0 | 0–1 | 1–2 | 0–1 | 2–2 | 1–0 | 2–1 | 0–1 | 2–1 | 1–1 |
| Nottingham Forest | 3–2 | 2–0 | 1–1 | 1–0 | 5–1 | 2–1 | 0–0 | 1–1 | 1–1 | 2–0 | 1–0 | 2–0 | | 1–1 | 3–1 | 1–1 | 2–5 | 0–2 | 1–3 | 1–3 | 2–2 | 4–2 |
| Notts County | 0–1 | 0–0 | 2–0 | 1–0 | 2–3 | 0–0 | 2–4 | 1–2 | 2–1 | 1–3 | 1–1 | 2–2 | 0–4 | | 2–0 | 0–1 | 1–3 | 2–1 | 1–0 | 0–2 | 3–0 | 1–1 |
| Oldham Athletic | 1–1 | 3–2 | 3–0 | 2–1 | 2–3 | 2–2 | 2–0 | 2–3 | 5–1 | 2–5 | 3–6 | 2–2 | 2–1 | 4–3 | | 2–1 | 2–1 | 3–0 | 1–1 | 1–0 | 2–2 | 0–1 |
| Queens Park Rangers | 0–0 | 0–1 | 2–2 | 1–1 | 1–0 | 3–1 | 4–1 | 0–0 | 2–1 | 4–0 | 0–0 | 0–2 | 0–2 | 1–1 | 1–3 | | 1–0 | 1–1 | 2–2 | 1–2 | 0–0 | 1–1 |
| Sheffield United | 1–1 | 2–0 | 0–1 | 0–3 | 1–1 | 2–1 | 2–3 | 2–0 | 1–1 | 4–2 | 1–2 | 1–0 | 4–2 | 1–3 | 2–0 | 0–0 | | 2–0 | 0–2 | 2–0 | 1–1 | 0–0 |
| Sheffield Wednesday | 1–1 | 2–3 | 3–0 | 1–1 | 4–1 | 2–1 | 1–6 | 0–0 | 3–2 | 2–0 | 3–2 | 2–0 | 2–1 | 1–0 | 1–1 | 4–1 | 1–3 | | 2–0 | 0–0 | 2–1 | 2–0 |
| Southampton | 0–4 | 1–1 | 1–0 | 0–0 | 1–0 | 1–2 | 0–4 | 1–1 | 2–1 | 0–3 | 0–1 | 0–0 | 0–1 | 1–1 | 1–0 | 2–1 | 2–4 | 0–1 | | 2–3 | 1–0 | 1–0 |
| Tottenham Hotspur | 1–1 | 2–5 | 1–3 | 4–3 | 0–1 | 3–3 | 1–3 | 1–2 | 4–1 | 0–1 | 1–2 | 3–0 | 1–2 | 2–1 | 0–0 | 2–0 | 0–1 | 0–2 | 1–2 | | 3–0 | 3–2 |
| West Ham United | 0–2 | 3–1 | 1–1 | 0–1 | 0–2 | 0–2 | 1–3 | 0–0 | 0–0 | 1–2 | 1–0 | 4–0 | 3–0 | 0–2 | 1–0 | 2–2 | 1–1 | 1–2 | 0–1 | 2–1 | | 1–1 |
| Wimbledon | 1–3 | 2–0 | 1–2 | 1–1 | 1–1 | 0–0 | 0–0 | 0–0 | 3–0 | 2–1 | 1–2 | 3–1 | 3–0 | 2–0 | 2–1 | 0–1 | 3–0 | 2–1 | 0–1 | 3–5 | 2–0 | |

Legend: Blue = home team win; Yellow = draw; Red = away team win.

== Statistics ==
=== Top scorers ===
| Rank | Player | Club | Goals |
|---|---|---|---|
| 1 | (England) Ian Wright | Crystal Palace/Arsenal | 29 |
| 2 | (England) Gary Lineker | Tottenham Hotspur | 28 |
| 3 | (England) John Fashanu | Wimbledon | 18 |
| 3 | (England) David Hirst | Sheffield Wednesday | 18 |
| 3 | (Scotland) Brian McClair | Manchester United | 18 |
| 3 | (England) David White | Manchester City | 18 |
| 7 | (England) Mark Bright | Crystal Palace | 17 |
| 8 | (England) Lee Chapman | Leeds United | 16 |
| 9 | (England) Peter Beardsley | Everton | 15 |
| 10 | (England) Robbie Earle | Wimbledon | 14 |

=== Hat-tricks ===
| Player | For | Against | Result | Date | Ref |
|---|---|---|---|---|---|
| (England) Carlton Palmer | Sheffield Wednesday | Queens Park Rangers | 4–1 (H) | 31 August 1991 | |
| (England) Peter Beardsley | Everton | Coventry City | 3–0 (H) | 21 September 1991 | |
| (England) Gary Lineker (4) | Tottenham Hotspur | Wimbledon | 5–3 (A) | 21 September 1991 | |
| (England) Ian Wright | Arsenal | Southampton | 4–0 (A) | 28 September 1991 | |
| (England) Tony Cottee | Everton | Tottenham Hotspur | 3–1 (H) | 5 October 1991 | |
| (England) Ian Wright (4) | Arsenal | Everton | 4–2 (H) | 21 December 1991 | |
| (England) Dennis Bailey | Queens Park Rangers | Manchester United | 4–1 (A) | 1 January 1992 | |
| (England) Lee Chapman | Leeds United | Sheffield Wednesday | 6–1 (A) | 12 January 1992 | |
| (England) Lee Chapman | Leeds United | Wimbledon | 5–1 (H) | 14 March 1992 | |
| (England) Darren Beckford | Norwich City | Everton | 4–3 (H) | 21 March 1992 | |
| (Scotland) Gordon Durie | Tottenham Hotspur | Coventry City | 4–3 (H) | 28 March 1992 | |
| (England) Gary Lineker | Tottenham Hotspur | West Ham United | 3–0 (H) | 1 April 1992 | |
| (England) Paul Merson | Arsenal | Crystal Palace | 4–1 (H) | 11 April 1992 | |
| (Scotland) Graeme Sharp (4) | Oldham Athletic | Luton Town | 5–1 (H) | 11 April 1992 | |
| (England) David White | Manchester City | Oldham Athletic | 5–2 (A) | 2 May 1992 | |
| (England) Ian Wright | Arsenal | Southampton | 5–1 (H) | 2 May 1992 | |
| (Scotland) Frank McAvennie | West Ham United | Nottingham Forest | 3–0 (H) | 2 May 1992 | |

Note: (H) – Home; (A) – Away

== Awards ==
=== Annual awards ===
| Award | Winner | Club |
|---|---|---|
| PFA Players' Player of the Year | (England) Gary Pallister | Manchester United |
| PFA Young Player of the Year | (Wales) Ryan Giggs | Manchester United |
| FWA Footballer of the Year | (England) Gary Lineker | Tottenham Hotspur |

PFA Team of the Year
| Goalkeeper | (England) Tony Coton (Manchester City) | | | |
| Defenders | (England) Rob Jones (Liverpool) | (England) Gary Pallister (Manchester United) | (England) Des Walker (Nottingham Forest) | (England) Stuart Pearce (Nottingham Forest) |
| Midfielders | (Republic of Ireland) Ray Houghton (Liverpool) | | (Scotland) Gary McAllister (Leeds United) | (England) Andy Townsend (Chelsea) |
| Forwards | (England) Gary Lineker (Tottenham Hotspur) | | (England) Alan Shearer (Southampton) | (Wales) Mark Hughes (Manchester United) |

== Attendances ==
| No. | Club | Matches | Total attendance | Average |
|---|---|---|---|---|
| 1 | Manchester United | 21 | 944,678 | 44,985 |
| 2 | Liverpool | 21 | 733,769 | 34,941 |
| 3 | Arsenal | 21 | 669,915 | 31,901 |
| 4 | Sheffield Wednesday | 21 | 621,140 | 29,578 |
| 5 | Leeds United | 21 | 619,349 | 29,493 |
| 6 | Tottenham Hotspur | 21 | 582,978 | 27,761 |
| 7 | Manchester City | 21 | 581,451 | 27,688 |
| 8 | Aston Villa | 21 | 521,039 | 24,811 |
| 9 | Nottingham Forest | 21 | 498,138 | 23,721 |
| 10 | Everton | 21 | 485,954 | 23,141 |
| 11 | Sheffield United | 21 | 462,468 | 22,022 |
| 12 | West Ham United | 21 | 447,024 | 21,287 |
| 13 | Chelsea | 21 | 394,366 | 18,779 |
| 14 | Crystal Palace | 21 | 369,644 | 17,602 |
| 15 | Oldham Athletic | 21 | 316,825 | 15,087 |
| 16 | Southampton | 21 | 312,097 | 14,862 |
| 17 | Coventry City | 21 | 291,884 | 13,899 |
| 18 | Norwich City | 21 | 290,918 | 13,853 |
| 19 | Queens Park Rangers | 21 | 285,783 | 13,609 |
| 20 | Notts County | 21 | 233,828 | 11,135 |
| 21 | Luton Town | 21 | 204,822 | 9,753 |
| 22 | Wimbledon | 21 | 148,181 | 7,056 |
