= Wazoo =

Wazoo may refer to:

- The Grand Wazoo, 1972 album by Frank Zappa
- Wazoo (album), 2007 live album by Frank Zappa
- Wazoo (candy), candy bar made by Topps incorporated
- WaZOO (Warp Zillion Opus-to-Opus), the session layer protocol for FidoNet
- Wazoo Sports Network, a local sports channel serving Kentucky and southern Indiana

== See also ==
- Wazzo
- Wazzu
- Wazu (disambiguation)
