= Cardinet Candy Company =

American confectionery company

- Founded: 1909
- Founder: Emile H. Cardinet
- Defunct: 1978
- Fate: Acquired by Annabelle Candy Company
- Headquarters: Oakland, California, United States

The Cardinet Candy Company was a maker of confections in Oakland, California. Its most famous product was the U-No Bar.

== Company History ==
The company was founded in 1909 by Emile H. Cardinet to produce his invention, the U-No Bar.

In 1978, the company was acquired by the Annabelle Candy Company located in Hayward, California.
