= Abba-Zaba =

Candy bar

Abba-Zaba bar

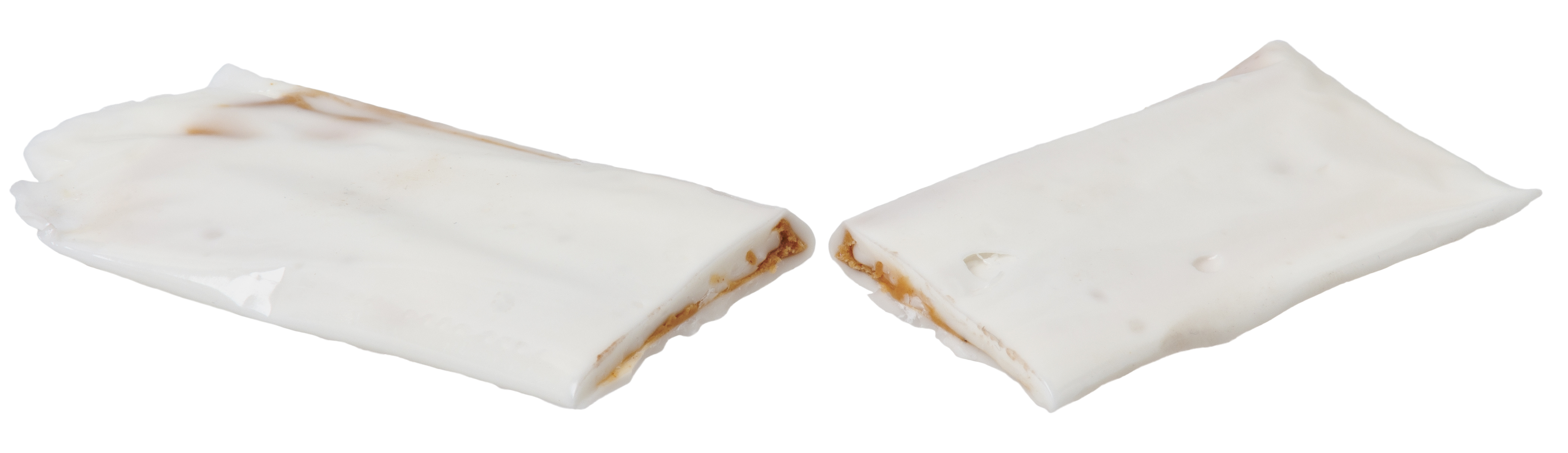
A split Abba-Zaba

Abba-Zaba is a taffy candy bar with peanut butter center, made by the Annabelle Candy Company in Hayward, California.

== History ==
According to the Candy Wrapper Museum, the first Abba Zaba bars were manufactured in 1922 by Colby and McDermott. Before Annabelle Candy Co. started manufacturing Abba-Zaba, early packaging featured culturally insensitive cartoon imagery. The bar was later manufactured by the Cardinet Candy Co. along with U-No Bar. Annabelle Candy purchased the Cardinet Candy Co. in 1978. Annabelle now manufactures both candy bars in addition to others.

Abba-Zaba bars can be found almost exclusively west of the Rockies. The wrapper features a yellow and black checkerboard "taxi" pattern since the 1950s.

In 2005, Annabelle introduced an apple-flavored taffy variant of Abba-Zaba.

== In popular culture ==
Music

- Fenix TX included a song entitled "Abba Zabba" on their 2001 second album Lechuza.
- Captain Beefheart & His Magic Band has a song named after the candy on their 1967 album Safe as Milk.
- Abba-Zaba is mentioned in the lyrics of the 1999 Tom Waits song Chocolate Jesus.

Film

- Abba-Zaba bars are featured prominently in the 1998 Dave Chappelle comedy film Half Baked.

Celebrities

- Actor John Wayne had a sweet tooth and Abba-Zaba bars were his favorite candy.
- Actress and TV host Tiffani Thiessen counts the candy bars among her favorite snacks on set while filming episodes of Saved by the Bell.

== Other sources ==
- Pacyniak, Bernard (September 2004). "Sweet on Annabelle". Candy Industry Magazine. 169 (9): 18–25. ISSN 0745-1032.
