= Pizzo, Calabria =

Pizzo U Pizzu (Sicilian)
- Comune
- Comune di Pizzo
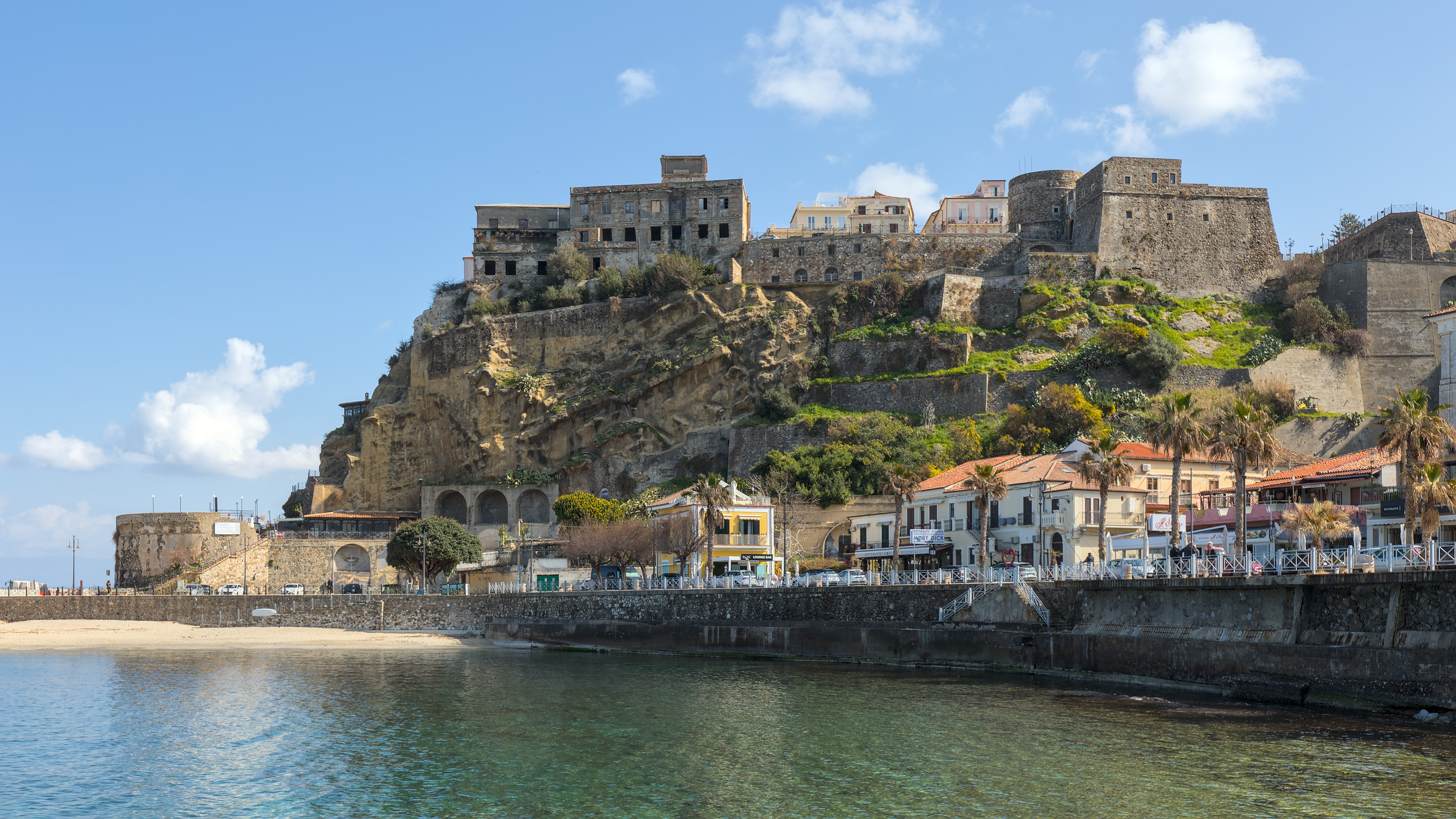
- The old town, on a rocky outcrop over the sea.

- Coat of arms

- Location within Italy Location within Calabria
- Coordinates: 38°44′N 16°10′E
- Country: Italy
- Region: Calabria
- Province: Vibo Valentia (VV)

Area
  - Total: 22.89 km^{2} (8.84 sq mi)
- Elevation: 44 m (144 ft)

Population (2026)
  - Total: 8,668
  - Density: 378.7/km^{2} (980.8/sq mi)
- Demonym(s): Napetini; Pizzitani
- Time zone: UTC+1 (CET)
  - Summer (DST): UTC+2 (CEST)
- Postal code: 89812
- Dialing code: 0963
- ISTAT code: 102027
- Patron saint: San Giorgio
- Saint day: 23 April
- Website: Official website

Pizzo (Calabrian: U Pizzu), also called Pizzo Calabro, is a seaport town and comune (municipality) in the province of Vibo Valentia in the region of Calabria in southern Italy, situated on a steep cliff overlooking the Gulf of Saint Euphemia. It has 8,668 inhabitants.

Fishing is one of the main activities, including that of tuna and coral.

== History ==
As with many other places in Calabria, Pizzo claims ancient origins. The town may have been founded by colonists from an unknown site in ancient Magna Grecia, but there is currently no documentary or archeological evidence to support this. Consequently, the history of Pizzo begins in 1300 when the existence of a community of Basilian monks, a fort, and a fishing village is documented . The name Pizzo (translated either as bird's beak or projecting point) fits perfectly with the tuffa promontory that juts out into the sea near the mouth of the river Angitola.

For centuries tuna was trapped in the beaches around Pizzo, especially in the months of May and June. Despite fading in importance over time this activity continued until the 1970s in the Centofontane area, where nets were spread to corral tuna from offshore. Ruins of the activity remain. The activity is now banned. The Piedigrotta and Prangi areas include some sea caves, and "the cave of the Saracen", although largely eroded today, was supposedly used by Saracen pirates to store booty and people captured during their raids along the coast of Calabria.

The former King of Naples Joachim Murat, who was the brother-in-law of Napoleon, was imprisoned for several days in the town's Aragonese castle and then sentenced to death. He was executed by firing squad on October 13, 1815, in the main hall of the castle and was possibly buried in the church of San Giorgio. Paradoxically, the castle is now called Castello Murat. Inside the castle is the Provincial Museum Murat.

In 1783 the town was almost destroyed by an earthquake, and it suffered some damage from the same cause in 1905.

== Climate ==
Climate data for Pizzo, Calabria, Italy, 1981−2010 normals, (Note: Mean monthly maxima and minima (i.e. the highest and lowest temperature readings during an entire month or year) calculated based on data at said location from 1981 to 2010.) extremes 1895−present (Note: Official records for Pizzo were kept at the from September 1895 to November 1900, the Pizzo COOP from December 1900 to May 1911, the Weather Bureau Office from June 1911 to February 1937, at various locations in and around the city from March 1937 to July 1942, and at Pizzo Int'l since August 1942. For more information, see ThreadEx.)
| Month | Jan | Feb | Mar | Apr | May | Jun | Jul | Aug | Sep | Oct | Nov | Dec | Year |
|---|---|---|---|---|---|---|---|---|---|---|---|---|---|
| Mean daily maximum °F | 57 | 57 | 61 | 64 | 72 | 79 | 82 | 84 | 79 | 73 | 66 | 59 | 69 |
| Mean daily minimum °F | 43 | 43 | 46 | 52 | 57 | 64 | 68 | 68 | 63 | 57 | 50 | 45 | 55 |
| Mean daily maximum °C | 14 | 14 | 16 | 18 | 22 | 26 | 28 | 29 | 26 | 23 | 19 | 15 | 21 |
| Mean daily minimum °C | 6 | 6 | 8 | 11 | 14 | 18 | 20 | 20 | 17 | 14 | 10 | 7 | 13 |
Source: NOAA (relative humidity and sun 1961–1990), The Weather Channel

== Demographics ==
Historical population
| Year | Pop. | ±% |
|---|---|---|
| 1861 | 7,703 | — |
| 1871 | 8,500 | +10.3% |
| 1881 | 8,086 | −4.9% |
| 1901 | 9,358 | +15.7% |
| 1911 | 8,072 | −13.7% |
| 1921 | 7,888 | −2.3% |
| 1931 | 7,755 | −1.7% |
| 1936 | 8,286 | +6.8% |
| 1951 | 9,498 | +14.6% |
| 1961 | 9,560 | +0.7% |
| 1971 | 8,626 | −9.8% |
| 1981 | 9,011 | +4.5% |
| 1991 | 8,512 | −5.5% |
| 2001 | 8,602 | +1.1% |
| 2011 | 8,885 | +3.3% |
| 2021 | 8,878 | −0.1% |
Source: ISTAT

As of 2026, the population is 8,668, of which 49.1% are male, and 50.9% are female. Minors make up 14.1% of the population, and seniors make up 25.7%.

=== Immigration ===
As of 2025, immigrants make up 8.8% of the population. The 5 largest foreign countries of birth are Bulgaria, Ukraine, Romania, Russia, and Bangladesh.

== Main sights ==
It has an old castle, built by the Aragonese in the 15th century, in which Joachim Murat, ex-king of Naples, was shot on October 13, 1815.

Other sights include the Baroque church of St. George (1632) and the cave church of Piedigrotta (17th century)

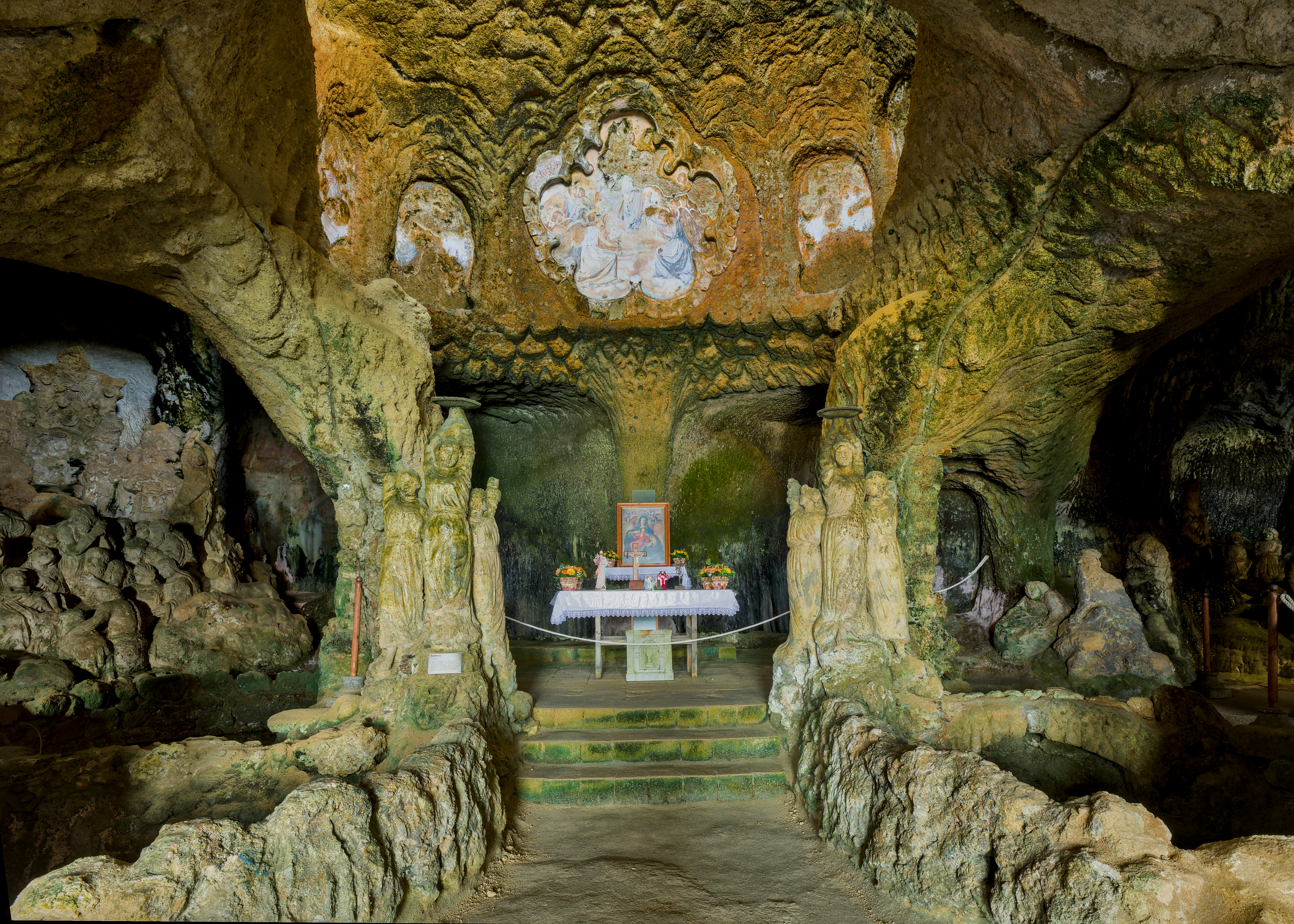
Interior of the cave church of Piedigrotta.

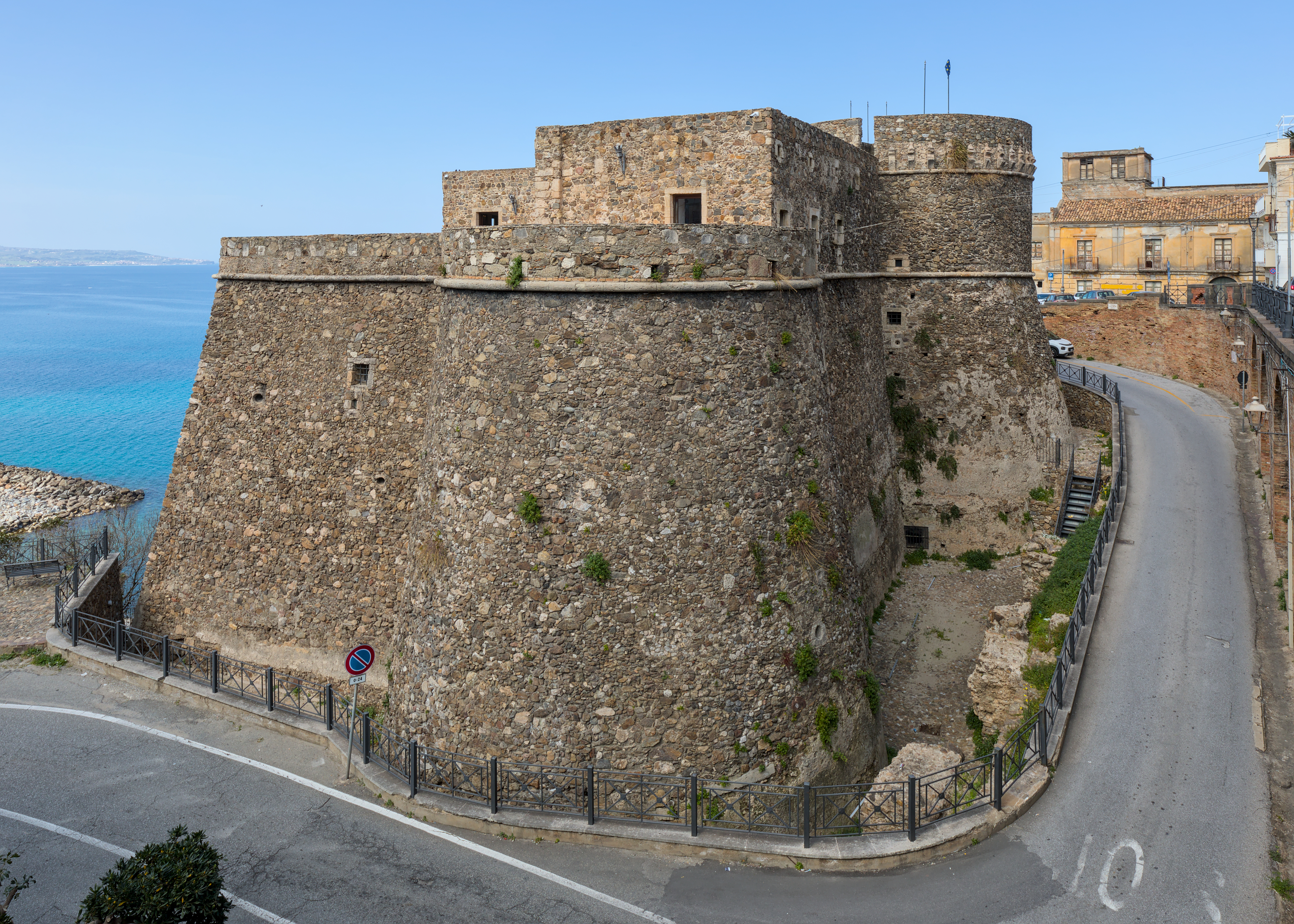
The castle.

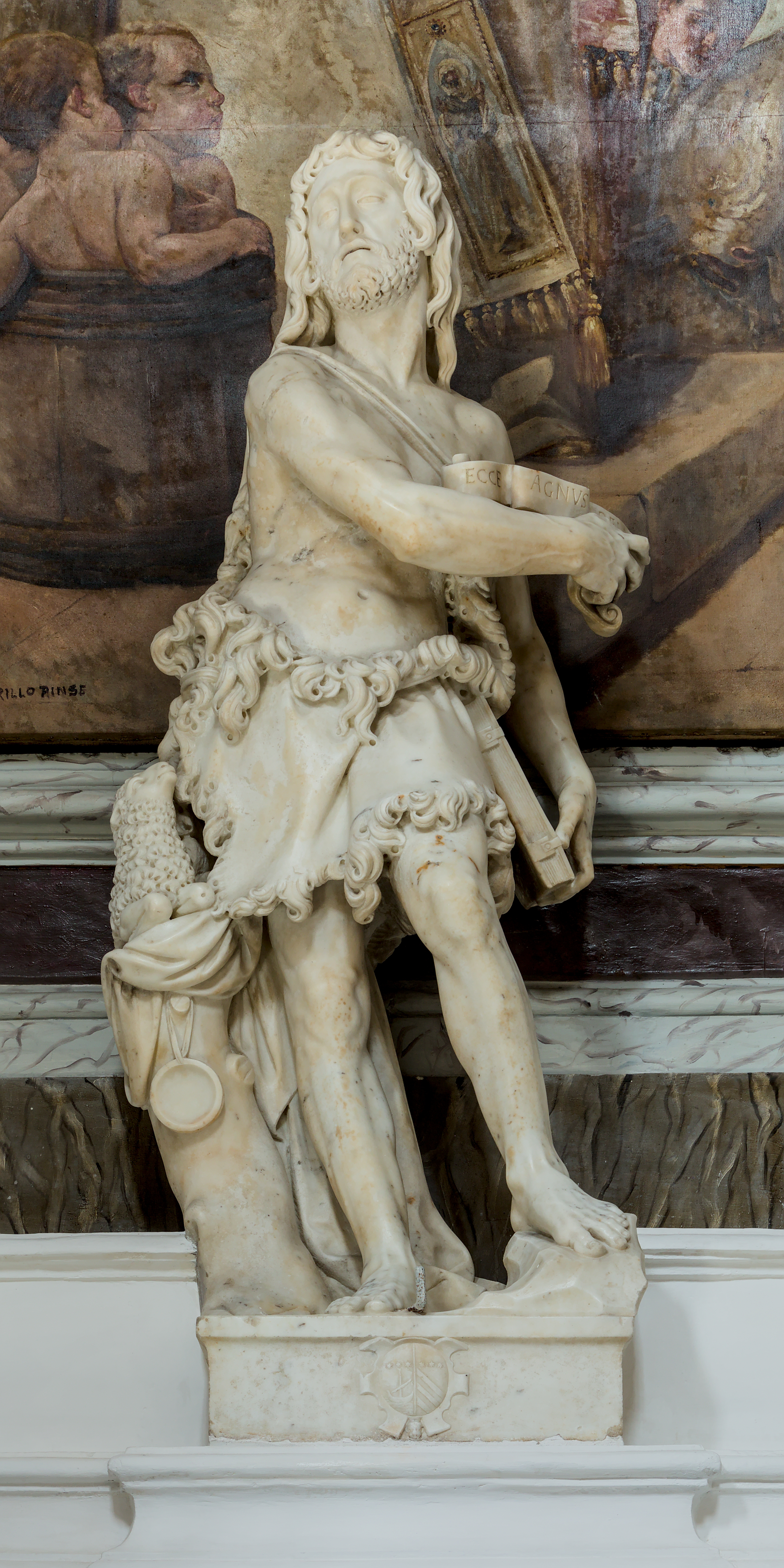
Statue of saint John the Baptist, attributed to Pietro Bernini, in the church of St. George.

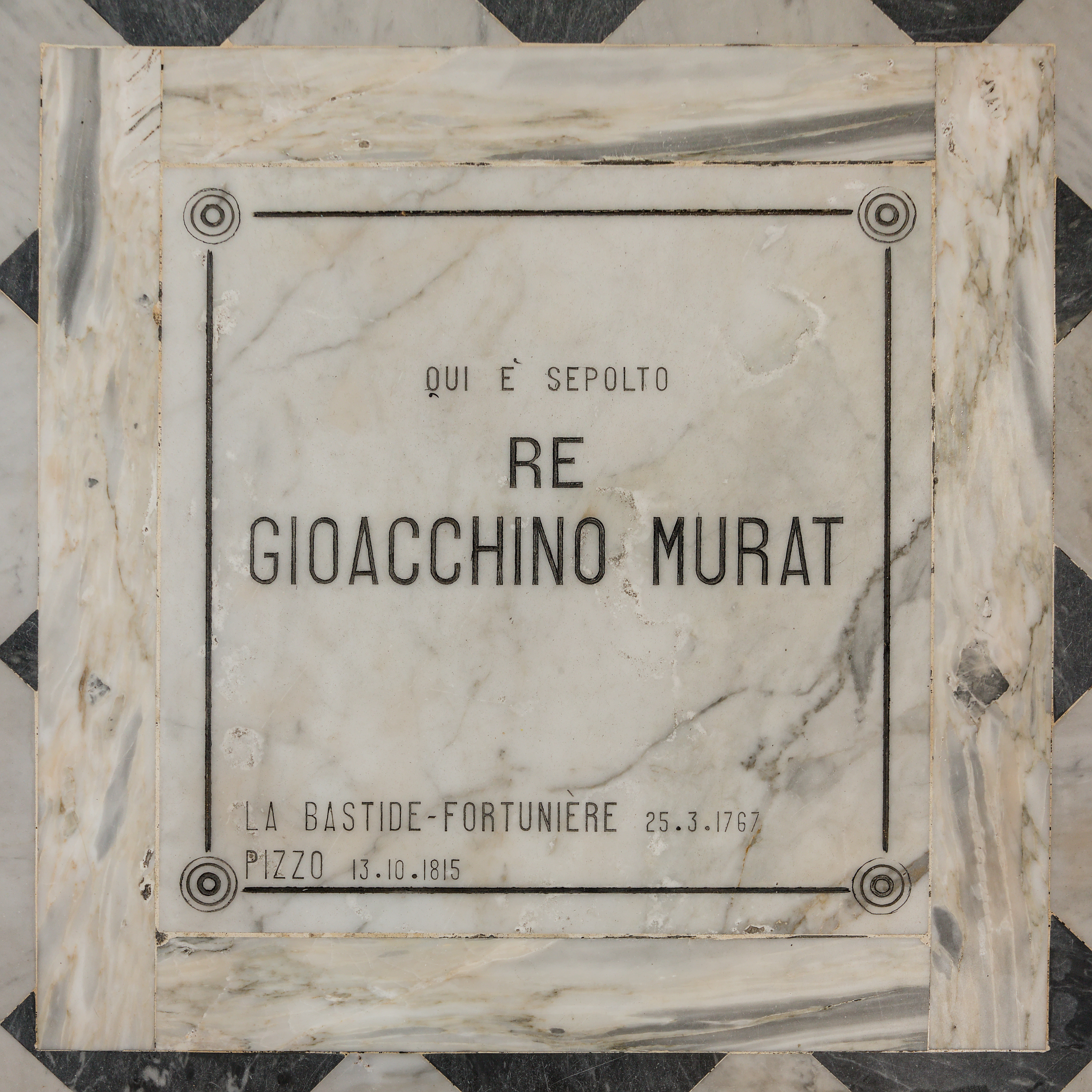
Gravestone of Joachim Murat, in the church of St. George.

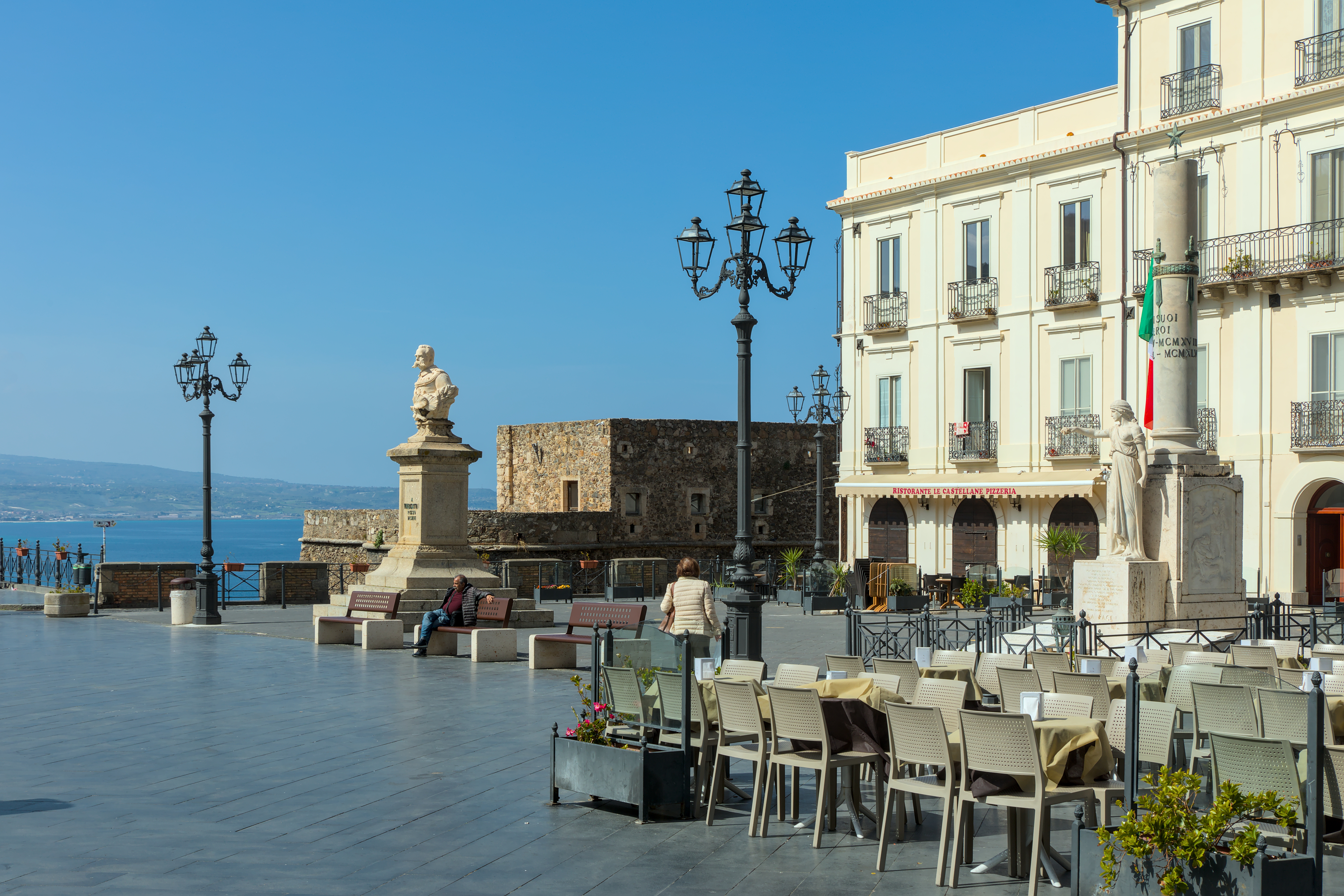
Republic square, that ends with a viewpoint over the sea.

== Cuisine ==
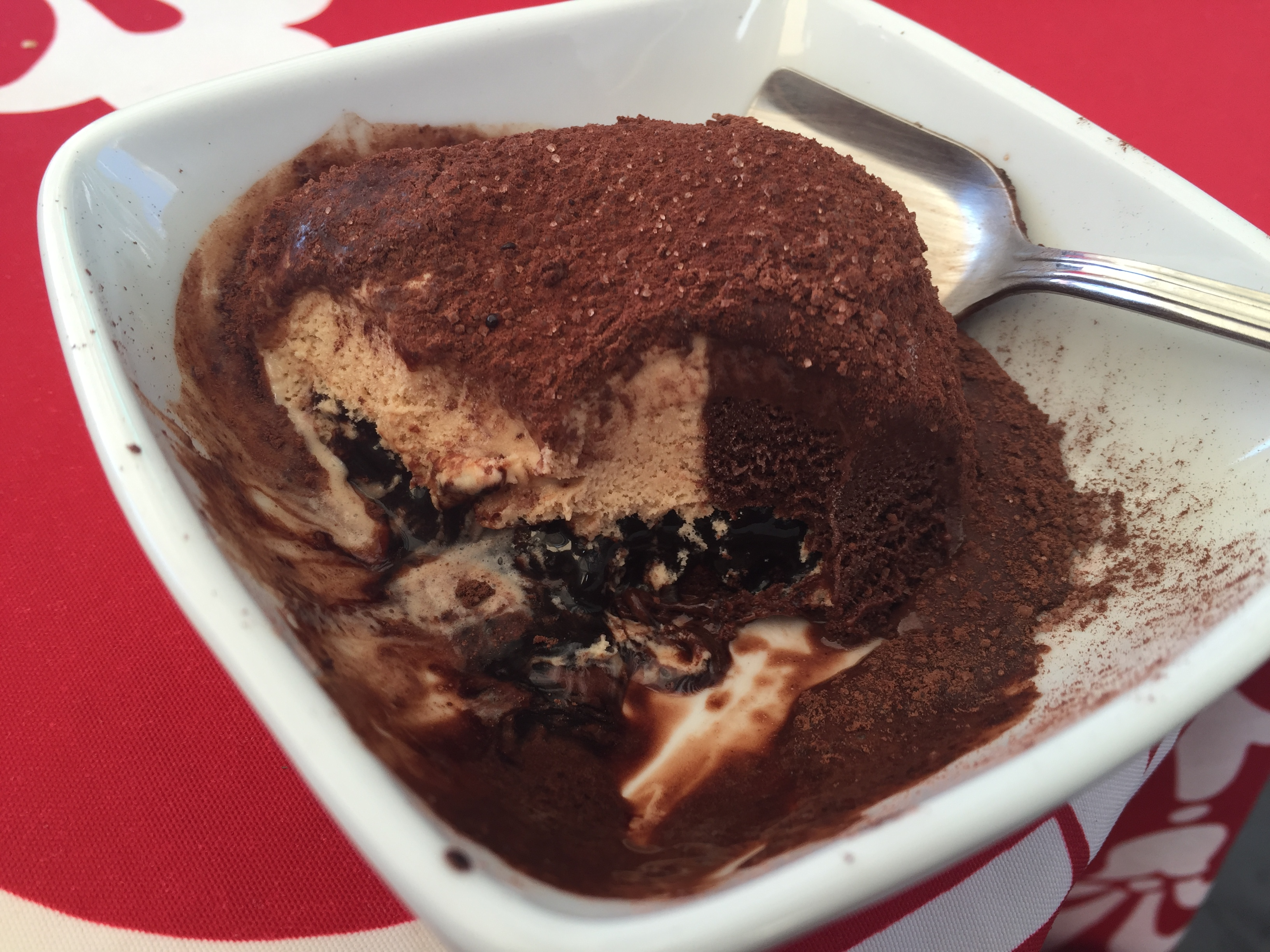
Tartufo with melted chocolate placed inside, visible upon separation of the traditional ball shape

Pizzo is famous in the area for its Tartufo, a large ball of ice cream filled with molten chocolate.

== Transport ==
The nearest airport is Lamezia Terme Airport.
