= Wazu =

Wazu or WAZU may refer to:

- Va people, called "Wǎzú" in Chinese
- Words Worth, an erotic anime and video game known as Wāzu Wāsu in Japanese
- Wudu, an Islamic washing ritual called "wazū'" in Urdu

== Radio stations ==
- WAZU, a non-commercial radio station in Peoria, Illinois
- WJYD, a Columbus, Ohio area radio station that used the call sign from January 1997 to January 2007
- WSAI, a Cincinnati, Ohio radio station that used the call sign from August 1996 to December 1997
- WAXL, a southern Indiana radio station that used the call sign from June 1995 to 1996
- WDHT, a Dayton-area radio station that used the call sign from 1979 to May 1995

== See also ==
- Wazoo (disambiguation)
