= Goo Goo Cluster =

Candy company in Nashville

GooGoo Cluster

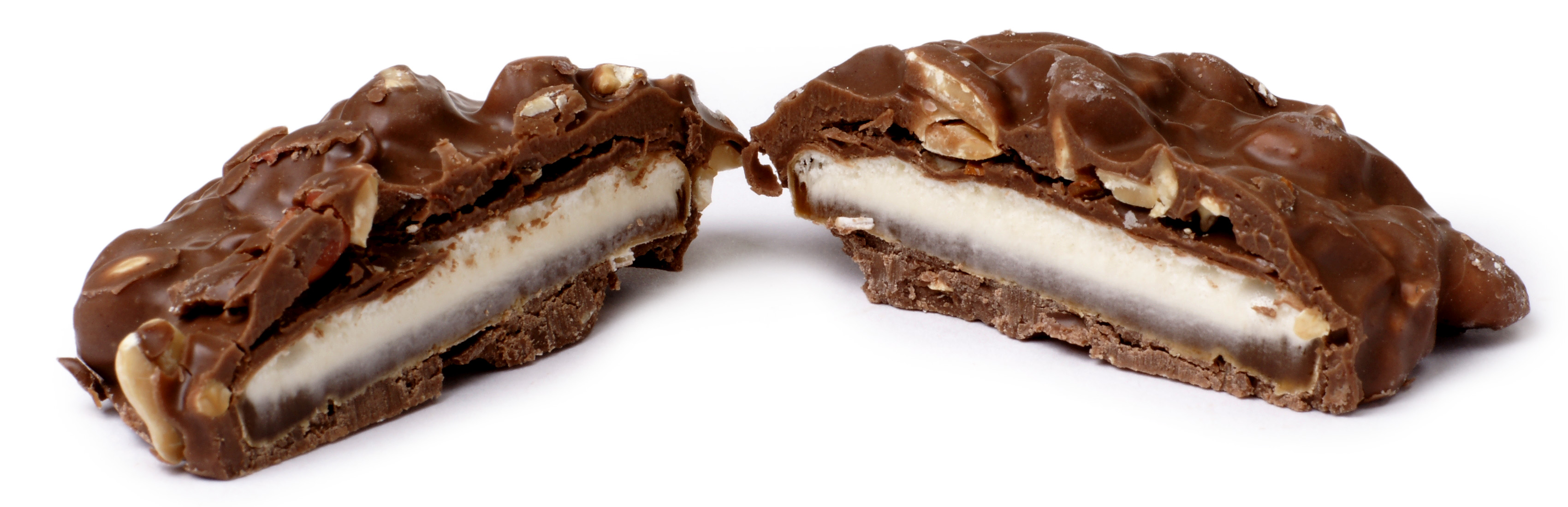
A GooGoo Cluster split open

GooGoo Cluster Collector's Tin

The Goo Goo Cluster is an American candy bar created in 1912 by Howell Campbell and the Standard Candy Company in Nashville, Tennessee. The disk-shaped candy bar contains marshmallows, nougat, caramel, and roasted peanuts covered in milk chocolate. Variations include Goo Goo Supreme (pecans replace the peanuts) which was renamed the Pecan in 2019, and Peanut Butter Goo Goo (peanut butter replaces marshmallow nougat and caramel).

== History ==
Goo Goo Cluster is considered the first combination candy bar, meaning it contained several types of candy rather than an all-chocolate bar.

The name is thought to refer to the sound a baby makes. The company uses the phrase, "So good, they'll ask for it from birth," in retelling the Goo Goo story.

Originally, the candy was sold, unpackaged, from glass jars only in the factory's local area. At the time of the Goo Goo Cluster's invention, there was no automated packaging machinery, so packaging required costly hand work. As a result, packaging was unusual unless the candy (like caramels) required wrapping to keep pieces separate. During the 1920s, after increased public attention to hygiene, the company began wrapping it, and it was sold all over the United States.

== Marketing ==
The candy was sold at the Grand Ole Opry (GOO), which was established in 1925, 13 years after the candy's debut. However, Standard Candy (with particular emphasis on the Goo Goo Cluster) was a long-time sponsor of the program.

During the 1920s and 1930s, the company advertised Goo Goo Clusters as "a nourishing lunch for a nickel". At this time, the primary nutritional concern was caloric undernourishment, especially for working-class people, and high-calorie candies were promoted as valuable and inexpensive sources of food energy.
