= Candy bar =

Candy in the shape of a bar

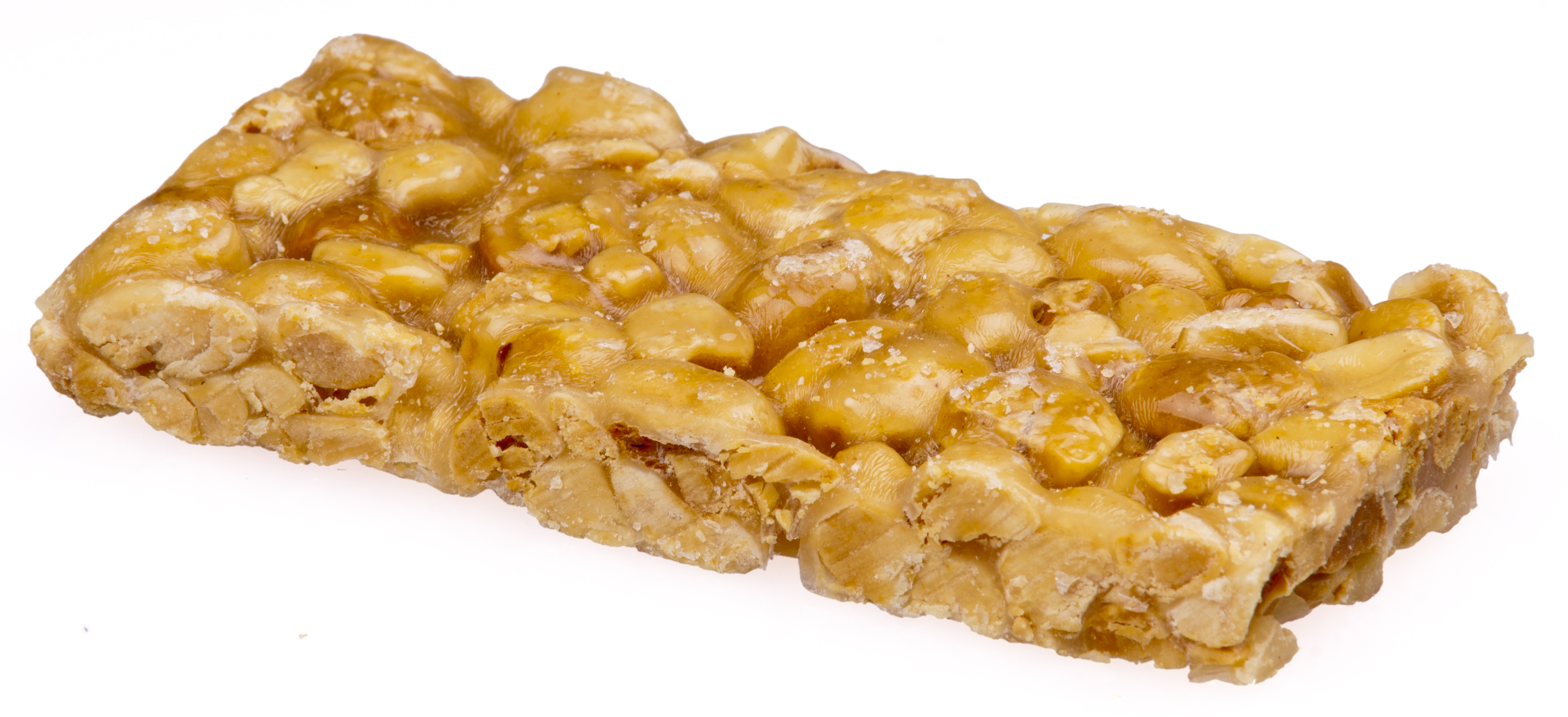
A Planters Peanut Bar. Some candy bars do not contain any chocolate.

A candy bar is a type of candy that is in the shape of a bar.

Many varieties of candy bars exist, and many are mass-produced. Between World War I and the middle of the 20th century, approximately 40,000 brands of candy bars were introduced.

== Chocolate bars ==
A chocolate bar is a bar-shaped piece of chocolate, which may also contain layerings or mixtures of other ingredients. A wide variety of chocolate bar brands are sold. A popular example is a Snickers bar, which consists of nougat mixed with caramel and peanuts.

The first chocolate tablets were produced in the early 19th century. In 1830, Kohler started producing hazelnut chocolate. In 1866, Fry's Chocolate Cream became the first mass-produced combination chocolate bar. The Goo Goo Cluster was the first mass-produced combination bar in the United States, including marshmallow, nougat, caramel, and roasted peanuts. In some varieties of English and food labeling standards, the term chocolate bar is reserved for bars of solid chocolate, with candy bar used for products with additional ingredients.

Chocolate candy bars

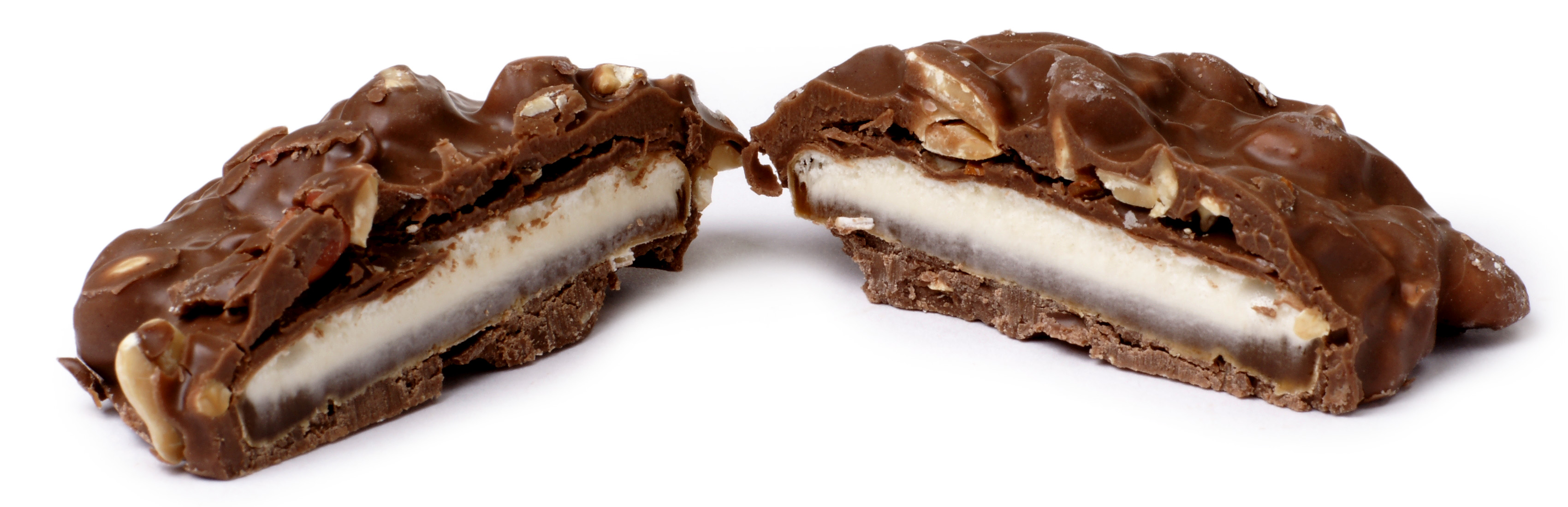
Goo Goo Clusters, a combination chocolate bar

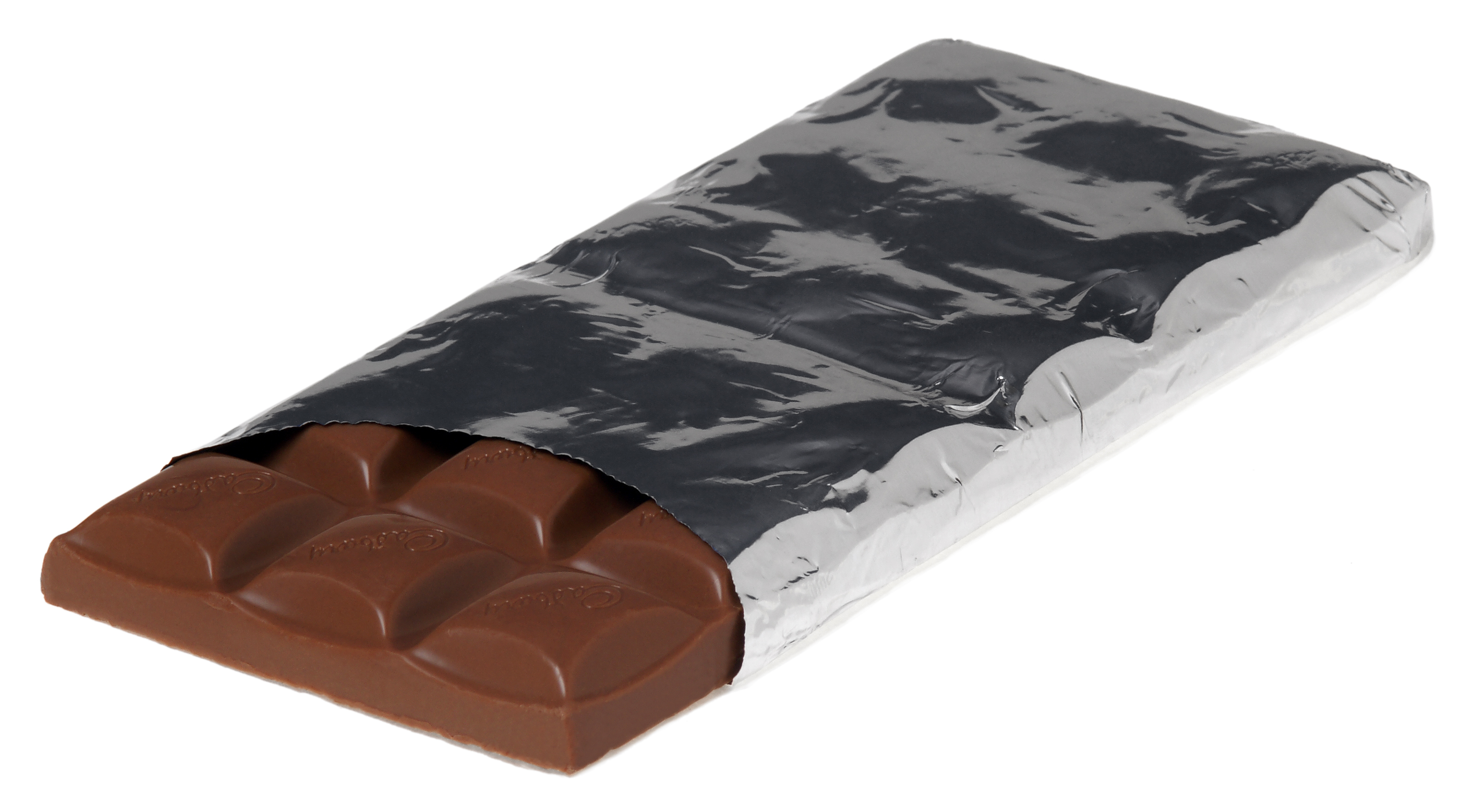
Cadbury Dairy Milk caramel bar in its foil wrapper

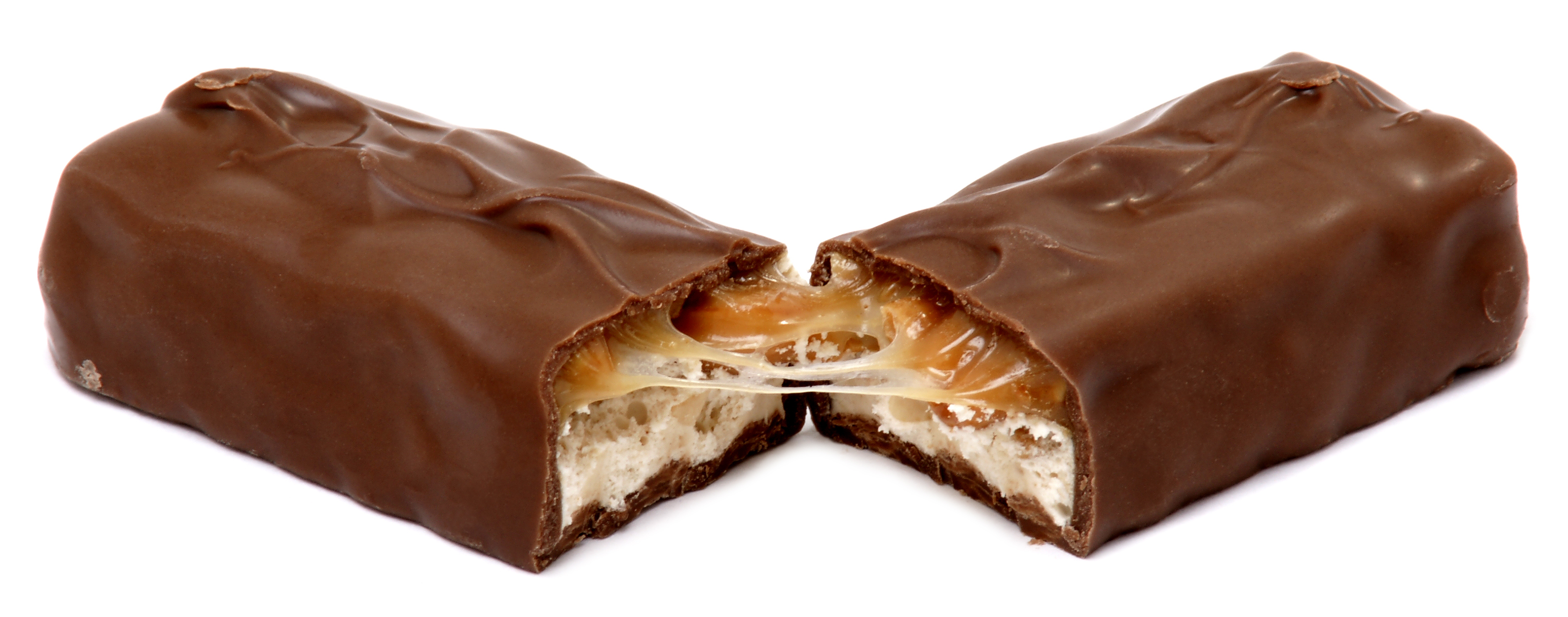
Snickers bar, a combination chocolate bar

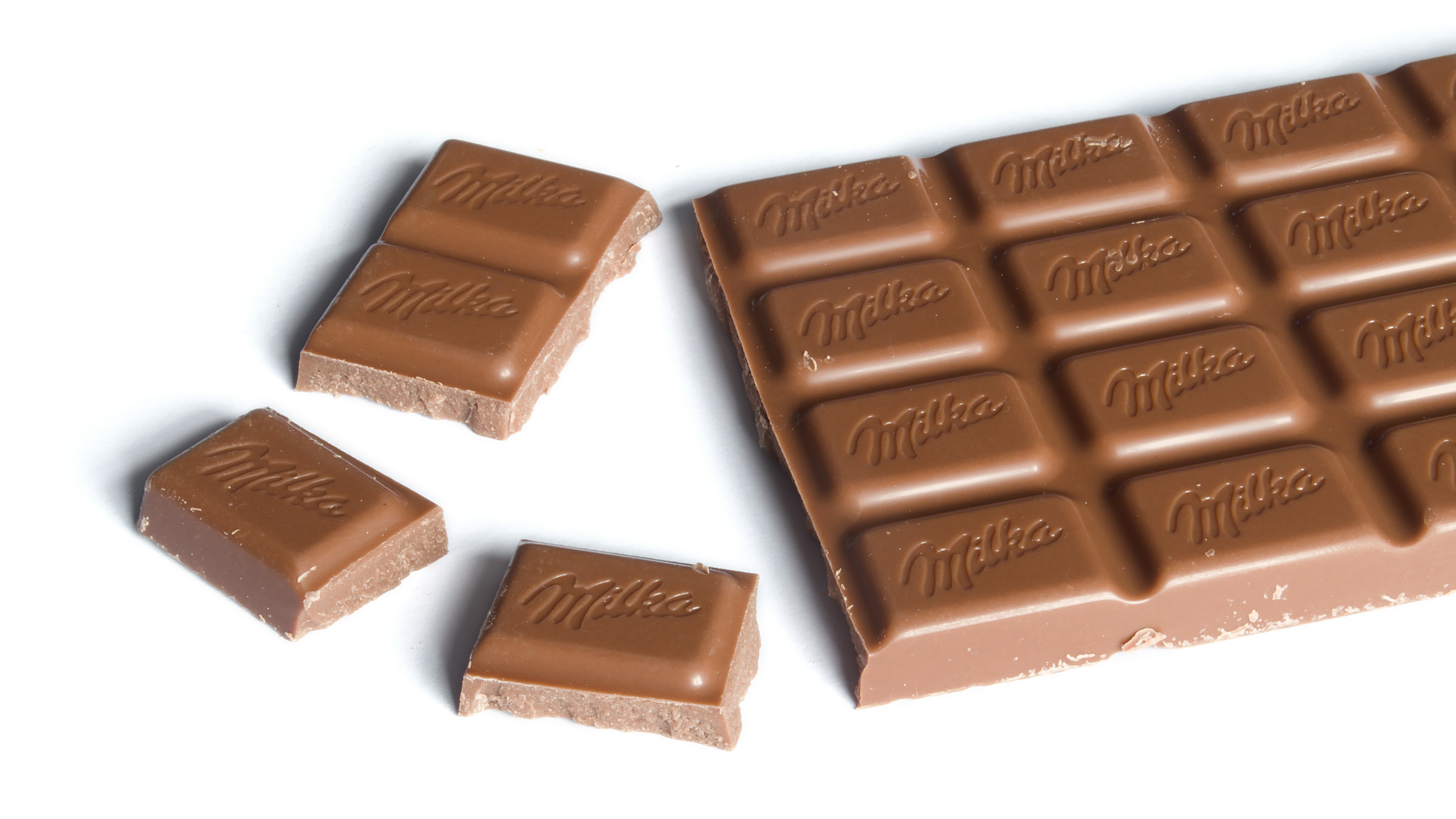
Milka brand solid milk chocolate bar

== Non-chocolate candy bars ==
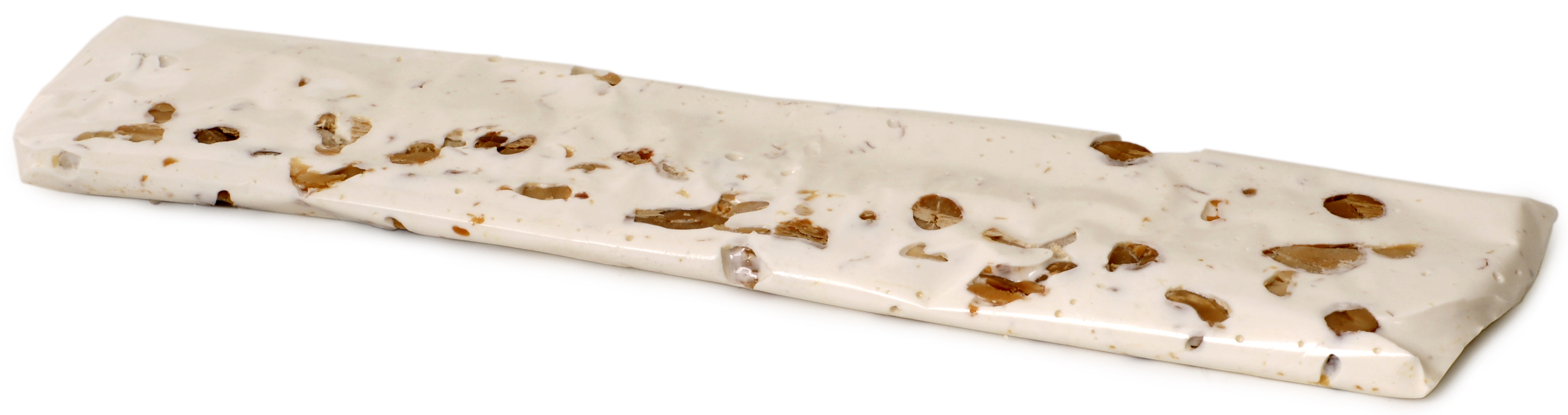
The Big Hunk Bar is a flat bar of nougat with peanuts.

Candy bars containing no chocolate include:

- Abba-Zaba: taffy with a peanut butter center
- AirHeads: a taffy based candy that comes in multiple flavours
- Big Hunk: nougat center covered with peanuts
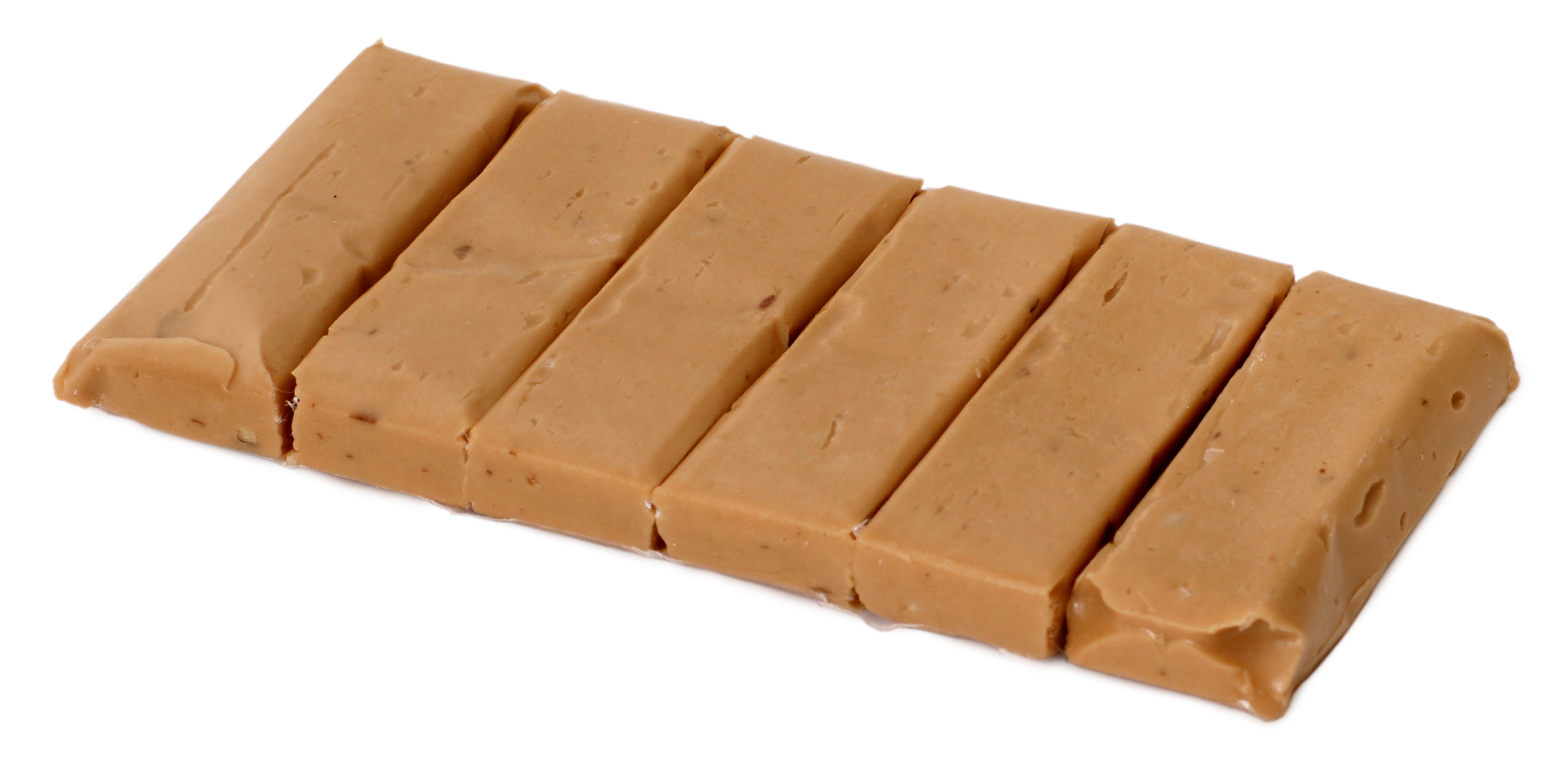
- Almond- and honey-flavored Bit-O-Honey-Bar
  Bit-O-Honey: honey-flavored taffy with almond bits
- Cajeta Elegancita: caramel center covered with goat's milk
- Carambar: caramel-based candy
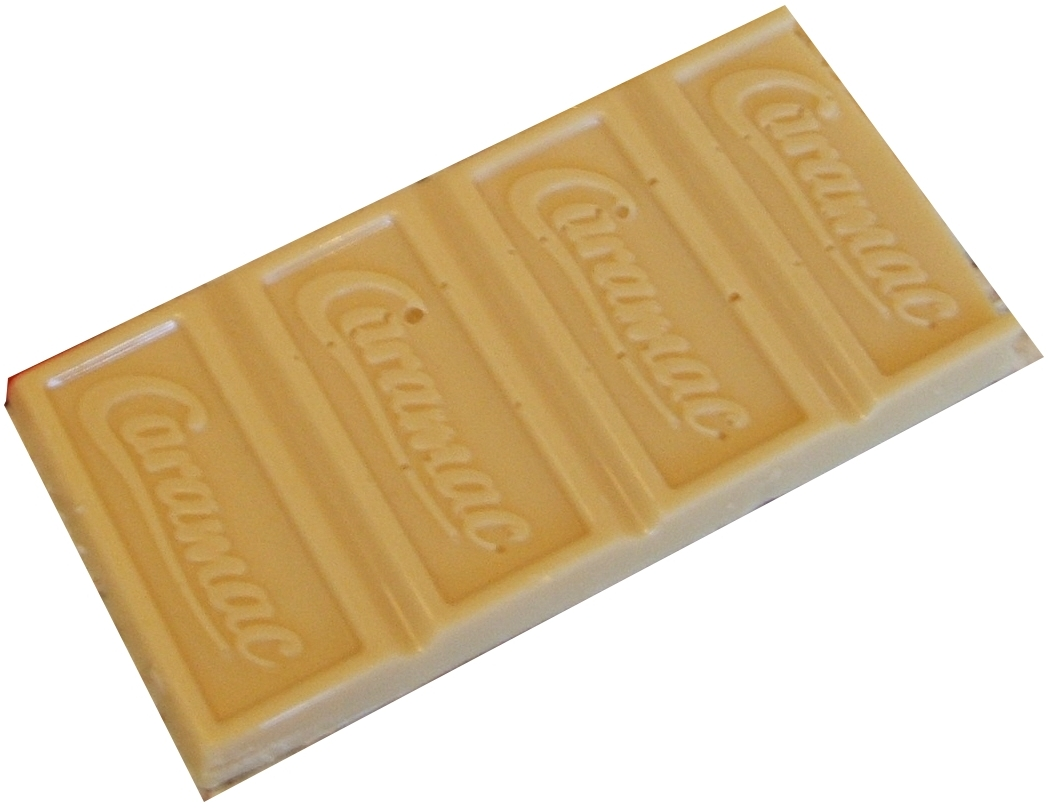
- A caramel-flavored Caramac candy bar
  Caramac: caramel-based candy
- Chick-O-Stick: peanut butter center covered with coconut
- Choo Choo Bar: liquorice-based candy
- Hershey's Cookies 'n' Mint: mint-flavored Hershey candy bar with mint-flavored cookie bits
- Hershey's Gold: caramel-flavored Hershey candy bar with peanuts and pretzels
- Kendal Mint Cake: peppermint-based candy
- Laffy Taffy: a taffy based candy that comes in multiple flavours
- Mantecol: a peanut butter nougat bar
- Mr. Tom: peanuts and caramel
- Munch: peanut brittle-like candy
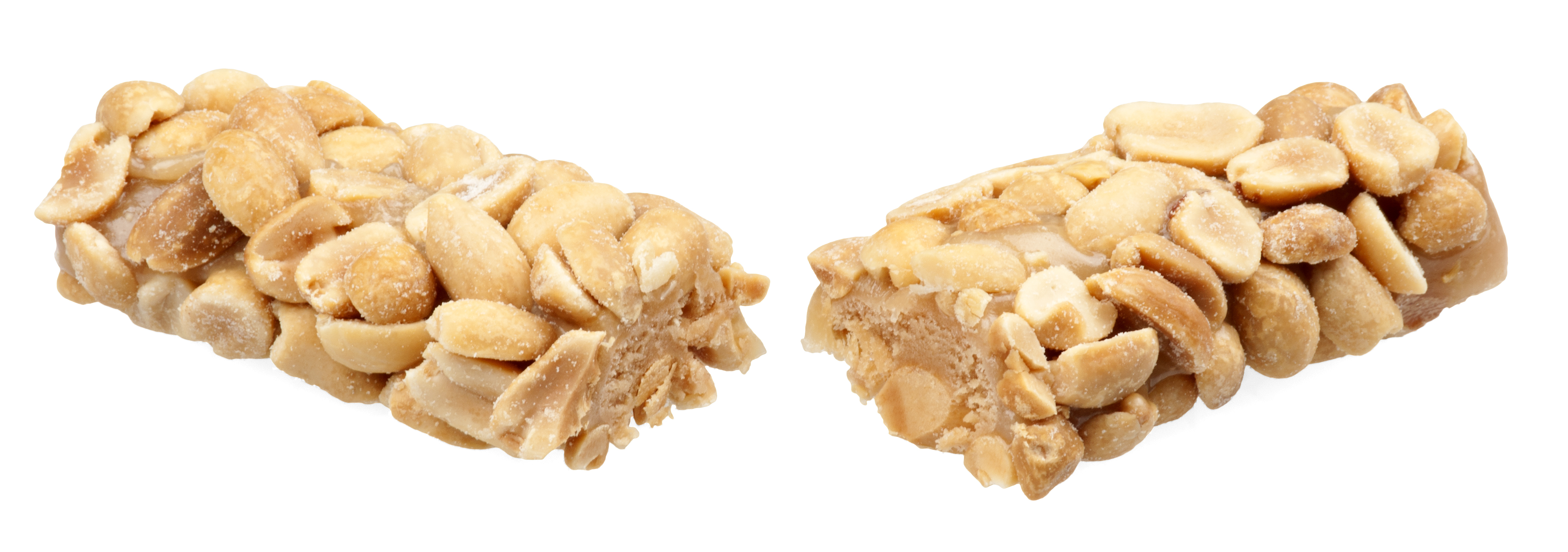
- The PayDay candy bar has peanuts and caramel.
  PayDay: peanuts and caramel
- Pecan log roll: cherry-laced nougat center covered with caramel and pecans
- Planters Peanut Bar: peanut brittle-like candy
- Salted Nut Roll: nougat center covered with caramel and peanuts
- Turkish Taffy: taffy-based candy
- Wazoo: taffy center covered with sprinkles
- Yeot-gangjeong: hangwa center covered in toasted seeds, nuts, beans or puffed grains mixed with mullyeot (rice syrup)
- Zagnut: peanut brittle wrapped in toasted coconut

== See also ==
- Candy making
- Bar (food), overview of bars
- Dessert bar – dessert similar to a bar cookie (traybake)
- Energy bar – snack food
- Granola bar – snack food similar to granola (muesli) cereal in a bar shape
- List of candies
- List of chocolate bar brands
