= Hershey's Cookies 'n' Mint =

Candy bar

- Hershey's Cookies 'n' Mint candy bar is made with a mint creme coating and cookie bits
- Type: Candy bar
- Inventor: The Hershey Company
- Inception: 1994
- Manufacturer: The Hershey Company
- Available: Available in United States, Canada and also in most 7/11 stores in the Philippines
- Current supplier: The Hershey Company
- Models: Bar

Hershey's Cookies 'n' Mint is a candy bar manufactured by The Hershey Company. The bar is a flat, green candy bar containing bits of small uniformly-shaped mint-flavored cookie bits. It was introduced in 1994, then was discontinued. The bar was brought back in 2005, and was discontinued again, only to be brought back in 2020.

== History ==
The Hershey's Cookies 'n' Mint candy bar was first introduced by The Hershey Company in 1994.

== Nutrition information ==
Hershey's Cookies 'n' Mint
Nutritional value per 100 g (3.5 oz)
- Carbohydrates: 27 g
- Sugars: 22 g
- Fat: 12 g
- Saturated: 7 g
- Trans: 0 g
- Protein: 3 g
Vitamins and minerals
Minerals	Quantity %DV^{†}
Calcium	1% 8 mg
Sodium	4% 95 mg
- Other constituents: Quantity
- Cholesterol: 10 mg
- Serving size is 1 1.55oz (or 43 g) bar
- ^{†}Percentages estimated using US recommendations for adults.
