= Annabelle Candy Company =

American confectionery company

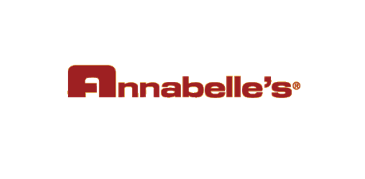
- Company type: Private
- Industry: Chocolate and candy manufacturer
- Founded: 1950
- Founder: Sam Altshuler
- Headquarters: 27211 Industrial Blvd., Hayward, California, U.S.
- Products: Rocky Road, Big Hunk, Abba-Zaba, U-No, Look!
- Owner: Promise Holdings
- Website: www.annabellecandy.com

The Annabelle Candy Company, also known as Annabelle's, is a candy manufacturer based in Hayward, California, United States. The company was founded in San Francisco, California in 1950 by Russian immigrant Sam Altshuler, who named the company after his daughter.

== History ==
The company moved in 1965 to Industrial Blvd., in Hayward, California. In 1972 the Annabelle Candy Company purchased the Golden Nugget Company. In 1978, the Annabelle Candy Company acquired the Cardinet Candy Company and added several new candy bars to its line of products. In 2022, the Pearson's Candy Company was sold to Annabelle Candy Company.

In 2016, the company set the Guinness World Record for the ‘largest taffy’ which weighed in at more than 524 pounds.

== Products ==
- Big Hunk
- Abba-Zaba
- U-no
- Look!
- Rocky-Road
