= Love Grown Foods =

Love Grown Foods is a natural food company that manufactures a line of all natural breakfast foods. The company was founded in January 2008 by Maddy D’Amato and Alex Hasulak after developing their product line as undergraduate students at the University of Denver. The company markets its products in grocery stores across The United States and Canada.

== History ==
Love Grown Foods was founded in 2008 by Maddy D’Amato and Alex Hasulak while they were students at University of Denver.

The company's first product was granola, which the founders manufactured in a catering company's commercial kitchen in Aspen, where the founders moved after graduating. The company's products were sold in one store at the beginning of 2010, and in January 2010, the founders moved back to Denver. Within a month, their products were in 80 stores. and by the end of 2010, their products were in 1300 stores, primarily through an agreement with Kroger. Its revenue for 2010 was about $200,000.

By fall 2012, their products were in 4,500 stores, by increasing the number of Kroger stores and adding Loblaws and Sobeys, two Canadian grocery chains, as well as Whole Foods Market, The Fresh Market and 400 Safeway stores in and near Colorado. The company had hired a contract manufacturer to make the granola. The company's 2011 revenue was "seven figures" but the company wouldn't specify beyond that. The company had added organic and health food industry experts to its board by September 2012.

By 2015, the company had raised $7.2 million from investors and its products were in 8,000 stores; its line of products had expanded to include oat snacks and a breakfast cereal called "Power Os".

The company's products are organic, and include no high fructose corn syrup or hydrogenated oils.

== Recognition ==
Love Grown Foods has received favorable reviews for their products from The Denver Post, Huffington Post, and other media outlets.

- Killer Granola: In November 2009, Website Chowhound named Love Grown’s "Sweet Cranberry Pecan" flavor number one in a granola taste test that included well-known brands such as Ola! and Bear Naked. The company's "Cinnamon Apple Walnut" came in at number six in the survey.
- Colorado Company to Watch: In 2014 Love Grown Foods was named a Colorado Company to Watch. Colorado Companies to watch honors second stage companies for their important role they play in their community and the state of Colorado.
- Top Women in Grocery: Founder Maddy D'Amato was awarded Top Women in Grocery by Progressive Grocer in 2014.
- Best New Cereal: Love Grown Foods Power O's was awarded "Best New Cereal" by Gourmet Retailer in August 2014

== Competition ==
Love Grown Foods faces competition from other natural granola companies. Bear Naked is by far the largest competitor because of the national availability of Bear Naked products. Ola! Granola is similar to Love Grown, but is currently only in the North Eastern United States. Another Colorado based competitor is Udi’s granola. Udi’s Healthy Foods has a larger market share, spreading through parts of the Pacific States and Upper Midwest.

== See also ==
- University of Denver
- Aspen, Colorado
- Granola
- Bear Naked
