= Big Hunk =

Candy bar

The Big Hunk

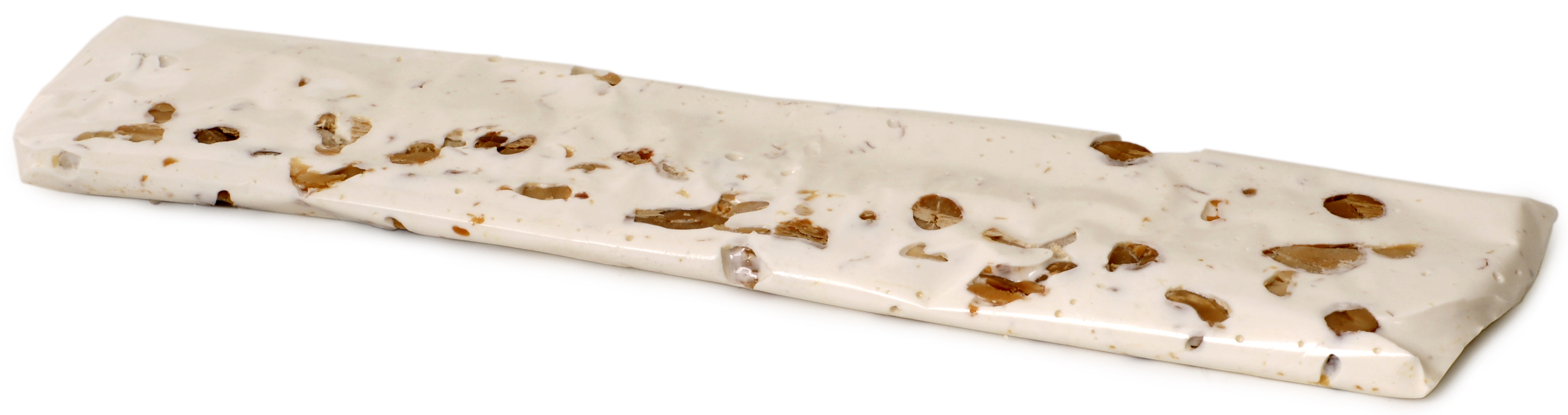
An opened Big Hunk Bar

Big Hunk is a candy bar made by Annabelle Candy Company.

It first entered production in the 1950s, in the United States. It is a bar of roasted peanuts covered in chewy honey-sweetened nougat. When struck on a hard surface, such as a table, it shatters into "bite-sized" pieces.

It was featured in Steve Almond’s book, Candyfreak, as being one of several successful candies made by a small company. Big Hunk was acquired by Annabelle Candy Company when the company purchased Golden Nugget Candy Company in 1970.
