= Tartufo =

Italian gelato dessert

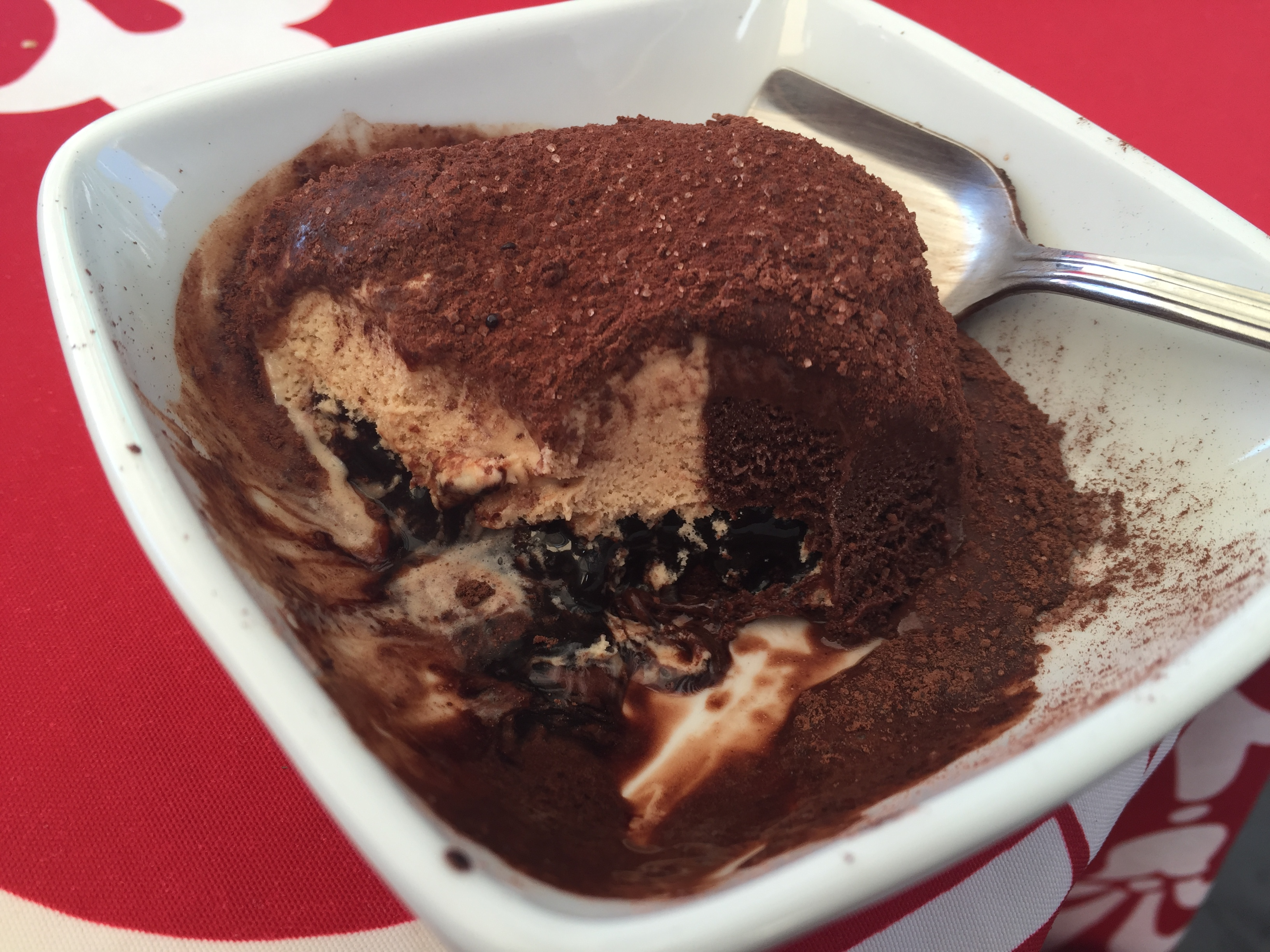
- Tartufo di Pizzo with melted chocolate placed inside, visible upon separation of the traditional ball shape
- Alternative names: Tartufo di Pizzo
- Place of origin: Italy
- Region or state: Pizzo, Calabria

Tartufo (/tɑːrˈtuːfoʊ/, Italian: [tarˈtuːfo]; lit. 'truffle'), also known as tartufo di Pizzo, is an Italian dessert of gelato originating in the comune (municipality) of Pizzo, Calabria. The dessert takes the form of a ball that is composed of two or more flavors of gelato, often with melted chocolate inserted into the center (following the original recipe) or alternatively, with either fruit syrup or frozen fruit—typically raspberry, strawberry or cherry—in the center. Typically, the dessert is covered in a shell made of chocolate or cocoa, but sometimes cinnamon or nuts are used.

Tartufo di Pizzo has protected geographical indication (PGI) in Italy, because Pizzo is the historical location where it was created as a "dessert of chocolate and hazelnut gelato balls filled with molten chocolate sauce and dusted in cocoa powder".

== See also ==
Media related to Tartufo at Wikimedia Commons

- List of Italian desserts and pastries
- List of ice cream flavors
