= U-No Bar =

Brand of chocolate bar

U-NO
- Product type: Confectionery
- Current owner: Annabelle Candy Company
- Country: United States
- Introduced: 1920; 106 years ago
- Previous owners: Cardinet Candy Company (until 1978)
- Tagline: Rich Creamy Chocolate That's Outta This World
- Website: Annabelle's U-NO

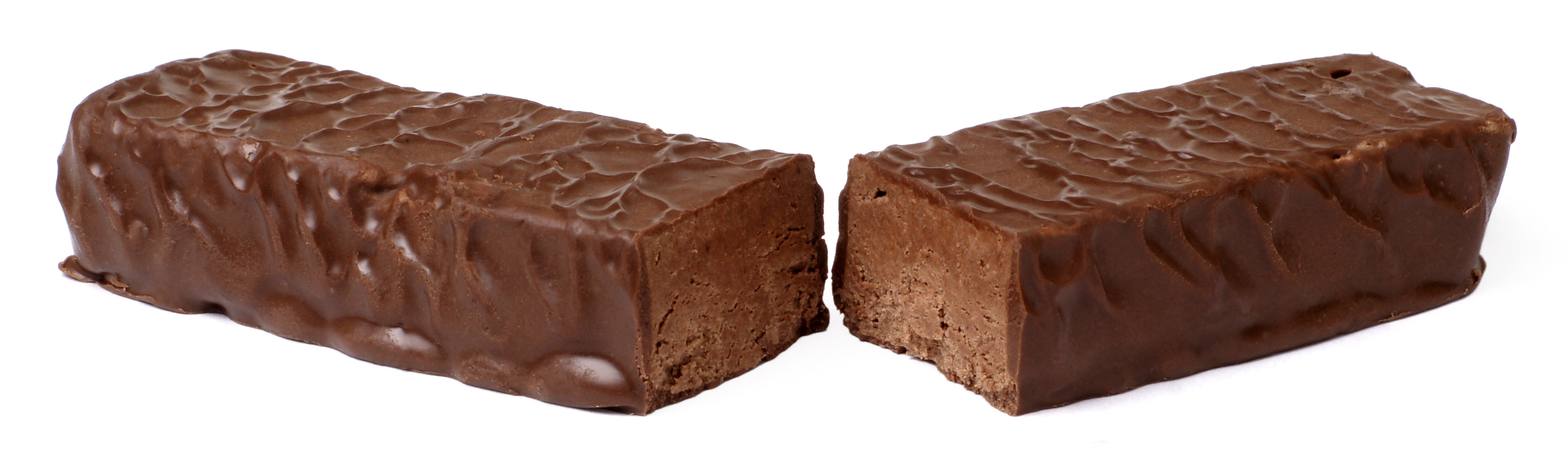
A U-No Bar split

The U-NO Bar is a truffle type bar with almond bits covered in a thin layer of chocolate, and wrapped in a silver foil-like wrapper. It is comparable to a 3 Musketeers bar in appearance but has a higher fat per gram ratio. Its center is a chocolate, truffle-like fluff covered in a thin layer of milk chocolate and ground almonds. U-NO bars used to come in two flavors: Original and Mint. Annabelle Candy Company has since discontinued the mint flavor. As of April 2025 the U NO Candy Bar has been discontinued per Anabelle due to the shutdown of the Hayward facility.

U-NO was created by the Cardinet Candy Company in the 1920s, until its acquisition by the Annabelle Candy Company in 1978.

== Nutritional Information ==
According to the label, an U-NO bar (38.3g) has 235 calories, 10 grams of saturated fat, 16 grams of total fat, 12 grams of sugar, 3 grams of protein, and 42 mg of sodium.

== Ingredients ==
Milk Chocolate (Contains: Sugar, Cocoa Butter, Chocolate Liquor, Whole Milk Powder, Soy Lecithin as an Emulsifier, Natural Vanilla Flavor), Sugar, Hydrogenated Coconut Oil, Hydrogenated Palm Kernel Oil, Cocoa Powder, Nonfat Milk Powder, Whey Powder, Almonds Roasted Almonds, Soy Lecithin, Artificial Flavor (Vanillin), Salt.

Made in a facility that uses: Milk, Eggs, Wheat, Tree Nuts, and Peanuts.
