= Mr. Tom =

Candy bar

- Product type: Candy bar
- Current owner: Hosta Meltis
- Country: Germany
- Introduced: 1955
- Website: www.hosta-group.com/en/

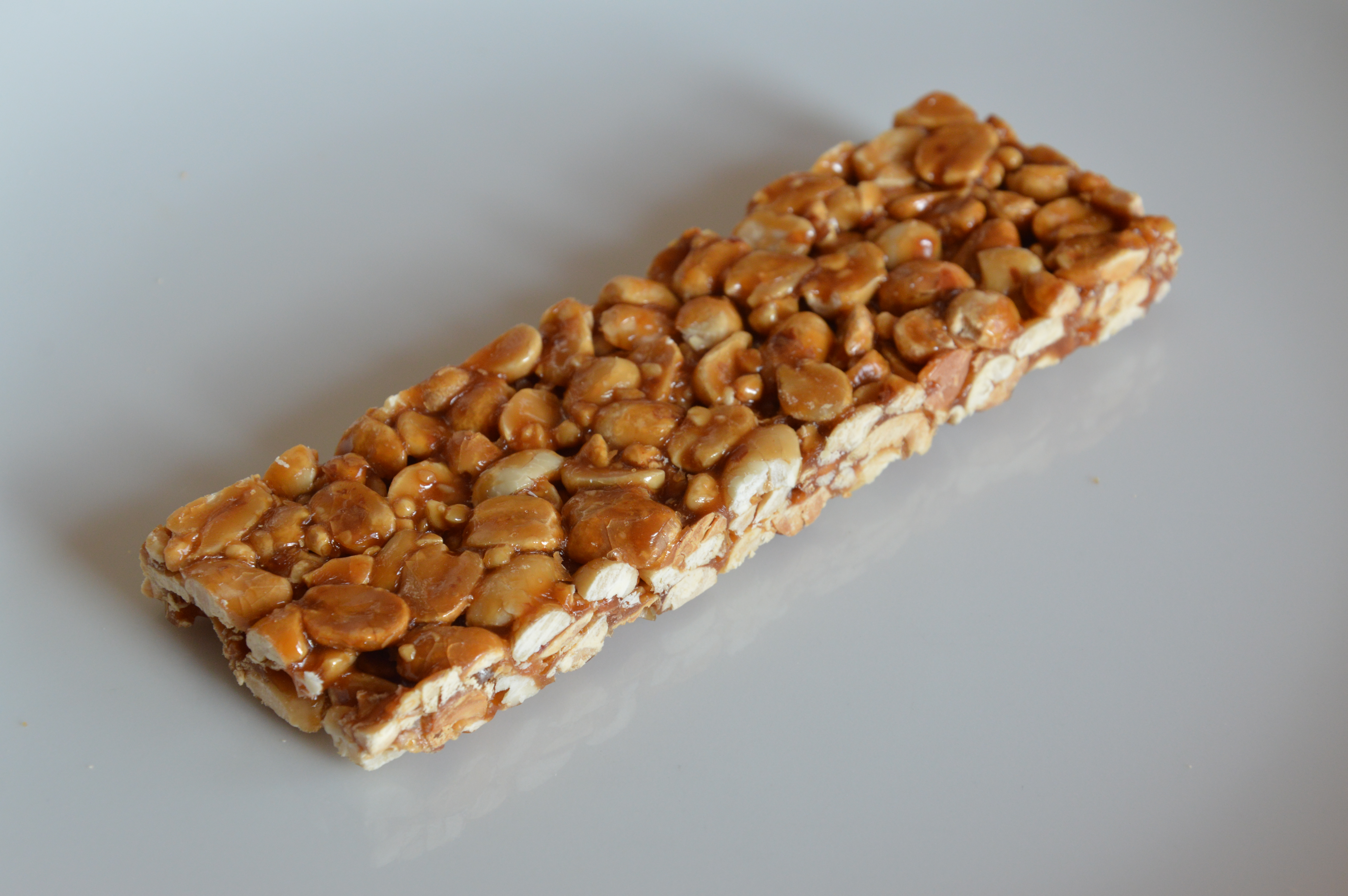
Mr. Tom candy bar

Mr. Tom is a candy bar containing roasted peanuts and caramel. Its wrapper has a yellow background and red text. It is manufactured by Hosta Meltis, a division of Swiss company Hosta International.

Mr. Tom sponsored the football club Sheffield Wednesday during the 1991-1992 season, when the Owls finished third.

From 2014 to 2018, the brand was the shirt sponsor of Newport County football club.

== See also ==
- List of confectionery brands
