= Wazoo (candy) =

Candy bar brand

Wazoo (often known as the Wazoo bar) was a candy bar launched by Topps in 2009. The bar was taffy with a creamy, tangy coating covered in sprinkles. The candy bar came in two flavors: "Blue Razz" and "Wild Berriez". It was invented by Dan Hart and his partner Gary Weiss and was pitched to Topps who began production with Cherrydale Farms as the sole copacker.

Cherrydale Farms produced the Wazoo bar for $0.69 per unit. Shortly after the initial run of Wazoo bars, Cherrydale Farms ceased their candy production operations and sold their factory at auction due to financial struggles the company had been facing for many years. The shutdown of Cherrydale Farms candy production lead to the discontinuation of the Wazoo bar with only the initial run ever being produced.
