= Melvin Gordon (businessman) =

American businessman (1919–2015)

Melvin J. Gordon (November 26, 1919 – January 20, 2015) was an American business executive and businessman. He served as the chairman and CEO of Tootsie Roll Industries for fifty-three years, from 1962 until January 2015. Gordon, who was 95 years old, was the oldest CEO of a company trading on a major American stock exchange at the time of his death in 2015. He oversaw the day-to-day production of the company's trademark brands, including Tootsie Rolls, Tootsie Pops, Junior Mints, and Charleston Chews. As of 2015, the company manufactures approximately sixty-four million Tootsie Rolls per day.

== Biography ==
Gordon was born in November 26, 1919, in Boston, Massachusetts. He received a bachelor's degree from Harvard University in 1941 and a Master of Business Administration from Harvard Business School in 1943. After college, Gordon moved to a military training school in Camp Lee, Virginia, where he was hired as a quartermaster instructor. He later became the editor of Quartermaster Journal. Gordon then became the chief executive of a women's hosiery and knitwear company headquartered in Manchester, New Hampshire.

Melvin Gordon married his wife, the former Ellen Rubin, in 1950. Ellen Gordon's father was William Rubin, the president of the Sweets Company of America, which manufactured Tootsie Rolls and Tootsie Pops. Gordon became the CEO of the company in 1962, a position he held until his death in January 2015. The company changed its name to Tootsie Roll Industries in 1966.

Under Gordon, Tootsie Roll Industries acquired Mason and Bonomo, the manufacturer of Dots gumdrops, during the 1970s. The company also purchased the Charm Company, the maker of Charms Blow Pops, in the 1980s. Gordon added the Junior Mints and Sugar Daddy's to the company's product acquisitions during the 1990s. He also oversaw the purchase of the Dubble Bubble and Andes Chocolate Mints by Tootsie Roll Industries in the early 2000s.

In 2006, Gordon donated $25 million to build the Ellen and Melvin Gordon Center for Integrative Science (or GCIS [ʤisɪs]) at the University of Chicago. Candy Industry Magazine awarded Gordon its Kettle Award in 2009. Ellen Gordon, the company's president, also received the Kettle Award in 1985. The Gordons became the first husband and wife to win the award, which the magazine nicknamed "Kettle's First Couple."

Gordon continued to work a full daily schedule until December 2014. Melvin Gordon died in Boston, Massachusetts, on January 20, 2015, following a short illness at the age of 95. He was survived by Ellen Gordon, his wife of 65 years, and their four daughters, Virginia L. Gordon, Wendy J. Gordon, Lisa J. Gordon and Karen Gordon Mills.

Gordon's widow, Tootsie Roll Industries president and chief operating officer Ellen Gordon, was appointed as the company's new chairman and CEO by the board of directors following her husband's death.
