= Bromangelon =

American gelatin dessert

Bromangelon was a gelatin dessert popular in the late 19th century and early 20th century. It was invented around 1895 by Leo Hirschfield, who would later invent the Tootsie Roll. Bromangelon is regarded as the first commercially successful gelatin dessert powder, having been mass-marketed several years before Jell-O, which would eventually drive Bromangelon off the market.

== Name ==
The origin of the name "Bromangelon" is unknown. At a Boston exhibition in 1895, representatives of the manufacturer, Stern and Saalberg, Co., claimed the name meant "angel's food." But the 1903 edition of the American Druggist and Pharmaceutical Record reported a significantly different etymology; “What is Bromangelon? ... A foul spirit. From bromos, a stench, and angellus, a messenger, angel, or spirit.”

In some advertisements, the name was broken up as "Bro-Man-Gel-On." This may have been a way to make the long name easier to remember or pronounce, or it may have been intended to imply that the name was a portmanteau, like Nabisco's original meaning of "National Biscuit Company".

== Product history ==
Bromangelon initially came in four flavors: lemon, orange, raspberry, and strawberry. Over the next 15 years, cherry, chocolate, and peach were introduced, so by 1910, the total number of flavors was brought to seven.

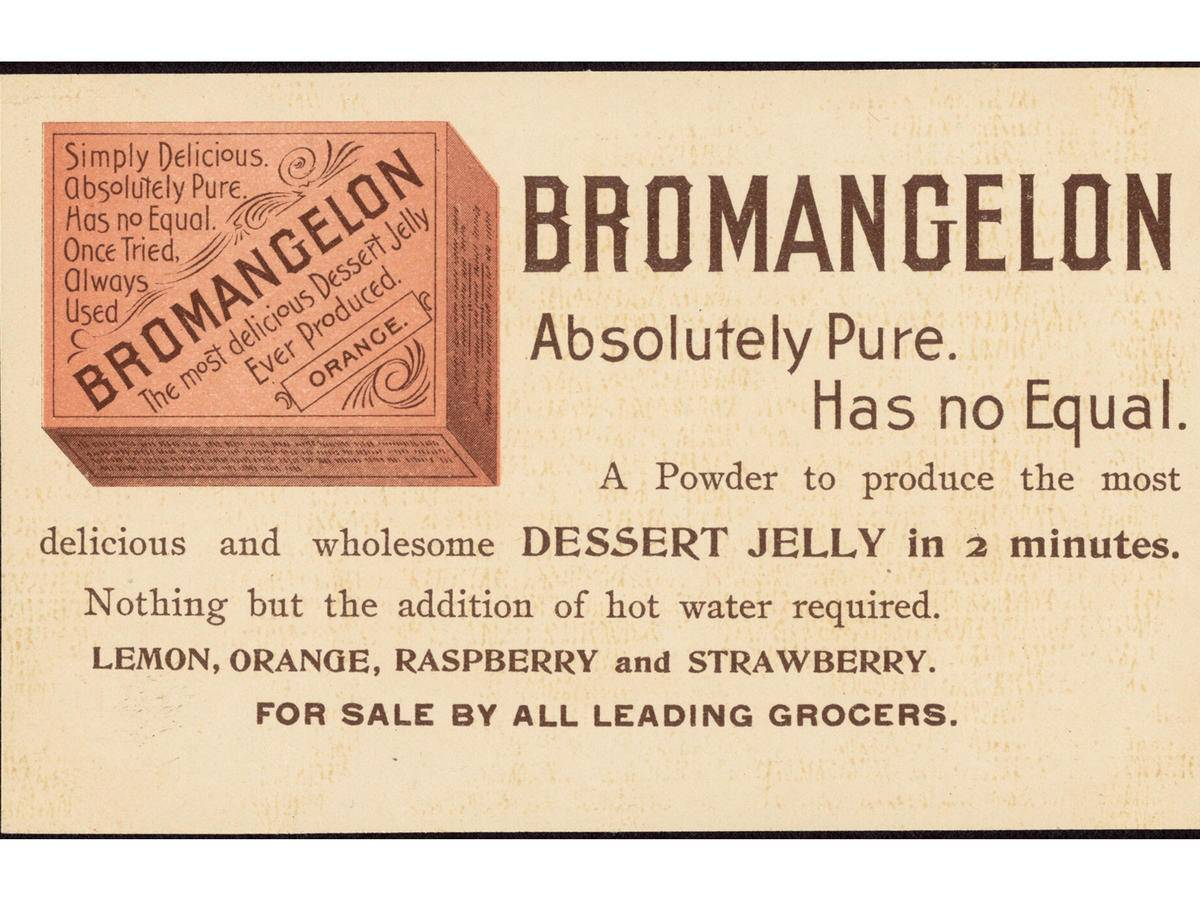
This 1895 advertisement shows the four flavors that were available when Bromangelon was invented: lemon, orange, raspberry, and strawberry.

Gelatin, a product made from animal collagen, had been used in cooking since the 15th century. However, it was expensive and time-consuming to make, because chefs had to extract it from boiled animal bones and connective tissues by hand. This put it out of reach for many home cooks, and making a gelatin dessert or aspic was regarded as a food-science curiosity reserved for the wealthiest socialites. Bromangelon was not the first powdered gelatin. It had been invented in 1845 by industrialist Peter Cooper, who built the first American steam-powered locomotive, the Tom Thumb. However, Cooper was more interested in making glue than gelatin, so it never caught on. Knox Gelatine, which hit the market shortly before Bromangelon, was popular but still required the user to soak unflavored sheets in water to activate them.

Bromangelon was the first flavored instant gelatin powder. Sold in 10- or 15-cent packets (the equivalent of about $3 or $4.50 in 2018), it was quick, cheap, and tasty. Suddenly, home cooks could whip up sophisticated-looking desserts and side dishes in only the advertised "2 minutes time".

People began to use Bromangelon in a variety of dishes, some more outlandish than others. A 1910 hostess' guide from Stern and Saalberg, the manufacturers, recommended new interpretations of classics, such as roast turkey with cherry Bromangelon, Bromangelon sherbet, and Bromangelon wine jellies. To a 1909 cookbook of the Woman's Club of San Mateo, one Mrs. Brady submitted "Macaroon Bromangelon", an elaborate trifle-like dessert of ladyfingers, whipped cream, Sherry-soaked macaroons, and strawberry Bromangelon. A particularly elaborate recipe came from a 1900 ad in Good Housekeeping Magazine, which offers "Shredded Wheat Biscuit Jellied Apple Sandwich". The recipe involves taking what appears to be huge blocks of shredded wheat, stuffing them with stewed apples, and soaking the entire arrangement in a layer of pink Bromangelon.

Jell-O was trademarked in 1897, two years after Bromangelon was invented. It was only a minor success until 1904, when the company adopted a new marketing strategy featuring illustrated ads in Ladies' Home Journal, free giveaways, and a kid-centered message. Sales of Jell-O skyrocketed to about $250,000 a year, or $8.96 million in 2025 dollars. Bromangelon could never reach that level of popularity, and the product faded away by the 1930s.

== Connection to Tootsie Rolls ==
The inventor of Bromangelon, Austrian Jewish immigrant confectioner Leo Hirschfield, trademarked Tootsie Rolls in 1908.

Although the precise nature of a connection between the two products is not known, the invention of chocolate Bromangelon around the turn of the 20th century might hold a clue as to what Hirschfield was working on at the time. When representatives from Stern and Saalberg, the manufacturer of Bromangelon (and later, Tootsie Rolls) came to Barre, Vermont, in October 1907 to demonstrate Bromangelon, they also brought another product called "Tootsies", which the Barre Daily Times reported "is made from Bromangelon." Today's Tootsie Rolls do not contain gelatin, so it is unclear if this was an early prototype or a completely separate product. However, it is likely that, at the very least, the fact that Hirschfield delivered a success with Bromangelon put him on the map at Stern and Saalberg, which allowed him the financial and institutional backing he needed to launch a major candy product. By 1913, Hirschfield was the vice president of Stern and Saalberg, which later became the Sweets Corporation of America in 1917 and Tootsie Roll Industries in 1966.

== Mascot ==
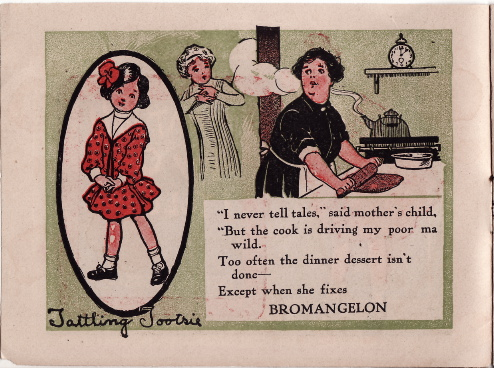
This vintage advertisement for Bromangelon features Tattling Tootsie, an early mascot inspired by the inventor's daughter, Clara, whose nickname, "Tootsie" eventually was the namesake of the Tootsie Roll.

Some advertisements for Bromangelon featured a character named "Tattling Tootsie", whom candy scholar Samira Kawash describes as "a cute little girl whose mischief seems only tangentially connected to the joys of gelatin." Inventor Leo Hirschfield's daughter Clara's nickname was "Tootsie" — the namesake for his later invention, Tootsie Rolls. It is thought that Clara inspired Tattling Tootsie as well.
