= Crows (candy) =

Brand of licorice candy

- A box of Crows
- Type: Gum drops
- Place of origin: United States
- Invented: 1890s
- Similar dishes: Dots

Crows are a licorice candy identical in shape and texture to Dots. Their mascot is a crow with a top hat and cane.

== History ==
Crows were invented in the 1890s by confectioners Henrique Cataldi and Joseph Maison. The Black Crows trademark was registered in 1911. There is an urban legend that Crows were to be called "Black Rose", but the printer misheard the name as "Black Crows" and printed wrappers with the wrong name on them. This myth has been debunked.

In 1972, Tootsie Roll Industries acquired the Crows brand by purchasing the Mason Division of the Candy Corporation of America.

== See also ==
- List of confectionery brands
