= Cry Baby (gum) =

Brand of bubble gum

Cry Baby is an American brand of sour bubble gum manufactured by Tootsie Roll Industries. The product was originally named by David Klein who invented the Jelly Belly jelly beans.

Cry Babies, sometimes mistakenly referred to as Tear Jerkers (a separately branded product produced by the Charms Candy Company), began production in 1991. Originally produced by Philadelphia Chewing Gum Corporation in Havertown, Pennsylvania, the candies were later purchased by the present-day manufacturer, Tootsie Roll Industries, in 2004, as part of its Concord Confections acquisition.

Cry Babies are best known for their sour coating, which disappears shortly after the gum is chewed. The product's packaging claims that the gum remains sour for 40 seconds once chewed. The name "Cry Baby" stems from the rumour that the candy is sour enough to cause a person's eyes to water.

They come in the following fruit flavors:

- Lemon
- Cherry
- Green Apple
- Blue Raspberry
- Orange

== See also ==
- List of confectionery brands
