= Fluffy Stuff =

Brand of cotton candy

- Fluffy Stuff logo

Nutritional value per 100 g (3.5 oz)
- Energy: 1,644.31 kJ (393.00 kcal)
- Carbohydrates: 100 g
- Sugars: 100 g
- Dietary fibre: 0 g
- Fat: 0 g
- Saturated: 0 g
- Trans: 0 g
- Protein: 0 g
- Vitamins: Quantity %DV^{†}
- Vitamin A equiv.: 0% 0 μg
- Vitamin C: 0% 0 mg
- Minerals: Quantity %DV^{†}
- Calcium: 0% 0 mg
- Sodium: 0% 0 mg
- Zinc: 0% 0 mg
- Amounts converted and rounded to be relative to 71 g serving.
- ^{†}Percentages estimated using US recommendations for adults. Source: EatThisMuch

Fluffy Stuff is a brand of cotton candy sold in a variety of fruit flavors, marketed by Tootsie Roll Industries, which acquired it in 2000. It is the largest producer of cotton candy in the United States. The candy is packed in moisture-resistant, airtight bags, to prevent moisture and airborne contaminants from spoiling the product. It is available in popular seasonal varieties, including Snow Balls (December), Cotton Tails (Easter), and Spider Webs (Halloween).

== See also ==
- List of confectionery brands
