= Thrills =

Canadian chewing gum brand

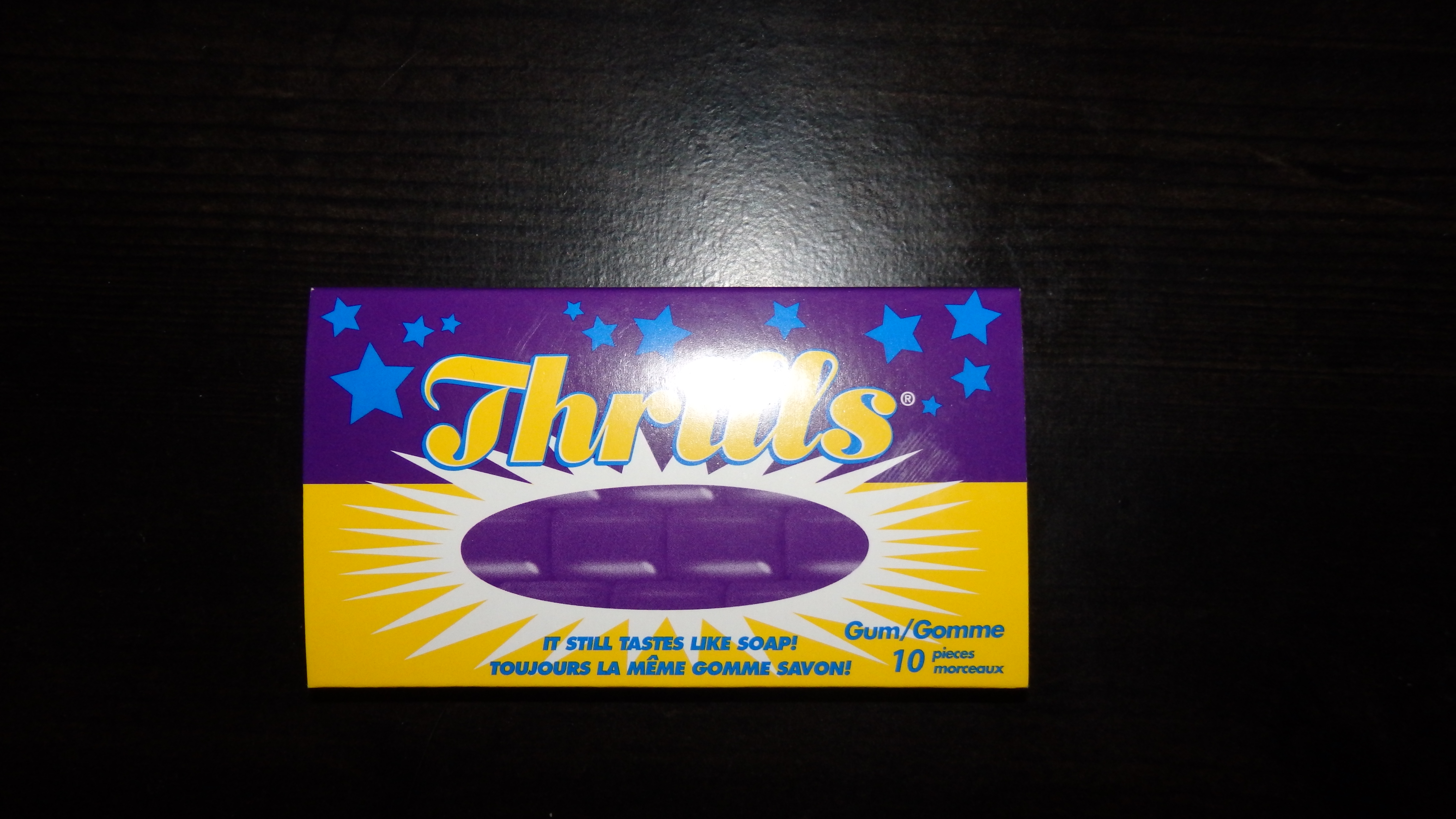
Current Thrills gum packaging.

Thrills is a Canadian brand of chewing gum. It was originally produced by the O-Pee-Chee company of London, Ontario, Canada which was subsequently bought by Nestlé in 1996. It is known for its purple colour and distinctive flavour. Comparisons of its flavour to soap are so prevalent that recent packaging states "IT STILL TASTES LIKE SOAP!".

Thrills once came in a paper envelope or blister pack, but now comes in a cardboard package similar to a Chiclets box. It is now made in Spain for Tootsie Roll Industries. There are ten pieces of gum in each package and each package has the dimensions of 22 x 9.8 x 4.7 cm.
