= Wax lips =

Flavored wax candy

Wax Lips
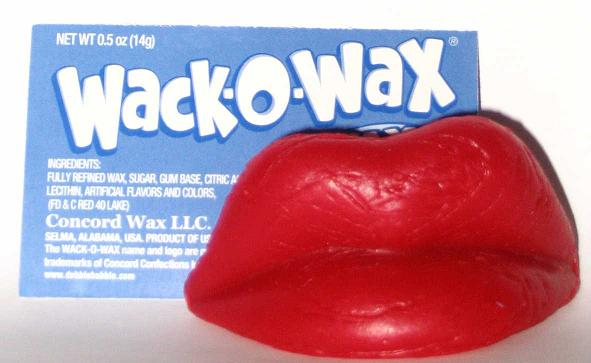
- A pair of Wack-O-Wax lips

Nutritional value per 100 g (3.5 oz)
- Energy: 447.688 kJ (107.000 kcal)
- Carbohydrates: 21 g
- Sugars: 21 g
- Dietary fibre: 0 g
- Fat: 0 g
- Saturated: 0 g
- Trans: 0 g
- Protein: 0 g
Vitamins and minerals
Vitamins	Quantity %DV^{†}
Vitamin A equiv.	0% 0 μg
Vitamin C	0% 0 mg
Minerals	Quantity %DV^{†}
Calcium	0% 0 mg
Sodium	0% 0 mg
Zinc	0% 0 mg
- Amounts converted and rounded to be relative to 14 g serving.
- ^{†}Percentages estimated using US recommendations for adults, except for potassium, which is estimated based on expert recommendation from the National Academies. Source: EatThisMuch

Wack-O-Wax logo

Wax lips are the common name of a confectionery item made of colored and flavored food-grade paraffin wax, molded to resemble a pair of oversized red lips. They were most popular in the 1970s and currently are sold by Tootsie Roll Industries as Wack-O-Wax.

== Description ==
Wax lips are the common name of a confectionery item made of colored and flavored food-grade paraffin wax, molded to resemble a pair of oversized red lips. The lips have a bite plate in the back; when the plate is held between the teeth, the wax lips cover the wearer's own lips, for comic effect. Their popularity among children can be attributed mainly to the comedy of using the candy as a humorous substitute for their own lips. Although they were intended to be used as a chewing gum of sorts after the novelty of the joke wore off, the lips were often simply discarded rather than consumed.

== History ==
Invented by John W. Glenn, founder of J.W. Glenn Co. of Buffalo, New York, some time in the mid-20th century, wax lips became a popular novelty in the United States for many decades, especially during the Halloween season. Wax lips were most popular in the late 1970s and have been referenced extensively in fiction.

The original design of wax lips is proprietary. The patent was obtained by Concord Confections, Ltd. in 2002, which was in turn acquired by Tootsie Roll Industries in 2004. The lips are now produced under the Wack-O-Wax brand name. Other designs include the wax fangs design (which depicts open lips with a mouthful of bloody vampire teeth), black wax moustaches, and horse teeth.

== See also ==
- List of confectionery brands
