= Sugar Daddy (candy) =

Hard caramel candy bar on a stick

A wrapped Sugar Daddy candy

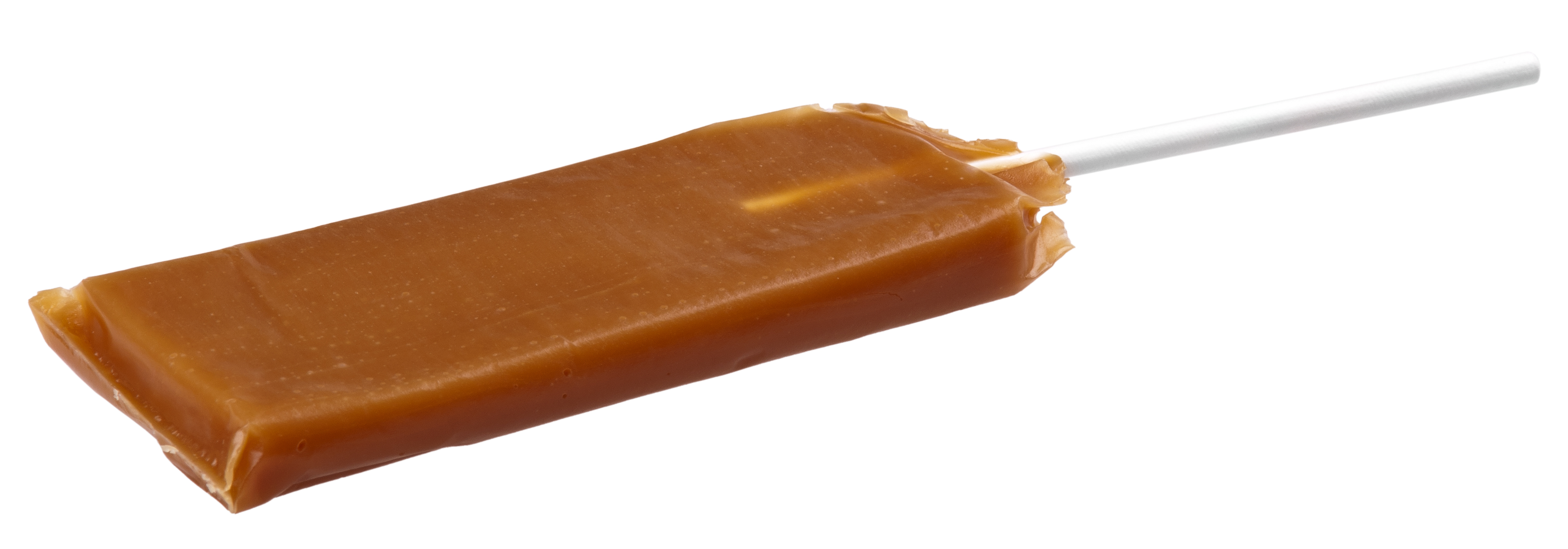
An unwrapped large pop

Sugar Daddy is a sucker manufactured by Tootsie Roll Industries that is essentially a moderately hard brick of caramel similar to a Slo Poke, the "All Day Sucker".

A bite-sized caramel candy based on the Sugar Daddy is marketed under the name Sugar Babies.

== History ==
The Sugar Daddy was created in 1925 by the James O. Welch Company and was originally called Papa Sucker. In 1932, the company changed the candy's name to Sugar Daddy. According to Tootsie Roll Inc, the name change suggested "a wealth of sweetness", though it likely also had to do with the high profile of the term sugar daddy in popular culture. The James O. Welch Company was purchased by Nabisco (now Mondelēz International) in 1963. The Welch brands were sold to Warner-Lambert in 1988; Tootsie Roll Industries acquired them in 1993.

== Nutrition ==
Today, Sugar Daddy candies are produced in two standard sizes: the Junior Pop, with 53 kcal, and the Large Pop, with 200 kcal. For Valentine's Day and Christmas, there are also giant sizes: half-pound with 964 kcal, and one-pound with 1928 kcal.

== See also ==
- List of confectionery brands
- Sugar Babies
- Sugar Mama
