= The Junior Mint =

- Seinfeld episode
- Episode no.: Season 4 Episode 20
- Directed by: Tom Cherones
- Written by: Andy Robin
- Production code: 421
- Original air date: March 18, 1993

Guest appearances
- Susan Walters as Mystery woman; Sherman Howard as Roy; Victor Raider-Wexler as Doctor

Episode chronology
← Previous "The Implant"	Next → "The Smelly Car"
- Seinfeld season 4

"The Junior Mint" is the 60th episode of the NBC sitcom Seinfeld. It is the 20th episode of the fourth season. It aired on March 18, 1993. In this episode, Jerry tries to identify the woman he is dating without asking her name, Elaine reconnects with Roy, a painter she left for being fat, and Jerry and Kramer drop a Junior Mint into Roy's body during surgery. This episode won Michael Richards his first Emmy of the series.

== Plot ==
Jerry has a first date with a woman he met in the grocery store produce aisle, but can't remember her name. George is notified that his forgotten childhood bank savings account has grown to $1,900, and wants to "parlay" it into a "big score". Jerry bought gloves for Kramer's project to put wood texture across his entire apartment, but Kramer complains that kitchen gloves are not fine enough.

Elaine needs to visit ex-boyfriend Roy, a starving artist, who has been hospitalized for a splenectomy. Having left Roy because he is fat, Elaine has Jerry pretend to be her boyfriend, only to find Roy now slim and fit after starving himself out of heartbreak. Elaine disavows Jerry and invites Roy to a big dinner.

Kramer, who came along to plunder hospital gloves, questions Roy's doctor about a 20/20 report on an unsafe retractor. Thinking he is concerned about Roy, the doctor invites everyone to watch Roy's surgery from the operating theater gallery.

George has rented Home Alone to help him understand Home Alone 2, but watches it alone at Jerry's place to feel like he is out and about. Jerry shames him for crying at the movie. George believes Elaine has fallen for the Florence Nightingale effect, but confuses Nightingale for Clara Barton. He brings even more movies to Jerry's.

Jerry insists that he can learn his date's name without asking, but only finds out that she was teased as a child by rhyming her name with a female body part. George brainstorms non-names like "Hest" and "Mulva" for Jerry. Kramer drags Jerry to the splenectomy, where, while the retractor is in place, Jerry fights off Kramer pushing a Junior Mint on him, sending the candy flying off the balcony and into the open incision on Roy.

After no one else notices what happened, the doctors are baffled by Roy's post-surgery prognosis being negative. Kramer forbids Jerry from confessing their guilt, while George, speculating on Roy's death, spends his $1,900 on Roy's paintings of triangles.

Jerry fails to identify his date by searching her purse or having Kramer and George introduce themselves to her, but he is spooked by her offering Junior Mints. When he tries to confess to the hospital, he learns Roy has recovered, sinking George's bet. Roy gratefully credits George's purchase for spurring his recovery, but his doctor speculates that "something from above" intervened to stop Roy's infection. Seeing Roy ravenously gorge himself, Elaine enlists Jerry's help once more to back out of dinner with Roy.

Jerry tries to read his date's name from her copy of Playbill autographed by Olympia Dukakis. She realizes he has been bluffing her all along, and walks out. Jerry finally deduces, too late, that her name is Dolores (rhyming with clitoris).

== Production ==
According to the "Inside Look" from the DVD, the writers had trouble coming up with a name for Jerry's girlfriend, initially settling upon "Cloris." When filming the episode, a comedian would warm up the studio audience in between filming scenes and, as an exercise, asked audience members to guess Jerry's girlfriend's name; one audience member guessed Dolores, which was deemed a better fit than their first choice. Jerry Seinfeld approved of it in time to add it to the script and the scene was shot with that being the character's name. Afterwards, a producer for the show was amused to overhear the audience member's husband saying, "You guessed right!"

Jerry's line concerning Roy, "Then we can go watch 'em slice this fat bastard up," was improvised by Seinfeld.

A York Peppermint Pattie was used for filming the scene in the operating theater, as a Junior Mint was too small for the camera.

== In popular culture ==
The episode was mentioned on the Family Guy episode "E. Peterbus Unum." The scene with the Junior Mint falling into the patient is shown on episode five of The Orville.

The episode was referenced in the case Mackenzie v. Miller Brewing Co., where the plaintiff, Jerold J. Mackenzie, was fired for "poor management judgment" after discussing the episode's references to female sexual anatomy.
