= Sugar Babies (candy) =

Caramel sweets

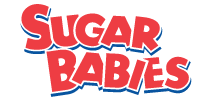

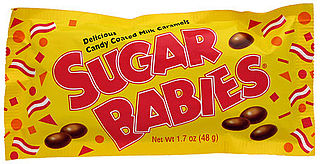
- Bag of Sugar Babies.
- Product type: Chocolate caramel candy
- Current owner: Tootsie Roll Industries
- Produced by: Tootsie Roll Industries
- Country: Cambridge, Massachusetts, U.S.
- Introduced: 1935; 91 years ago
- Related brands: Sugar Daddy (candy); Sugar Mama (confectionery)
- Markets: Worldwide
- Previous owners: James O. Welch Company; Nabisco; Warner–Lambert
- Tagline: "Let me be your sugar"
- Website: www.tootsie.com/candy/sugar-babies/

Sugar Babies are bite-sized, pan-coated, chewy milk caramel sweets in the US which are relatively soft to chew. Tootsie describes them as "slow-cooked, candy-coated milk caramels" sold as movie-theater candy.

== History ==
Sugar Babies are a confection originally developed in 1935 for the James O. Welch Co. by Charles Vaughan (1901-1995), a veteran food chemist who also invented Junior Mints for the James O. Welch Company. Babies were produced in response to the success of the company’s previous Sugar Daddy caramel lollipop, and similar to Highlander Partners’ Milk Duds.

The company was purchased by Nabisco in 1963. The Welch family of products changed hands a few more times, going from Nabisco to Warner-Lambert (in 1988) then to Tootsie Roll in 1993. Presently, packages of Sugar Babies name Charms LLC of Covington, TN, a subsidiary of Tootsie Roll, as manufacturer. Welch produced them along with the rest of the Sugar Family (Sugar Daddy and Sugar Mama).

== See also ==
- List of confectionery brands
