= Nik-L-Nip =

Fruity wax candy sold by Tootsie Roll

Nik-L-Nip logo

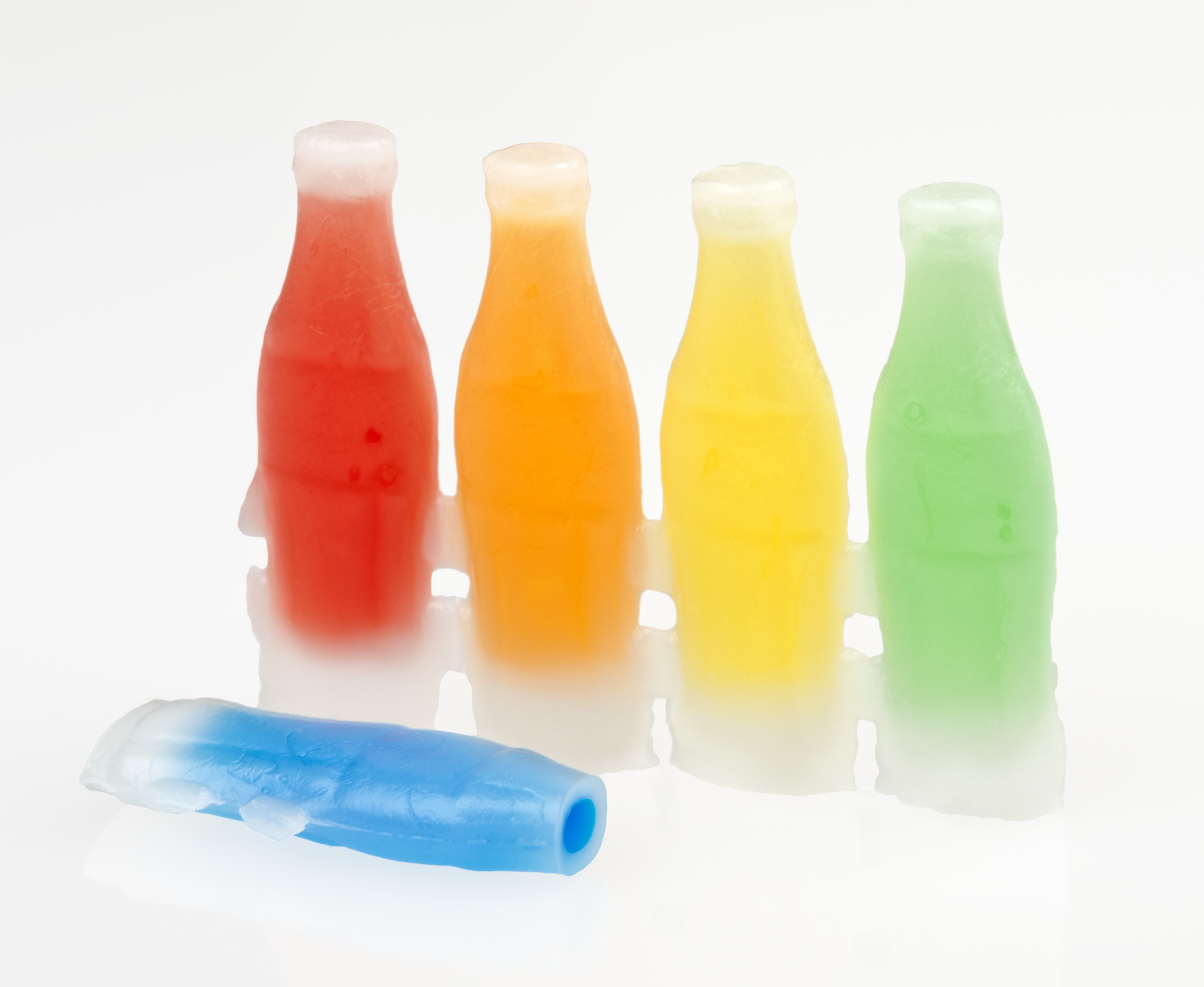
Nik-L-Nip bottles

Nik-L-Nip is a brand of confectionery created in the early 20th century. It comes in a variety of fruit flavors, marketed by Tootsie Roll Industries.

The Nik-L-Nip brand name is a combination of the original cost (a nickel, $0.05) and the candy's resemblance to miniatures of alcohol, known in some regions as "nips". The name may also come from a preferred method of opening the wax bottles, which is to nip (bite) the top off. It has a fruity-tasting liquid flavoring inside of it. Once the top of the small, bottle-shaped wax containers has been bitten off, one can drink the fruit-flavored syrup inside. Afterward the wax can be chewed like gum. The wax in Nik-L-Nip wax bottles is food-grade and non-toxic, although it is meant to be chewed but not swallowed.

== See also ==
- List of confectionery brands
