= Junior Mints =

American candy

- An old box of Junior Mints
- Type: Candy
- Place of origin: United States
- Created by: James O. Welch Company
- Invented: 1949
- Main ingredients: Semi-sweet chocolate
- Ingredients generally used: Mint

Junior Mints are a candy brand consisting of small rounds of mint filling inside a semi-sweet chocolate coating, with a dimple on one side. The mints are produced by Tootsie Roll Industries, and packaged in varying amounts from the so-called 'fun-size box' to the much larger 12 oz. box.

== History ==
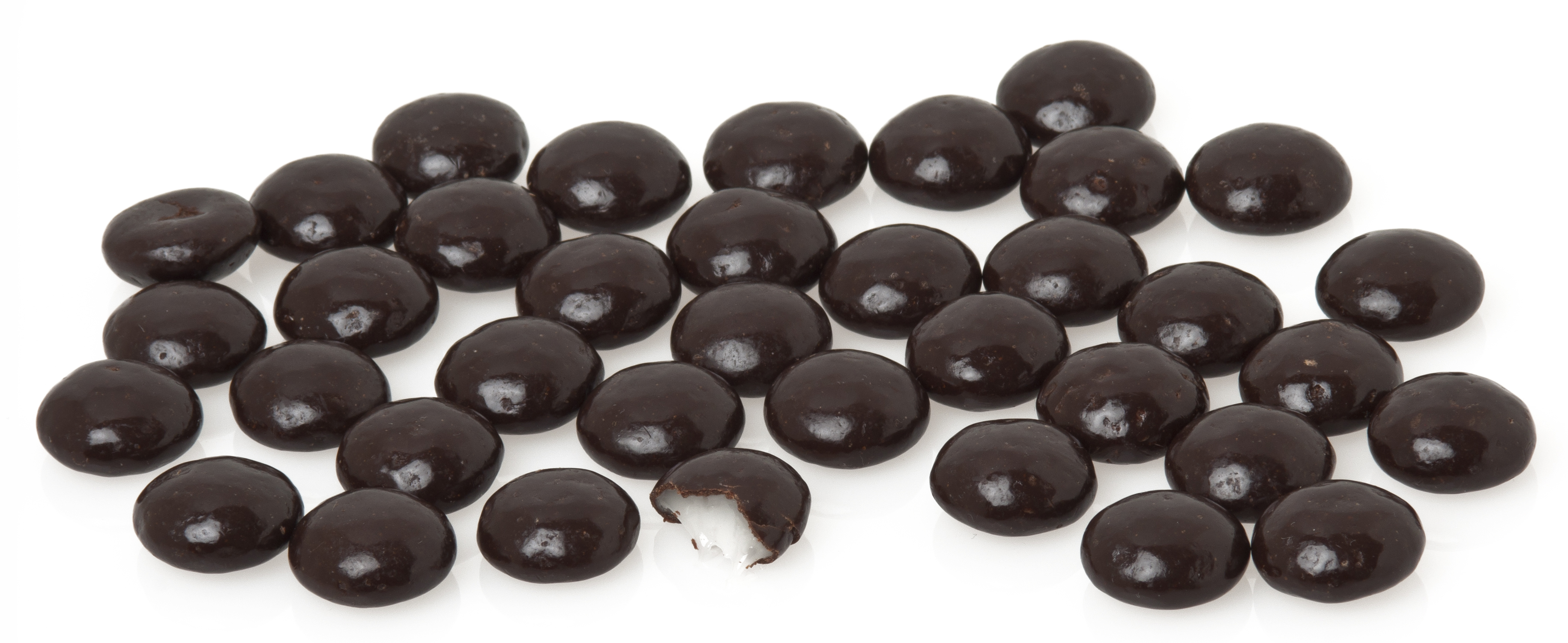
The candy itself

Junior Mints were introduced in 1949 by the Cambridge, Massachusetts–based James O. Welch Company. The company also manufactured candies and candy bars such as Sugar Babies, Welch's Fudge, and Pom Poms. Charles Vaughan (1901–1995), a veteran food chemist and one of the pioneers of pan chocolate, invented both Junior Mints and Sugar Babies for the James O. Welch Company. James Welch asked Charles Vaughan to invent a small, chocolate-covered fondant peppermint.

James O. Welch was born in Hertford, North Carolina, attended the University of North Carolina, and then founded his Cambridge candy company in 1927. His partner in the company was his brother, Robert W. Welch, Jr., who retired from the confectionery business in 1956 and two years later founded the John Birch Society.

In 1963, the brand was acquired by Nabisco, who sold the brand to Warner-Lambert Company (now part of Pfizer) in 1988, who in turn sold the brand to Tootsie Roll in 1993. Today, Junior Mints are still manufactured in the Area 4 neighborhood of Cambridge at a factory of Cambridge Brands, a Tootsie Roll Industries subsidiary. The same factory makes all Sugar Babies and Charleston Chews.

=== Origin of product name ===
The name of the product is a pun on Sally Benson's Junior Miss, a collection of her stories from The New Yorker, which were adapted by Jerome Chodorov and Joseph Fields into a successful play. The play was produced by Max Gordon and directed by Moss Hart and ran on Broadway from 1941 to 1943. According to one past official company history, when James Welch developed and launched the product in 1949, he named the candy after his favorite Broadway show.

== Product ==
Over 15 million Junior Mints are produced daily. Tootsie Roll also makes Junior Caramels (caramel filling with a milk chocolate coating) and limited edition "Inside Outs" (mint-chocolate filling with a white chocolate shell). Other limited edition Junior Mints include Valentine's Day Pastels/Valentine's Day Regulars (not pastel), Easter Pastels,"Spooky Mints" (with red and orange centers for Halloween), Christmas edition (featuring red and green fillings), and Christmas Peppermint Crunch edition (featuring crunchy peppermint flakes in the outer chocolate coating). Junior Mints are sold in various amounts from the fun-size boxes to the movie theater-size boxes, since the product continues to sell well in movie theaters. Junior Mints have traveled throughout the world. They are now certified kosher dairy by the Orthodox Union.

== In popular culture ==
Junior Mints are featured heavily in the Seinfeld episode "The Junior Mint", in which, while observing a surgical procedure, Jerry pushes Kramer’s hand away, causing a Junior Mint to fall into the patient. Later, the Junior Mint is implied to have cured the patient's infection.

== See also ==
- List of chocolate bar brands
- List of confectionery brands
- Poppets (UK equivalent)
