= Razzles =

American candy and chewing gum brand

Razzles

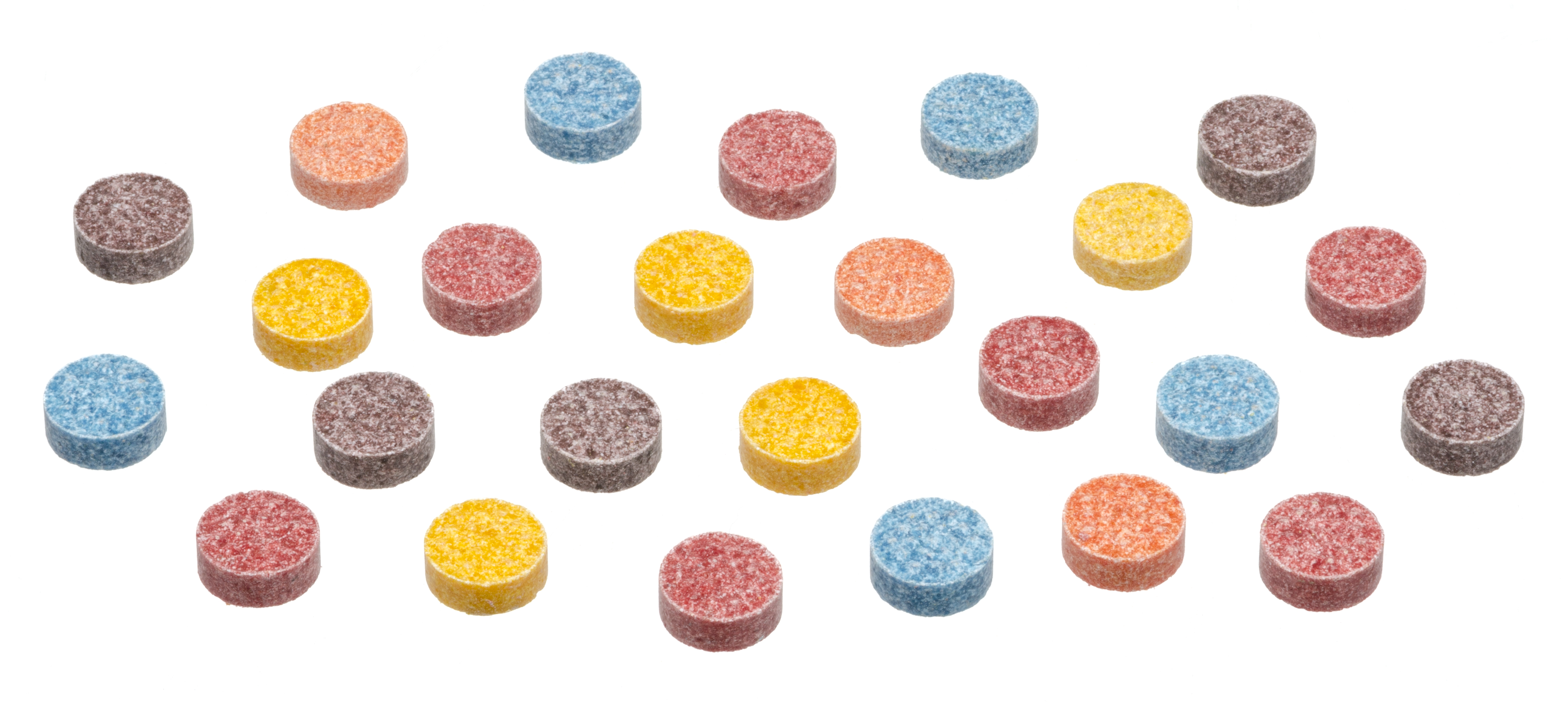

Razzles are a candy that once chewed, mix to transform into chewing gum.

== History ==
Razzles were originally introduced in 1966, with an advertising slogan and jingle of "First it's a candy, then it's a gum. Little round Razzles are so much fun." The original flavor was raspberry. They were named after a fictional flavor, Razzleberry, that was planned but never panned out. This has also happened with the flavor "Zuzzleberry Zash", as well as "Tropical Tash". Concord Confections was formed in 1986, and sometime after that date acquired the Razzles brand. Additional fruit flavors were added to raspberry, such as blueberry, tangerine/orange, lemon, and grape. Most recently, a "tropical fruit" pack and a "sour" pack were added to the product line. Tootsie Roll Industries acquired Concord Confections in 2004. Razzles were first produced by Fleer along with their Dubble Bubble brand; both brands were eventually sold to Concord Confections.

== Cultural references ==
- Razzles are the protagonists' favorite candy in the fantasy-comedy movie 13 Going on 30 (2004).
- In The Venture Bros. episode "Are You There, God? It's Me, Dean", Hank suggests that he give The Monarch a Razzle for his birthday, and also that it should count as two gifts, because "First it's a candy, then it's a gum!"
- In the American Dad! episode "Crotchwalkers", Julian, the owner of the candy shop where Steve attempts to shoplift, admits that he pays a prostitute in Razzles to sleep with him at night.
- In The Walking Dead episode "Time for After", Eugene Porter wishes that he had some Razzles, but comments on how wishes do not make things happen.
- In the Psych episode "Not Even Close... Encounters", Henry Spencer reads an expenses list and one of the items listed is 22 packs of Razzles.

== See also ==
- List of confectionery brands
