= Mackenzie v. Miller Brewing Co. =

- Court: Wisconsin Supreme Court
- Full case name: Jerold J. Mackenzie v. Miller Brewing Company and Robert L. Smith, Patricia G. Best
- Decided: March 20, 2001
- Citation: 2001 WI 23; 241 Wis.2d 700; 623 N.W.2d 739

Case history
- Appealed from: Mackenzie v. Miller Brewing Co., 2000 WI App 48, 234 Wis. 2d 1, 608 N.W.2d 331

Mackenzie v. Miller Brewing Co. was a 2001 case relating to employment law. It is sometimes known as the "Seinfeld case".

== Background ==
Mackenzie was employed by Miller. His highest position was ranked "Grade Level 14". During a reorganization in 1987, his responsibility was decreased, but he retained the same grade level. In 1989, the role was downgraded to 13, but Mackenzie, along with others, was grandfathered. In 1992 his grade level was dropped, and he lost the right to participate in the company's equity plan, though he continued to receive the same salary. Mackenzie claimed that he was given the impression that he was looked on favorably, while in fact evidence showed that his boss thought he was unsuitable for promotion.

In 1993, a colleague complained that Mackenzie had made numerous comments about an episode of Seinfeld ("The Junior Mint"), which contained many double entendres.

Mackenzie was fired for "poor managerial judgement." Wisconsin is an "at will" state.

== Hearing ==
Mackenzie claimed damages in Milwaukee, on the basis that Miller had misled him about his prospects and standing with the company, thereby inducing him to remain under its employ past the age where he could reasonably expect a successful career path elsewhere.

The jury awarded him $6.5 million for compensatory and $18 million in punitive damages.

== Appeal ==
In a majority verdict of Charles B. Schudson and Ralph Adam Fine, the damages awarded by the trial court were partially overturned in the District I Court of Appeals. In particular, the court decided that there was no action in tort over the company's alleged misrepresentation of Mackenzie's standing in the company. Mackenzie appealed again to the Wisconsin Supreme Court, which upheld the Court of Appeals' ruling.
