= Caramel apple =

Apple covered with caramel and sometimes nuts

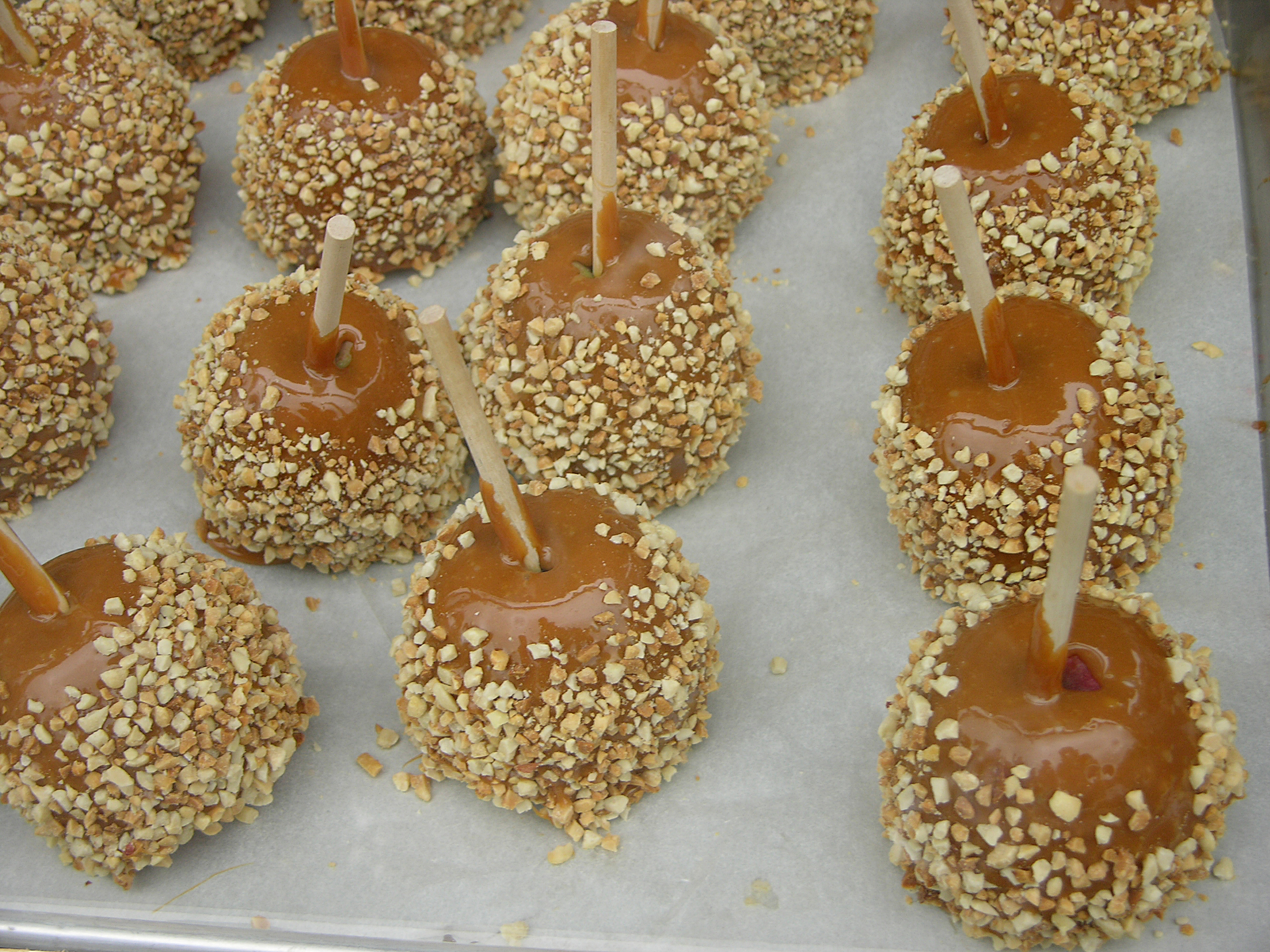
- Caramel apple with peanuts
- Alternative names: Toffee apples, taffy apples
- Type: Confectionery
- Place of origin: United States
- Created by: Hunter's Candy
- Main ingredients: Apples, caramel, sometimes nuts

Caramel apples or toffee apples are whole apples covered in a layer of caramel. They are created by dipping or rolling apples on a stick in hot caramel, sometimes rolling them in nuts or other toppings, and allowing them to cool. When these additional ingredients, such as nut toppings, are added, the caramel apple can be called a taffy apple.

== Production ==
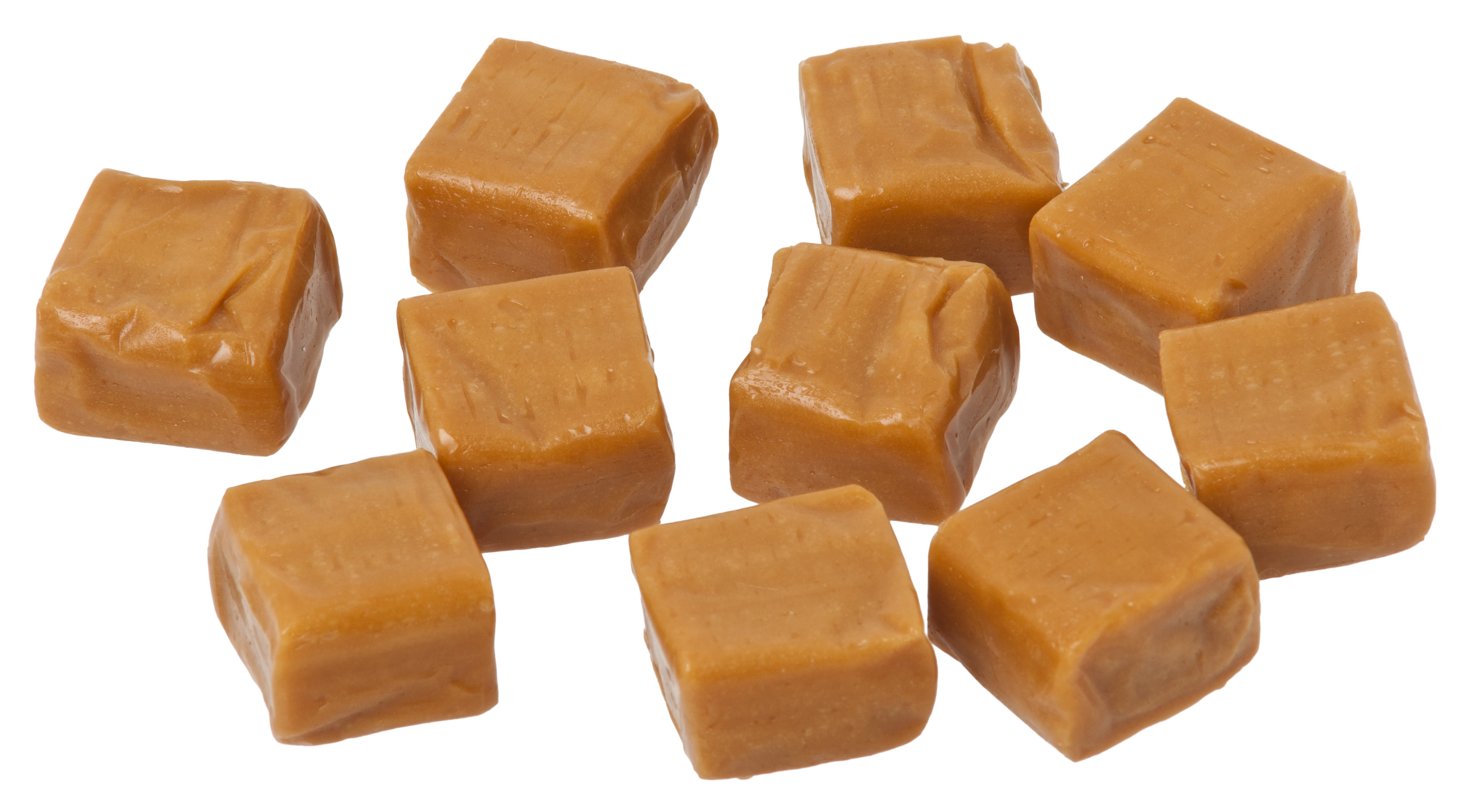
Bags of caramels are commonly sold during the fall months in America for making caramel apples.

For high-volume production of caramel apples, a sheet of caramel can be wrapped around the apple, followed by heating the apple to melt the caramel evenly onto it. This creates a harder caramel that is easier to transport but more difficult to eat. Making caramel apples at home usually involves melting pre-purchased caramel candy or making fresh caramel using corn syrup, brown sugar, butter, and vanilla. Homemade caramel generally results in a softer, creamier coating.

In recent years, it has become increasingly popular to decorate caramel apples for holidays like Halloween. Instead of the usual brown caramel dipping, during Halloween, decorations can include apples dipped in white or milk chocolate, or painting designs onto finished apples using sugar or food coloring.

Classically, the preferred apples for use in caramel apples are tart-tasting apples with a crisp texture such as Granny Smith.

== History ==
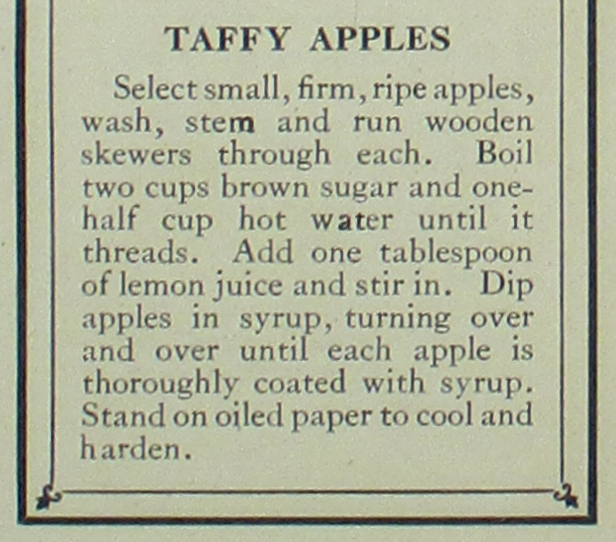
An early candy apple recipe from a 1923 book on children's parties. The recipe uses a brown sugar caramel glaze.

Hunter's Candy in Moscow, Idaho began selling caramel apples in 1936. Hard-coated candy apples had been around since the late 19th century, but Hunter's Candy created a new treat by coating the apples with their caramel. During World War II, these apples were shipped overseas to soldiers in Korea, Japan, and England.

In 1948, the Kastrup family founded The Affy Tapple Company in Chicago. The recipe for their caramel apples came from Edna Kastrup and is still used today for their "The Original Caramel Apple" line.

In 1960, Vito Raimondi patented the first automatic caramel apple making machine, replacing much of the process that involved production by hand.

== See also ==
- Candy apple (also known as a "toffee apple" outside North America)
- Caramel Apple Pops
- List of apple dishes
