= Florence Nightingale effect =

Psychological effect in which a patient falls in love with a caregiver

The Florence Nightingale effect is a trope where a caregiver falls in love with their patient, even if very little communication or contact takes place outside of basic care. Feelings may fade once the patient is no longer in need of care.

== Origin ==
The effect is named for Florence Nightingale, a pioneer in the field of nursing in the second half of the 19th century. Due to her dedication to patient care, she was dubbed "The Lady with the Lamp" because of her habit of making rounds at night, previously not done. Her care would forever change the way hospitals treated patients. Most consider Nightingale the founder of modern nursing. There is no record of her having ever fallen in love with one of her patients. In fact, despite multiple suitors, she never married for fear it might interfere with her calling for nursing. Albert Finney referred to the effect as the "Florence Nightingale syndrome" in a 1982 interview, and that phrase was used earlier to refer to health workers pursuing non-tangible rewards in their careers.

== In popular culture ==
In the film Back to the Future, Dr. Emmett Brown refers to this effect to explain the infatuation of Marty's mother, Lorraine, with the man who would be his father, when taking care of him for one night after her father's car struck George.

The effect is also referenced in Seinfeld episode "The Junior Mint".
