= Tootsie Pop =

American candy

Tootsie Pops logo

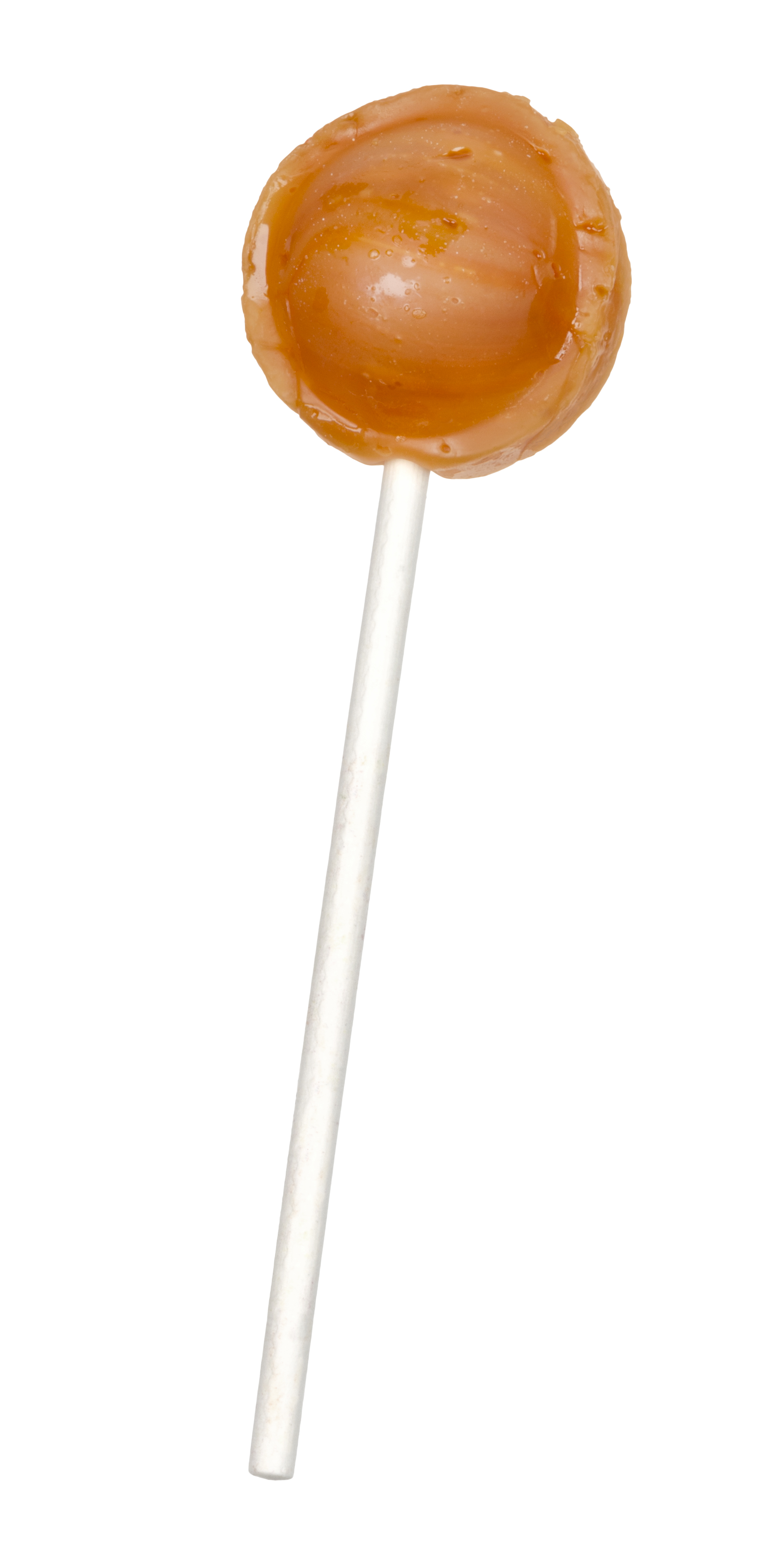
An orange-flavored Tootsie Roll Pop

A Tootsie Pop (also called a Tootsie Roll Pop, and known in Latin America as a Tutsi Chupa Pop) is a hard candy lollipop filled with a chocolate-flavored chewy Tootsie Roll candy. They were invented in 1931 by an employee of The Sweets Company of America. Tootsie Rolls had themselves been invented in 1896 by Leo Hirschfield. The company changed its name to Tootsie Roll Industries in 1969. The candy made its debut in 1931 and since then various flavors have been introduced. The idea came to be when a man who worked at The Sweets Company of America licked his daughter's lollipop at the same time he was chewing his Tootsie Roll. He loved the idea and pitched it to everyone at the next snack ideas meeting.

In 2002, 60 million Tootsie Rolls and 20 million Tootsie Pops were produced every day.

== Commercials ==
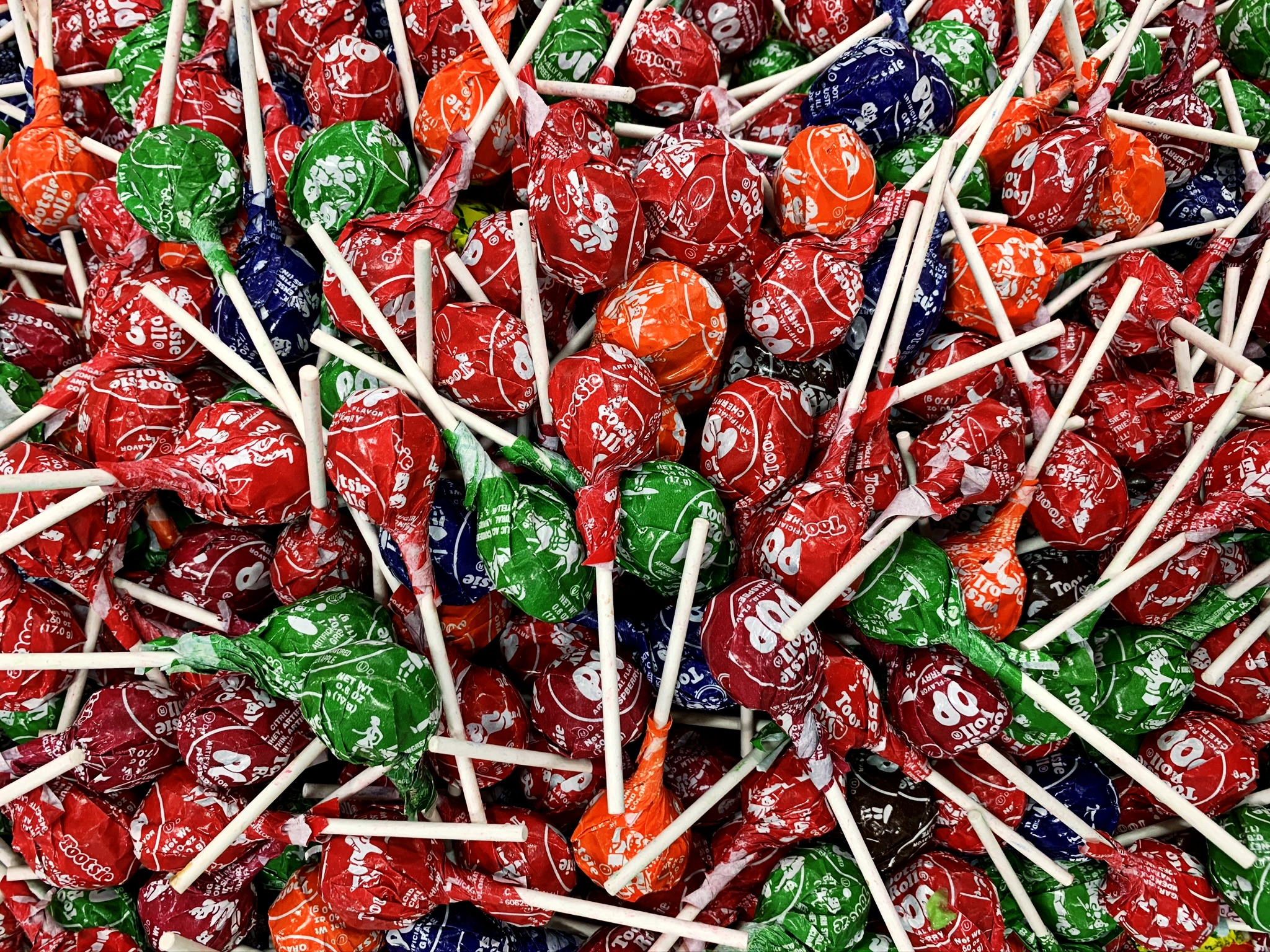
Various wrapped Tootsie Roll Pops

The "How Many Licks" commercial

Tootsie Pops are known for the catchphrase "How many licks does it take to get to the Tootsie Roll center of a Tootsie Pop?" The phrase was first introduced in an animated commercial which debuted on US television in 1970. In the original television ad created by Eugene Azzam of W.B. Doner of Detroit, MI, a questioning boy (voiced by Buddy Foster) poses the question to a cow (voiced by Frank Nelson), a fox (voiced by Paul Frees), a turtle (voiced by Ralph James), and an owl (voiced by Paul Winchell). Each one of the first three animals tells the kid to ask someone else, explaining that they would bite a Tootsie Pop every time they lick one. Eventually, he asks the owl, who offers to investigate. He starts licking the orange Tootsie Pop, but bites into it after only three licks. ("A-one, a two-hoo, three... (CRUNCH!) Three!") The child walks away, saying to himself, "If there's anything I can't stand, it's a smart owl." The commercial ends the same way, with various flavored Tootsie Pops unwrapped and being "licked away" until being crunched in the center with Herschel Bernardi asking, "How many licks does it take to get to the Tootsie Roll center of a Tootsie pop? The world may never know."

While the original commercial is 60 seconds long, an edited 30-second version and 15-second version of this commercial are the ones that have aired innumerable times over the years to this day, and is the longest-running TV commercial in US history.

In the shorter 30-second ad, Mr. Owl returns the spent candy stick, and the boy's final line is replaced with him frowning at the empty stick.

The 15-second version of the commercial only shows the boy with Mr. Owl, and a different narrator (Frank Leslie) speaks the same concluding line (this time without mentioning "Tootsie Roll" in the sentence), but without the scene showing the Tootsie Roll pops slowly disappearing with an APM Music track "Crepe Suzette" (composed by Cyril Watters) playing in the background.

In the late 1990s, a new commercial was made featuring a boy asking a giant robot and a dragon how many licks it takes to get to the center, with the catchphrase being shortened to "How many licks to the center of a Tootsie Pop?" instead of "How many licks does it take to get to the Tootsie Roll center of a Tootsie Pop?" In September 2025, the 30-second version of the original commercial was reanimated in 16:9, with the voices being re-recorded by new actors and the boy now wearing clothes.

== Rumors and set attempts ==
=== Redeemable wrappers ===
At some point, a rumor began that the lollipop wrappers which bore three unbroken circles were redeemable for free candy or even free items like shirts and other goods. The rumor was untrue, but some shops have honored the wrapper offer over the years, allowing people to "win" a free pop.

Some stores redeemed lollipop wrappers with the "shooting star" (bearing an image of a child dressed as a Native American aiming a bow and arrow at a star) for a free lolipop. This was clearly up to the store owner and not driven by the lollipop manufacturer. One convenience store in Iowa City, Iowa, for example, gave candy away when the children asked. Also, in Cedar Rapids, Iowa, Osco Drug used to give children free lollipops for star wrappers. In 1994, the owner of Dan's Shortstop told a reporter that when he first opened children came by often, but after a while, he said he had to stop giving things away. Giveaways also occurred in Chico, California, where a 7-Eleven store manager in the Pleasant Valley area, said she had to stop because it had become too expensive. Since 1982, Tootsie Roll Industries has been distributing a "consolation prize", the short story "The Legend of the Indian Wrapper", to children who mail in their Indian star wrappers.

=== Lick tests ===
A student study by Purdue University concluded that it took an average of 365 licks to get to the center of a Tootsie Pop using a "licking machine", while it took an average of 253 licks when tried by 20 students. Yet another study by the University of Michigan concluded that it takes 412 licks to get to the center of a Tootsie Pop. A 1996 study by undergraduate students at Swarthmore College concluded that it takes a median of 146 licks (range 70–222) to get to the center of a Tootsie Pop.

In 2014, the Tribology Laboratory at the University of Florida published a study examining the coupled effects of biology, corrosion, and mechanical agitation on the wear of Tootsie Roll Pops. Self-reported wear data from 58 participants was used in conjunction with statistical analysis of actual lollipop cross-sectional information in a numerical simulation to compute the average number of licks required to reach the Tootsie Roll center of a Tootsie Roll Pop. The number of licks required to reach the center, based on equatorial cross-section data, was found to be nearly independent of the licking style with the one-sided approach requiring 195±18 licks and the full-surface approach requiring 184±33. Detailed examination of the lollipops indicates that the minimum candy shell thickness is rarely (if ever) located along the equator. Using the global minimum distance resulted in a calculated 130±29 licks to reach the center, independent of licking style.

== Flavors ==
=== Standard ===
- Cherry
- Chocolate
- Grape
- Orange
- Red Raspberry

=== Tropical Stormz ===
- Citrus Punch
- blue berry bear beary
- Lemon/Lime
- Orange/Pineapple
- Tangerine
- Tropical Punch
- Fruit Punch
- Pineapple

=== "Wild Berry" assortment ===
- Wild Apple Berry
- Wild Blueberry
- Wild Cherry Berry
- Wild Mango Berry
- Wild Blackberry

=== Non-standard ===
- Pomegranate (rotated as a "sixth flavor" in 2012)
- Blueberry (rotated as a "sixth flavor" in 2011)
- Lemon-Lime (rotated as a "sixth flavor" in 2004)
- Blue Raspberry (rotated as a "sixth Flavor" in 2004)
- Watermelon (rotated as a "sixth flavor" in 2004)
- Strawberry (rotated as a "sixth flavor" in 2004)
- Strawberry-Watermelon (rotated as a "sixth flavor" in 2015)

Non-standard flavors can be now purchased in single-flavor bulk.

Additional flavors: Green Apple, Black Cherry, Strawberry-Kiwi, Tangerine, Pineapple, Mango, Banana, Lemon, and Strawberry Watermelon lemon/watermelon vanilla Strawberry/Banana .

=== Seasonal ===
- Candy Cane (Christmas seasonal flavor, also available as Pop Drops)
- Peppermint (Christmas Flavor)
- Caramel (Halloween seasonal flavor, but seems to be sold all year)
- Strawberry-Vanilla, Cherry (Valentine's Day)

=== "Sweet & Sour Bunch" pops ===
The "Sweet & Sour Bunch" flavors came in a package of eight Assortment pops, at .50 oz. / 14.8 grams each.

- Sour Apple
- Sour Blackberry
- Sour Blue Raspberry
- Sour Lemon
- Sweet Cherry
- Sweet Grape
- Sweet Orange
- Sweet Raspberry

=== Tootsie Fruit Chews Pops ===
Hard candy matched with a complementary Tootsie Fruit Chew flavor core.

- Orange Pop/Lime Center
- Strawberry Pop/Lemon Center
- Lemon Lime Pop/Orange Center
- Blue Raspberry Pop/Cherry Center

== Sister products ==
- Tootsie Rolls – the original Tootsie candy on which Tootsie Pops were based
- Tootsie Pop Drops – Smaller Tootsie Pops candy without the stick, made to be portable and often sold in a pocket package.
  - Pop Drops Assortment: Blue Raspberry, Cherry, Chocolate, Orange, and Grape
  - Candy Cane Pop Drops (seasonal)
- Caramel Apple Pops – flat lollipop of apple-flavored hard candy, coated with a chewy caramel layer
  - Caramel Apple Pops (original flavor: Green Apple a.k.a. Granny Smith)
  - Caramel Apple Orchard Pops (three flavors: Red Macintosh, Green Apple, Golden Delicious)
- Charms Blow Pops – Tootsie Pops with bubble gum in the center, instead of a Tootsie Roll
  - Charms Blow Pops Assortment: Cherry, Sour Apple, Grape, Watermelon, Strawberry, Blue Raspberry
  - Super Blow Pops
  - Blow Pops Minis
  - Way-2-Sour Blow Pops

== See also ==
- List of confectionery brands
