= Bernard D. Rubin =

American businessman (1893–1948)

- Born: February 18, 1893; New York City, New York
- Died: July 6, 1948 (age 55); New York City, New York
- Known for: CEO of Sweets Company of America

Bernard Daniel Rubin (February 18, 1893 – July 6, 1948), also known as Bert Rubin, was an American businessman who was the president and chief executive officer of Sweets Company of America, makers of the famous Tootsie Rolls, from 1936 to his death in July 1948.

== Biography ==
Rubin was born to a Jewish family in Manhattan's Lower East Side in 1893, the second of seven children. His parents emigrated from Hungary. He attended public school in Brooklyn but left before completing high school to join his father's paper-box manufacturing business. In 1917–1919 he served in the American Expeditionary Force in France.

Until 1935 he worked alongside his younger brother, William B. Rubin, in their father's business. When the Rubins learned that Sweets Co., one of their major customers, was in serious difficulty, they became interested in acquiring control of the company. The company was listed on the New York Stock Exchange, but Bernard Rubin acquired a list of shareholders and approached them in person in order to purchase their shares. The Rubins eventually achieved control and agreed that Bernard would run the company as president.

He changed the formula for Tootsie Rolls and increased its size. He moved the manufacturing plant from West 45th Street in Manhattan to Hoboken, New Jersey, in 1938. He guided the company successfully through the war years, despite increasing difficulties in accessing the necessary raw materials. Not only did the company survive this critical period, but at his death its volume had increased from about $1 million in 1935 to more than $12 million in 1947.

During World War I, he served overseas in the U.S. Army Motor Transport Corps from January 1918 to April 1919.

As a philanthropist, he was active with the Federation of Jewish Philanthropies and the United Jewish Appeal. Rubin died of cardiac arrest in Manhattan, aged 55.
