= James O. Welch Company =

American confectionery manufacturer

- Industry: Food processing
- Founded: 1927
- Defunct: 1963
- Fate: Acquired by Nabisco
- Headquarters: Cambridge, Massachusetts, United States
- Products: Confectionery
- Owner: James O. Welch (1906-1985)

James O. Welch Company was an American confectionery manufacturer. James O. Welch (1906–1985) founded the company bearing his name in Cambridge, Massachusetts, in 1927. The company introduced many enduring brands, including Junior Mints, Sugar Daddys, and Sugar Babies. Other candies they produced were Welch's Fudge, Welch's Frappé, Pom Poms, and Sugar Mamas.

James O. Welch Company was purchased by the National Biscuit Company (now Nabisco) in 1963. Welch served as a director of Nabisco from 1963 until 1978, and his son, James O. Welch Jr. (1931-2019) became president of Nabisco when it became part of Nabisco Brands and CEO and chairman of Nabisco Brands when it became part of RJR Nabisco. The Welch brands were sold to Warner-Lambert in 1988; Tootsie Roll Industries acquired them in 1993.

Following the collapse of his own confectionery company, the Oxford Candy Company, during the Great Depression in the United States, James O. Welch's brother, Robert W. Welch, Jr., joined the James O. Welch Company. He stayed with the company until 1956. He used his wealth from the family candy companies to found the right-wing political advocacy group the John Birch Society in 1958.
