= Charleston Chew =

Candy bar

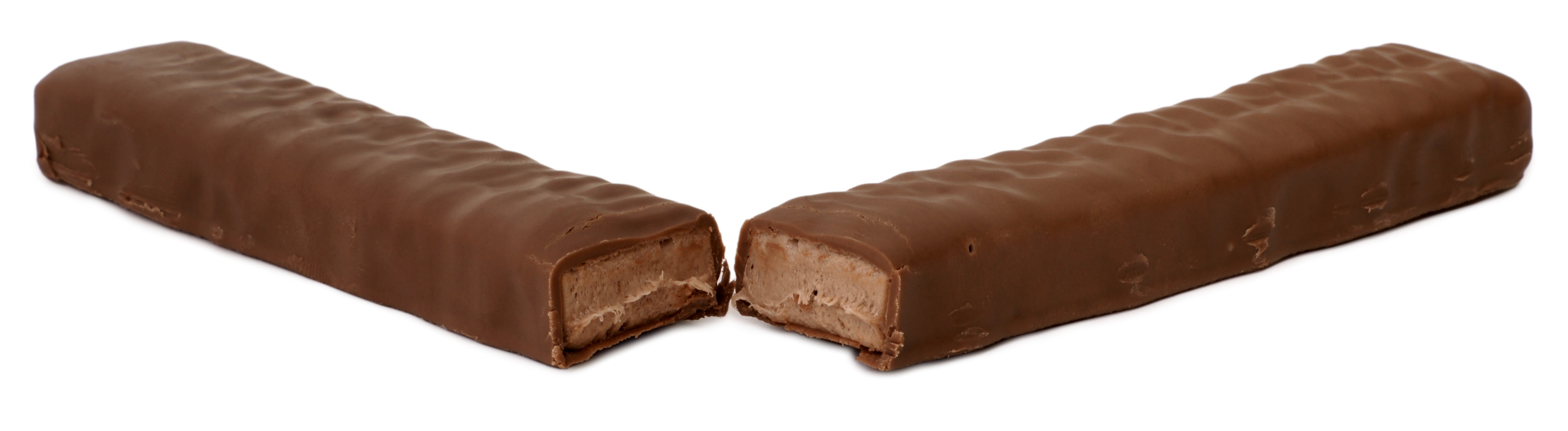
- A chocolate Charleston Chew split in half

Nutritional value per 100 g (3.5 oz)
- Energy: 1,761.46 kJ (421.00 kcal)
- Carbohydrates: 82 g
- Sugars: 58 g
- Dietary fibre: 0 g
- Fat: 12 g
- Saturated: 7.9 g
- Trans: 0 g
- Protein: 2.6 g
Vitamins and minerals
Vitamins	Quantity %DV^{†}
Vitamin C	0% 0 mg
Minerals	Quantity %DV^{†}
Calcium	4% 53 mg
Iron	5%.95 mg
Sodium	3% 66 mg
- Amounts converted and rounded to be relative to 38 g serving.
- ^{†}Percentages estimated using US recommendations for adults. Source: Nutrition Value

Charleston Chew is a candy bar consisting of marshmallow flavored nougat covered in chocolate flavor coating.

== History ==
Vanilla Charleston Chew

Charleston Chew

The Charleston Chew was created in 1922 by the Fox-Cross Candy Company, founded by stage actor Donley Cross and his friend Charlie Fox. The candy was named after the Charleston, a popular dance at that time. Fox-Cross was purchased in 1957 by Nathan Sloane, who increased production and moved the company to a new factory in Everett, Massachusetts. He also introduced chocolate and strawberry flavor variants in the 1970s.

In 1980, Fox-Cross Candy Company was sold to Nabisco. The factory in Everett was closed in 1985 and production was moved to a Nabisco facility in Cambridge, Massachusetts. In February 1988, Warner-Lambert acquired a number of confectionary brands from RJR Nabisco, including Charleston Chew, Junior Mints, and Sugar Daddy. The candies were integrated into the American Chicle Group.

Tootsie Roll Industries purchased Warner-Lambert's chocolate-caramel division for $82 million in 1993, taking ownership of Charleston Chews and other candies. The Cambridge facility continues to be the sole source of the world's Charleston Chews.

== Flavors and varieties ==
The candy is available in vanilla, chocolate, and strawberry flavors. At one time, there were three additional flavours; banana, grape, and cherry. "Mini Charleston Chews" are a bite-sized, similarly-shaped version of the candy bar, introduced in 1998. The original packaging for Charleston Chews was a grey box that had the brand name in a small red font at the bottom of the box.

== In science and technology demonstrations ==
Charleston Chew candy bars have been used to demonstrate rheology to students in North American university geology labs.

== In popular culture ==
- In the 1999 song “Forgot About Dre” by Dr. Dre and Eminem, Eminem raps the line “And I’m still loco enough to choke you to death with a Charleston Chew.”
- In the adult animated sitcom The Life & Times of Tim, Charleston Chew is frequently mentioned throughout the series, as the favorite food of main protagonist, Tim. When asked what would be Tim's epitaph, Steve Dildarian, the show's creator, replied: "Probably something like, 'Here lies Tim. He loved Charleston Chews.'"
- In the animated sci-fi TV series Futurama, Charleston Chew is frequently mentioned (and advertised) by the head of Richard Nixon, who is the President of Earth.
