= Dots (candy) =

American brand of gum drops

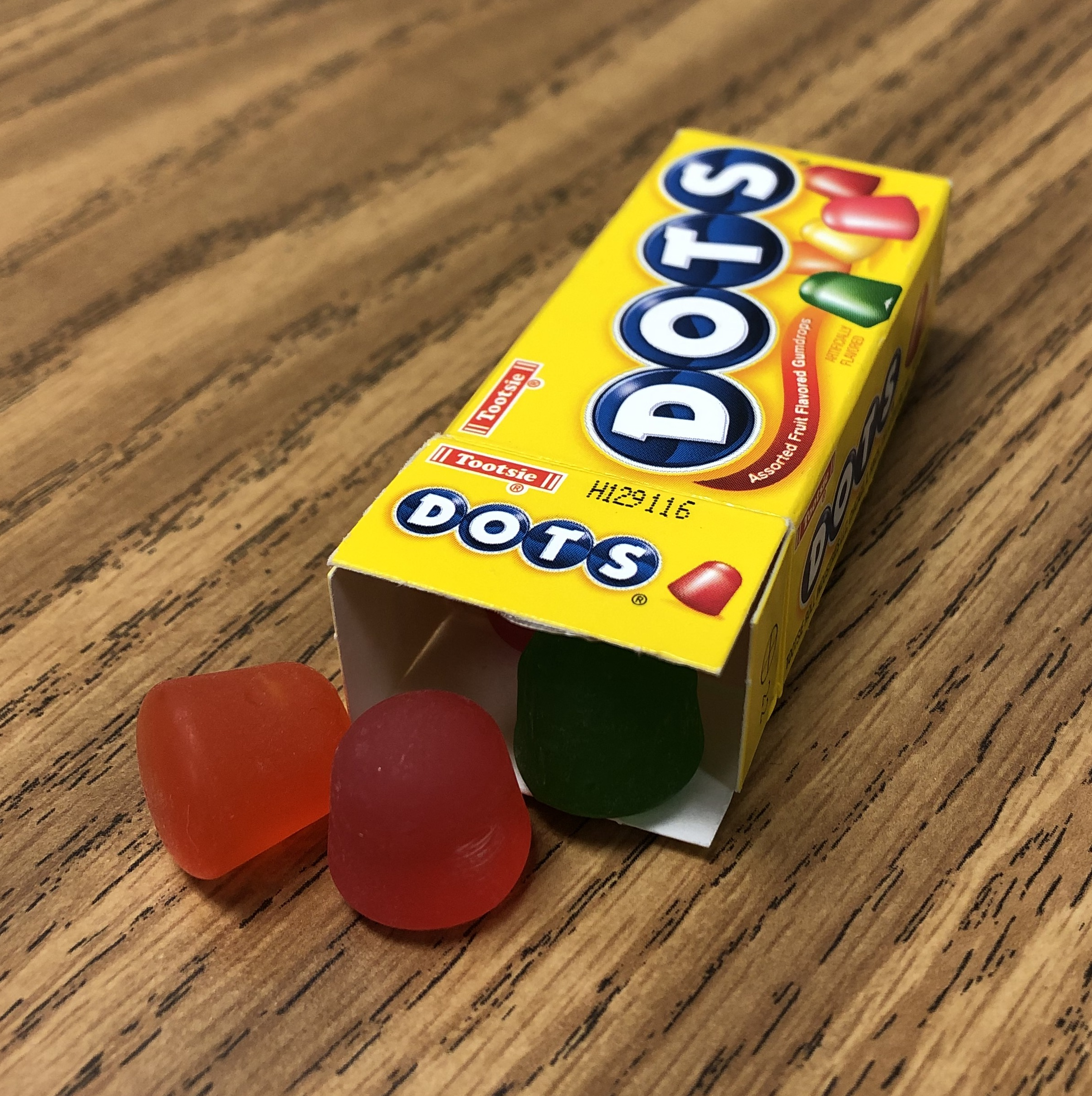
- A six-pack box of Dots
- Alternative names: DOTS or Mason Dots
- Type: Gum drops
- Place of origin: United States
- Invented: 1945
- Main ingredients: Corn syrup, sugar
- Ingredients generally used: Food starch, malic acid, sodium citrate, flavors and color
- Variations: See below
- Food energy (per 8 Dots. serving): 100 kcal (420 kJ)
- Similar dishes: Crows

Dots, or Mason Dots (trademarked DOTS), is an American brand of gum drops marketed by Tootsie Roll Industries. According to advertisements, more than four billion Dots are produced from the Tootsie Roll Industries Chicago plant each year. Dots are vegan, gluten-free, nut-free, peanut-free, halal, and kosher. They come in various flavors and varieties.

== History ==
Dots gum drops were introduced in 1945 by Mason and trademarked that year. In 1972, Tootsie Roll Industries acquired the Dots brand by purchasing the Mason Division of Candy Corporation of America. Prior to that acquisition they were manufactured by Mason, AU and Magenheimer Confectionery Manufacturing Company of Brooklyn and later Mineola, New York. According to advertisements, more than four billion dots are produced from the Tootsie Roll Industries Chicago plant each year. Tootsie Roll Industries claims that "since its 1945 launch," the candy has become "America's...#1 selling gumdrop brand".

Crows are the oldest candy in the Dots family, first created in the late 19th century. Original dots date back to 1945, Tropical Dots to 2003, and Yogurt Dots to 2007. Sour Dots were introduced in 2009–2010.

== Flavors and varieties ==
=== Flavors ===
Current flavors for "Original Dots" include cherry (red), lemon (yellow), lime (green), orange (orange), and strawberry (pink). Sour Dots have five flavors, and are created with citric acid: cherry, lemon, orange, grape, and green apple. Flavors for Tropical Dots include Island Nectar, Wild Mango, Grapefruit Cooler, Carambola Melon, and Paradise Punch; and for Yogurt Dots, Banana, Orange, Blackberry, and Lemon-Lime.

Crows, black licorice flavored gum drops, are also considered to be part of the Dots family, created in the 1890s by confectioners Ernest Von Au and Joseph Maison. There is an urban legend that Crows were supposed to be called "Black Rose", but the printer misheard the name as "Black Crows" and printed wrappers with the wrong name on them. However, research—including the fact that the name was copyrighted before the candies ever came with wrappers—reveals that this story is not true.

=== Varieties ===
In addition, to current varieties of Original Dots (also known as Mason Dots), Tropical Dots, Yogurt Dots, Sour Dots, and Crows, past varieties (including special short-term promotional offerings) have included:

==== Halloween specialties ====
Three special Halloween varieties of Dots have been marketed:

- Ghost Dots are translucent light green, with the same flavors of Original Dots, but without the different colors to indicate which flavor any particular gum drop might have.
- Bat Dots are black-colored Dots that are blood orange flavored.
- Candy Corn Dots are candy corn flavored and resemble candy corn.

==== Other holiday specialties ====
Other holiday specialties have included:

- Christmas Dots, which have a Vanilla (white) top with either a Cherry (red) or Lime (green) base. These were replaced with Holiday Dots, which were either Cherry/Green Apple (red top/green base) or Lime/Strawberry (green top/red base) for the 2023 holiday season.
- Lumps of Coal Dots in Blackberry (black) and Black Cherry (dark red) (introduced during the 2023 holiday season)
- Valentine Dots, which have a Vanilla (white) base with either a Cherry (red) or Passion Fruit (pink) top
- Cherry Lover's Dots, which is a box of all red Cherry Dots.
- Easter Dots in Blueberry (blue), Lemon (yellow), Lime (green), Cherry (red), and Orange (orange) (introduced in 2010)
- Springtime Dots in Grape (purple), Mango (orange), Strawberry (pink) and Pineapple (yellow) (introduced in 2024)

==== Other varieties and flavors ====
Other varieties and flavors have included:

- During the 1980s, there was a variety of Dots called Spice Dots.
- Wild Berry Dots were introduced in 2000. Wild Berry Dots are sweet, chewy gumdrops coated with a tart, crunchy coating. Wild Berry Dots were discontinued in 2007.
- Dots Elements in pomegranate (earth, purple), cinnamon (fire, red), green tea (water, green), and wintergreen (air, teal) (introduced in 2008; no longer being produced)
- Hot Dots (a.k.a. Cinnamon Dots) were released in 2004, but were discontinued in 2006.
- Patriotic Dots, which have a vanilla (white) top with either a strawberry (red) or blueberry (blue) base
- Assorted Reds Dots, in strawberry, cherry and fruit punch flavors
- Special individual flavor packages such as Pink Grapefruit, Peach, and Watermelon. Marketed as "sour slices", they maintain the gumdrop shape of all other Dots.
- In 2022, Watermelon Dots were introduced, featuring a red top and green base to mimic the look of a watermelon.
- Assorted Lemonade Dots, in lemonade, blue raspberry lemonade, cherry lemonade, strawberry lemonade, and limeade flavors, were introduced in 2023.

== Ingredients ==
Dots contain: Corn syrup, sugar, food starch-modified, malic acid, natural and artificial flavors, sodium citrate, and artificial colors.

According to PETA, Dots are vegan, and according to the Tootsie Roll Industries website, they are gluten-free, nut-free, peanut-free, and kosher (officially certified kosher by the Orthodox Union as of December 1, 2009).

== See also ==
- List of confectionery brands
