= Sugar Mama (confectionery) =

Discontinued candy in the Sugar Babies line

Sugar Mama was a confection produced by the James O. Welch Company. The confection was originally launched in 1935, and was re-released in 1965. Sugar Mama was a companion candy to the already-produced Sugar Babies and Sugar Daddy.

A Sugar Mama was a chocolate-covered caramel sucker, essentially a Sugar Daddy covered in chocolate. It had a distinctive red and yellow wrapper, the opposite of Sugar Daddy's yellow and red wrapper. Sugar Mama production was discontinued during the 1980s.
