= Tootsie Roll =

Chocolate flavored chewy candy

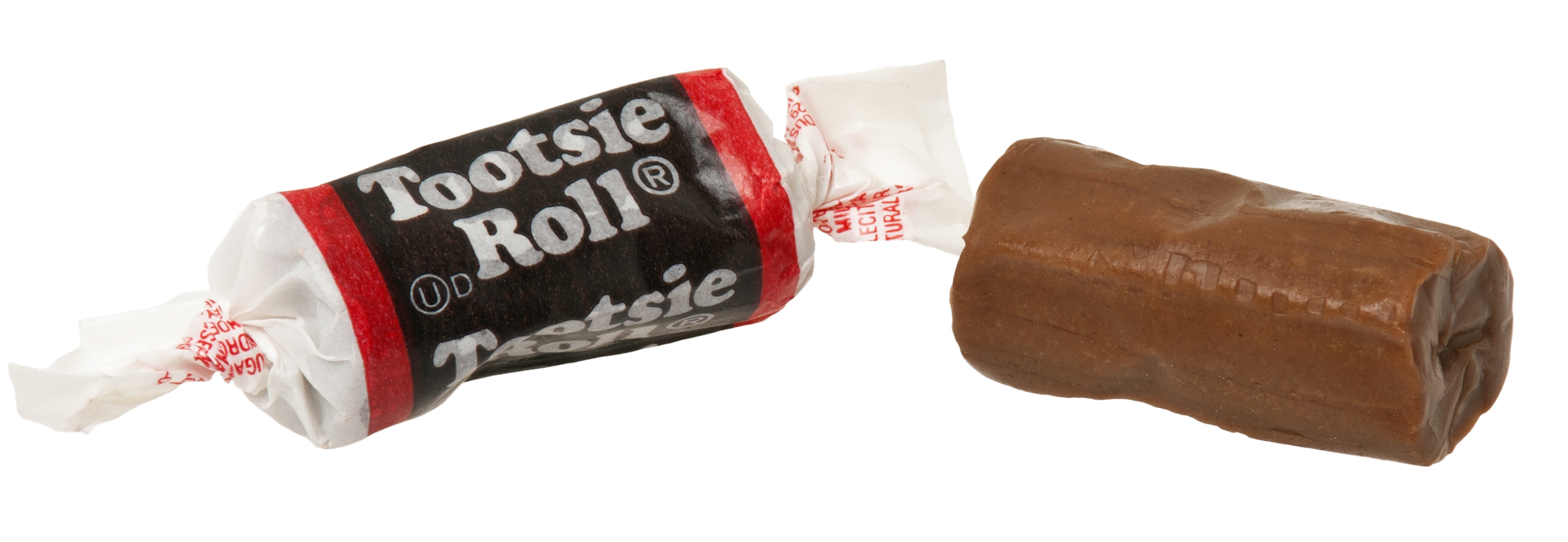
- A small Tootsie Roll "Midgees"

Nutritional value per 100 g (3.5 oz)
- Energy: 1,619.21 kJ (387.00 kcal)
- Carbohydrates: 88 g
- Sugars: 56 g
- Fat: 3 g
- Saturated: 1 g
- Trans: 0 g
- Protein: 2 g
Vitamins and minerals
Vitamins	Quantity %DV^{†}
Vitamin A equiv.	0% 0 μg
Vitamin B6	0% 0 mg
Vitamin B12	0% 0 μg
Vitamin C	0% 0 mg
Vitamin E	0% 0 mg
Minerals	Quantity %DV^{†}
Magnesium	0% 0 mg
Phosphorus	0% 0 mg
Sodium	2% 44 mg
Zinc	0% 0 mg
- Amounts converted and rounded to be relative to 6.6 g serving.
- ^{†}Percentages estimated using US recommendations for adults. Source: Nutrifox

Tootsie Roll logo

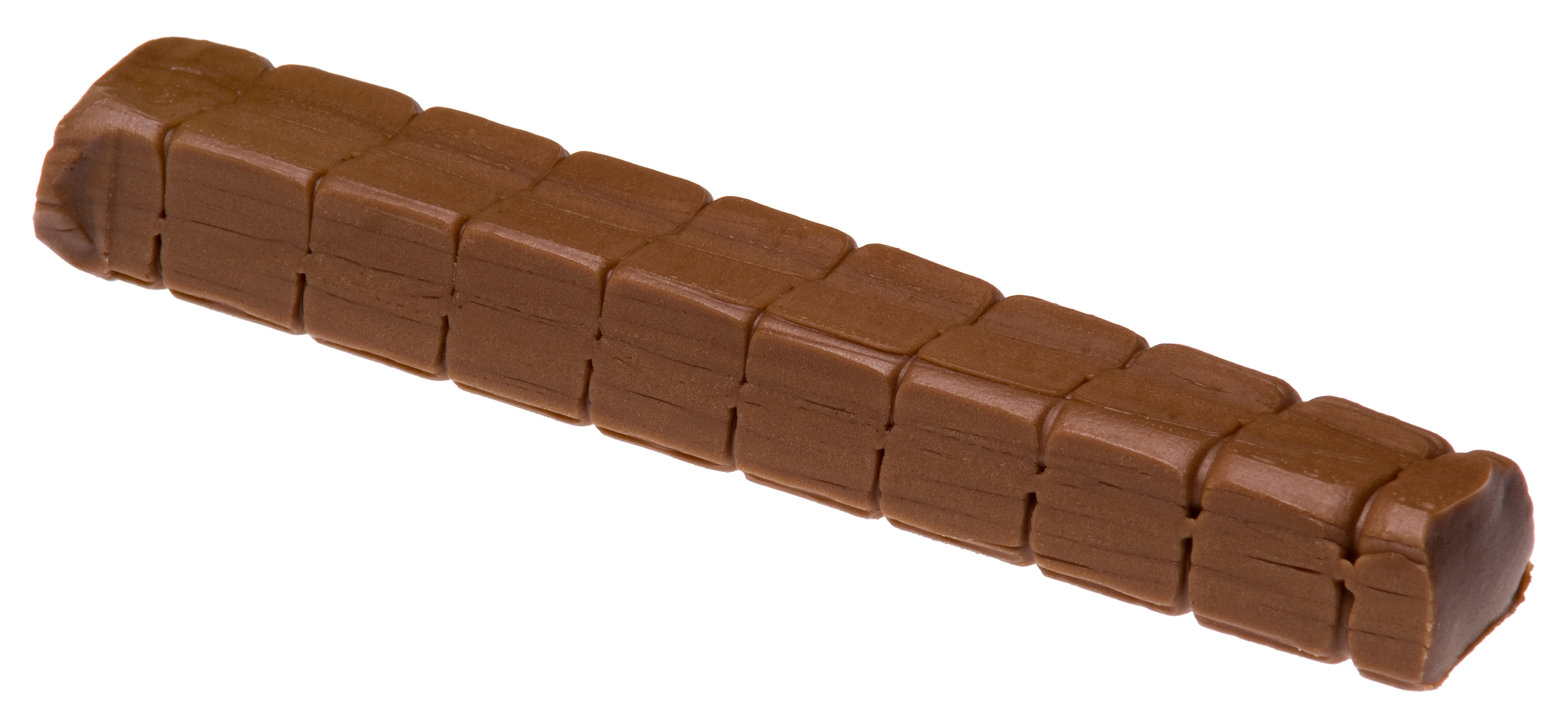
A large Tootsie Roll log

Tootsie Roll (/ˈtʊtsi/) is a chocolate taffy candy that has been manufactured in the United States since 1907. The candy has qualities similar to both caramels and taffy without being exactly either confection. The manufacturer, Tootsie Roll Industries, is based in Chicago, Illinois. It was the first penny candy to be individually wrapped in America.

Tootsie Roll Industries (name adopted in 1966) is one of the largest candy manufacturers in the world. Over 65 million Tootsie Rolls are made daily. According to the company website, the original recipe calls for the inclusion of the previous day's batch, "a graining process that Tootsie continues to this day."

== History ==
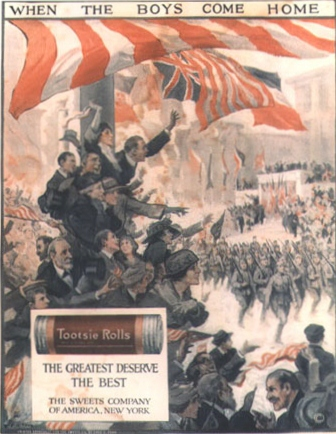
A patriotic advertisement for Tootsie Rolls during World War I

According to the official company history, founder Leo Hirschfield (spelled Hirshfield in Tootsie Industries history) was an Austrian Jewish immigrant to the United States of America, son of an Austrian candy maker. He started his own career in the candy business at a small shop or factory in New York City in 1896. He was employed in a senior position at the Stern & Saalberg company in Manhattan, New York, owned by Julius Stern and Jacob Saalberg, for many years.

Details of his early career are disputed. The more common version has him starting a candy shop in Brooklyn that later merged with Stern & Saalberg. Another version has him starting at the factory and rising to a senior management position.

The first candy that Hirschfield created was Bromangelon Jelly Powder. He completed the invention of Tootsie Rolls in 1907 after patenting a technique to give them their unique texture. He named the candy after his daughter Clara, whose nickname was "Tootsie." The first Tootsie Rolls were marketed commercially in September 1908. Hirschfeld became vice-president of the company, which changed its name to Sweets Company of America in 1917, around the time of the retirement of founders Stern and Saalberg. Hirschfield resigned or was fired in 1920 and subsequently started Mells Candy. On January 13, 1922, in his room at the Monterey Hotel in Manhattan, he shot and killed himself, leaving a note saying that he was "sorry, but could not help it."

In 1935, the company was in serious difficulty. Tootsie Roll's principal supplier of paper boxes, Joseph Rubin & Sons of Brooklyn, was concerned about losing an important customer and decided to acquire the troubled company. The company was listed on the New York Stock Exchange, but Bernard D. Rubin acquired a list of shareholders and approached them in person in order to purchase their shares. The Rubin family eventually achieved control of Tootsie Roll and agreed that Bernard Rubin would run the company as president. Under his leadership, the company steadily increased sales and restored profits by changing the formula of the Tootsie Roll and increasing its size. Additionally, Rubin moved the company from Manhattan to a much larger plant in Hoboken, New Jersey. He guided the company successfully through the difficult war years during which vital raw materials were in short supply. When he died in 1948, he had increased the sales volume twelve-fold.

After Bernard Rubin's death, his brother William B. Rubin served as president until 1962, when William's daughter Ellen Rubin Gordon took control. As of June 2025, she is chairman and CEO of the company, having succeeded her late husband, Melvin Gordon, who was chairman and CEO for many years.

== Advertisements ==
=== Captain Tootsie ===
Captain Tootsie is an advertisement comic strip created for Tootsie Rolls in 1943 by C C Beck, Pete Costanza and Bill Schreider (1950 onwards). It features the Captain Tootsie and his sidekick, a black-haired boy named Rollo, along with three other young cohorts; a red-haired boy named Fatso, a blond boy named Fisty (or a brunette named Marybelle), and a blonde-haired girl called Sweetie. The feature utilized stories in the form of full-color one-page Sunday strips, black and white daily strips, and two issues of a comic book of the same title released by Toby Press. The advertisement comic was featured by many publishers and in the newspapers. Within the context of the stories, Captain Tootsie is quite intense and quicker to the punch than any of his enemies. His stories are light and "kid-friendly." Captain Tootsie's comic strip ads ended in the 1950s.

In the 1970s, artist Herb Trimpe is believed to have modeled the original costume for the Marvel Comics character Doc Samson partly on Captain Tootsie's uniform. In 2019, artist/writer Erik Larsen used Captain Tootsie as one of several older comic book characters in the public domain as part of his Savage Dragon series.

=== Jingle ===
The Tootsie Roll jingle, "Whatever It Is I Think I See," was recorded at Blank Tape Studios, New York, in 1976. Elements of this ad can occasionally be seen today during advertised children's programming. It aired on television regularly for over 20 years, mostly during Saturday morning cartoon programming. The jingle was sung by 9-year-old Rebecca Jane Weinstein, and 13-year-old David Johnson, the children of jazz musicians and friends of the song's composer. Originally, David was to sing the solo "Whatever it is I think I see becomes a Tootsie Roll to me," but his voice was changing and cracked on the high notes, so the solo was given to Rebecca. Rebecca still has the original reel-to-reel audio tape recording.

== Ingredients ==
The current U.S. ingredients of a Tootsie Roll are sugar, corn syrup, partially hydrogenated soybean oil, condensed skim milk, cocoa, whey, soy lecithin, and artificial and natural flavors.

In 2009, Tootsie Rolls became certified kosher by the Orthodox Union.

== Alternative flavors ==
In addition to the traditional cocoa-flavored Tootsie Roll, several additional flavors have been introduced. Known as Tootsie Fruit Chews, these candies were introduced in the 1970s as Tootsie Roll Flavor Rolls and include flavors such as cherry, orange, vanilla, lemon, and lime. These varieties are wrapped in pink, orange, blue, yellow, and green wrappers, respectively. They also offer a special Mega Mix bag that includes specialty flavors, green apple, blue raspberry, and grape. The specialty Fruit Chews are wrapped in dark green, dark blue, and purple wrappers to correlate with their flavors. The "Sweet and Sour Holiday Cheer" bag contains cherry, lime, sour cherry, and sour apple. These varieties are wrapped in pink, lime green, red, and dark green wrappers, respectively.

Tootsie Frooties come in numerous different fruit flavors, including strawberry, blue raspberry, grape, green apple, banana berry, smooth cherry, fruit punch, pink lemonade, root beer, cranberry, blueberry, watermelon, and the newest, mango.

== See also ==
- Tootsie Pop
- List of confectionery brands
