= Gumdrop =

Type of candy

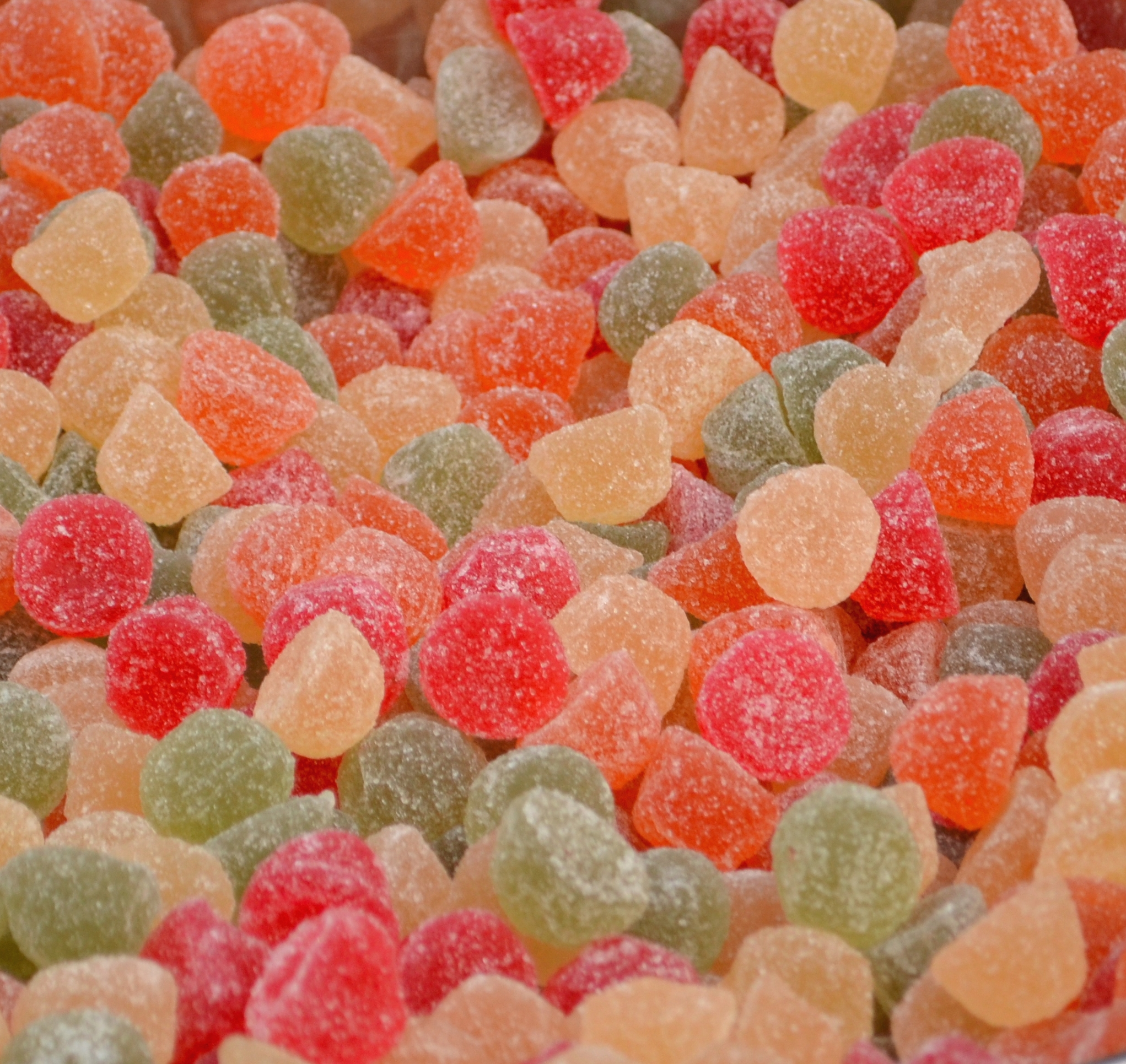
- Fruit flavored gumdrops
- Type: Confectionery
- Main ingredients: pectin, granulated sugar, flavoring
- Variations: Spice drops

Gumdrops are a type of gummy candy. They are brightly colored pectin-based pieces, shaped like a narrow dome (sometimes with a flattened top), often coated in granulated sugar and having fruit and spice flavors; the latter are also known as spice drops.

== History ==
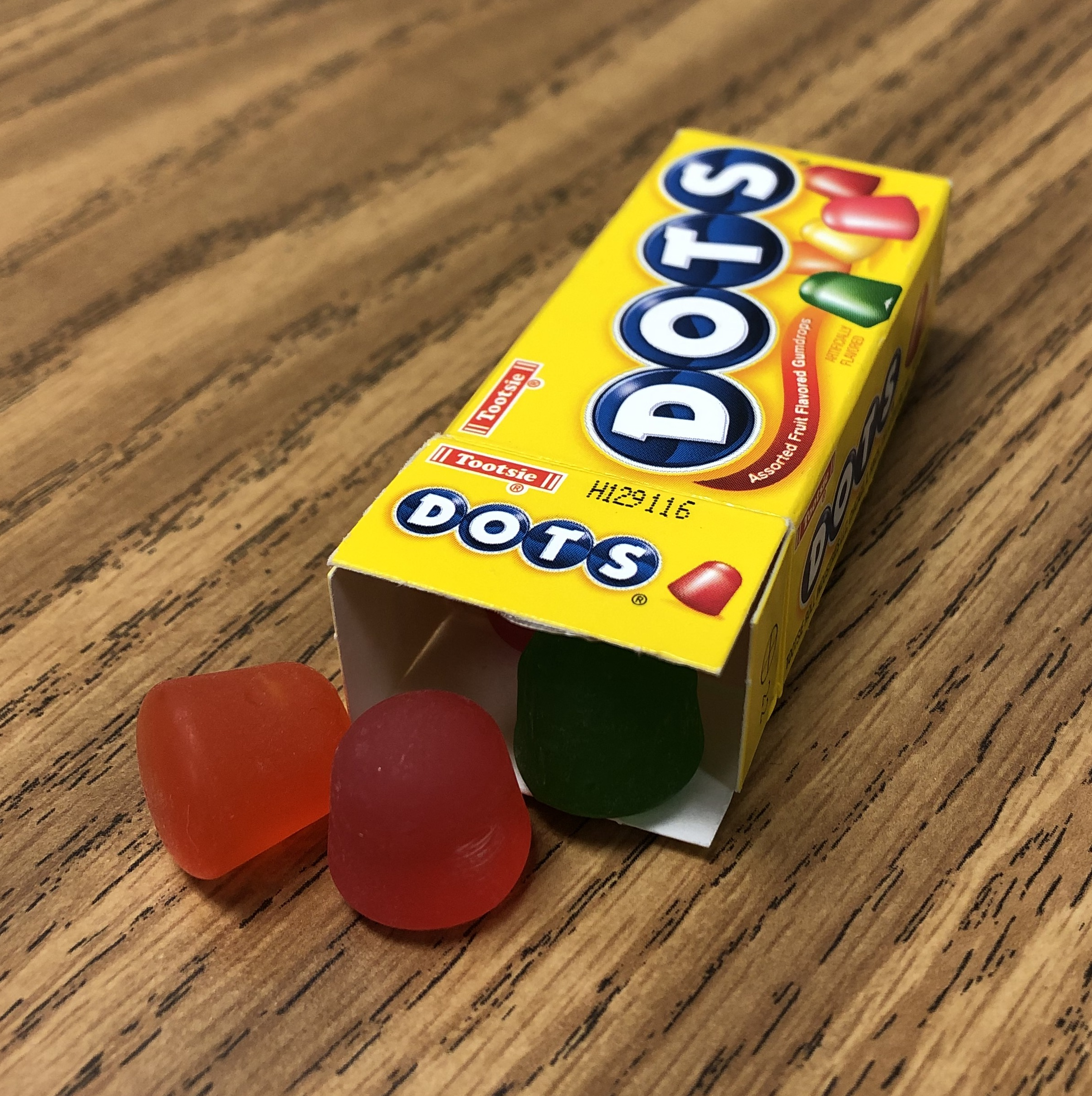
Dots, a gumdrop brand introduced in 1945 and acquired by Tootsie Roll Industries in 1972.

Gumdrops first appeared in the 19th century United States, purportedly as early as 1801, although at that time gumdrop likely referred to small, hard sweets also derived from fruit gelatin. The name "gumdrop" is not found in print until 1850, appearing in an advertisement published by The Evening Post of New York, New York for a confection shop owned by John Taylor. By that time, a gelatin-based, rubbery candy akin to modern gummies went by the gumdrop name, but also a pastier candy with a potato starch base.

One of the oldest types of gumdrops still produced are "spice" gumdrops, using traditional spices including clove, anise, allspice, spearmint, cinnamon, and wintergreen for flavoring.

== Usage ==
Gumdrops, spice drops, and their variations are used in baking for decorating cakes. Around Christmas, they are sometimes used to decorate gingerbread houses and other confections.

== In popular culture ==
The children's board game Candy Land includes a "Gumdrop Pass" and "Gumdrop Mountain" amongst its confectionery-themed nomenclature.

The use of the expression "goody gumdrops" as an alliterative exclamation of joy was first recorded in the 1959 novel Strike Out Where Not Applicable by British crime author Nicolas Freeling: "Buttered toast, and cherry cake, as well as Marmite. Goody, goody gumdrops".

The Apollo 9 Command module was nicknamed "Gumdrop" due to its shape.

In the Shrek film series, the Gingerbread Man (also known as 'Gingy', and based on the fairytale character of the same name) places great importance on his gumdrop 'buttons' (mimicking buttons on a suit). When Lord Farquaad is interrogating him, Gingy refuses to co-operate until Farquaad threatens to remove his gumdrop buttons, causing Gingy to exclaim "No! Not my gumdrop buttons!". Gingy then begins to answer Farquaad's questions.

== See also ==
- Chuckles
- Dots
- Goody Goody Gum Drops
- Gummy bear
- Jelly baby
- Jelly bean
- Jelly Drops
- Jujube
- Maynards
- Mint (candy)
- Turkish delight
- Wine gum
