= Caramel Apple Pops =

Lollipop brand made Tootsie Roll

Caramel Apple Pops logo

Caramel Apple Pops are a brand of lollipops manufactured by Tootsie Roll Industries. The lollipops combine a green apple-flavored hard candy covered with a caramel coating reminiscent of a caramel apple. There are two additional flavors available seasonally in the autumn: Golden Delicious and Red Macintosh.

Caramel Apple Pops were first sold in 1995. Since then, the product has been a popular seller. Caramel Apple Pops have also been featured in various promotional programs, including having its own Blizzard flavor at Dairy Queen in 2003.

Caramel Apple Pops do not contain gluten, peanuts, or any other kind of nut. They do, however, contain soy and milk. Each lollipop contains about sixty calories.

Caramel Apple Pops are still in production in 2026 and can be found in many American grocery stores and drugstores, and at nationwide American big box retailers including Target and Walmart or CVS. In 2021, they changed the shape of the green apple lollipop inside the Caramel to a molded circular design as compared to the previous design with jagged edges.

They can also be ordered directly from Tootsie Roll Industries.

== See also ==
- List of confectionery brands
- Tootsie Roll Industries
