= Tootsie Roll Industries =

American candy company

Tootsie Roll Industries, Inc.
- Type: Public
- Traded as: NYSE: TR; S&P 600 component
- Industry: Confectionery
- Founded: 1896; 130 years ago
- Founder: Leo Hirschfield
- Headquarters: Chicago, Illinois
- Key people: Ellen R. Gordon (President/CEO)
- Products: Candy
- Revenue: ▲US$733 million (2025)
- Operating income: ▲US$102 million (2023)
- Net income: ▲US$100 million (2025)
- Number of employees: 2,000
- Website: www.tootsie.com

Tootsie Roll Industries (/ˈtʊtsi/) is an American manufacturer of confectionery based in Chicago, Illinois. Its best-known products include the namesake Tootsie Rolls and Tootsie Pops. Tootsie Roll Industries currently markets its brands internationally in Canada, Mexico, and over 75 other countries.

== History ==
In 1896, Leo Hirschfield, an Austrian Jewish immigrant to the United States, began work at a small candy shop located in New York City owned by the Stern & Saalberg firm. In 1907, Hirschfield decided he wanted a chocolate-tasting candy that would not melt in the heat, and that would be an economical artificial alternative to traditional chocolates. He named the candy after the nickname of his daughter, Clara "Tootsie" Hirschfield. By this point, the company had expanded to a five-story factory. In 1917, the company's name was changed to The Sweets Company of America. It was reformed and listed on the American Stock Exchange in 1919.

The business forced Hirschfield out about a year later, and he started a new company, Mells Candy Corporation, also known as The Merry Mells Company. Owing to health and family issues, he died from suicide in 1922. Mells failed in 1924.

In 1931, the Tootsie Pop — a hard-candy lollipop with Tootsie Roll filling — was invented and quickly became popular with Dust Bowl refugees during the Great Depression era because of its low price. During World War II, Tootsie Rolls became a standard part of American soldiers' field rations, due to the sustainability of the candy under a variety of environmental conditions.

In 1935, the company was in serious difficulty. Its principal supplier of paper boxes, Joseph Rubin & Sons of Brooklyn — concerned about the possible loss of an important customer — became interested in acquiring control. The company was listed on the New York Stock Exchange, but Bernard D. Rubin acquired a list of shareholders and approached them in person in order to purchase their shares. The Rubins eventually achieved control and agreed that Bernard would run the company as president. Mr. Rubin was able to increase sales and restore profits steadily, changing the formula of the Tootsie Roll and increasing its size, moving from Manhattan to a much larger plant in Hoboken, New Jersey, and guiding the company successfully through the difficult war years when vital raw materials were in short supply. When he died in 1948, he had increased the sales volume twelvefold. After his death, his brother William B. Rubin became president and remained president until 1962.

In 1962, William's daughter, Ellen Rubin Gordon, took control, and since January 2015, has been Chairman and CEO of the company. For many years prior to his death, her husband, Melvin Gordon, was Chairman and CEO from 1962 to 2015.

In 1966, the company adopted its current name of "Tootsie Roll Industries, Inc.", and in 1968, moved its headquarters to Chicago.

The company has acquired several famous confectionary brands, such as The Candy Corporation of America's Mason Division (1972), Cella's Confections (1985), The Charms Company (1988), Warner-Lambert's candy division (1993; excluding gum and mints), Andes Candies (2000), and Concord Confections (2004).

Tootsie Roll Industries reported a 6.3% decline in sales for the fiscal year ending in 2024, with total revenue falling to $715.5 million. The company attributed this decrease to elevated candy prices, driven by rising costs of cocoa and chocolate, which have negatively impacted its profit margins. Tootsie Roll Industries is shifting focus toward its non-chocolate product lines in response to these challenges. As part of this strategy, its subsidiary, Charms, is investing $97.7 million to expand the manufacturing facility responsible for producing Blow Pops, a popular lollipop brand.

== Facilities ==
The company's headquarters is located on the South Side of Chicago, in a portion of the former Dodge Chicago Plant where the majority of the company's candy is produced. The company also has a factory in Mexico City where it produces some flavors of Tootsie Pops and other candy products for the Mexican market as well as for export to the U.S. and Canada. There is also a candy factory in The Port neighborhood of Cambridge, Massachusetts (belonging to the subsidiary "Cambridge Brands", formerly home to its predecessor, the James O. Welch Company), and a factory in Spain that produces candy for export to Canada.

== Brands and products ==
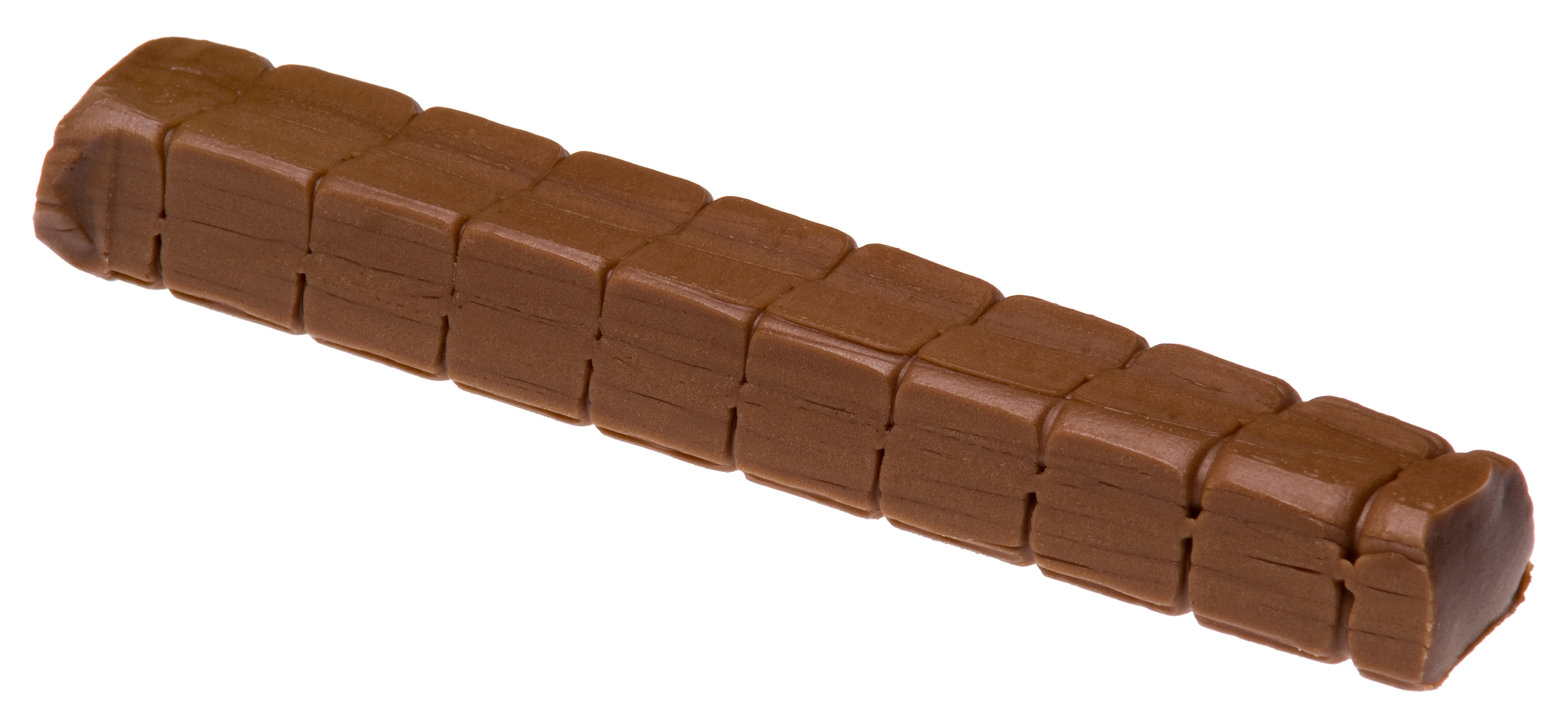
A large Tootsie Roll log

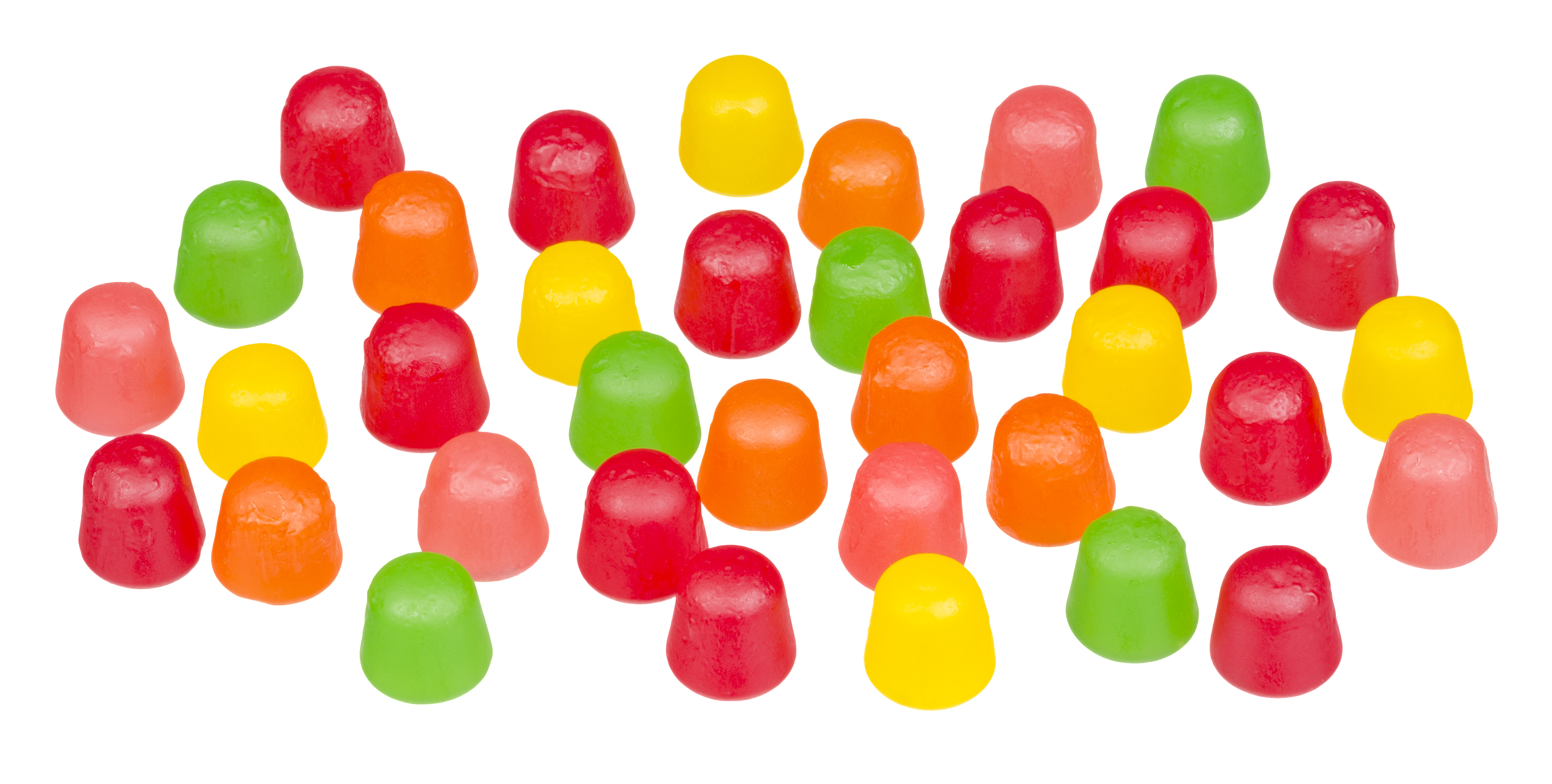
Dots gumdrops

Tootsie Roll brands and products include:

- Andes Chocolate Mints
- Candy Blox
- Cella's chocolate-covered cherries
- Charleston Chew candy bars
- Charms Blow Pops and Caramel Apple Pops
- Child's Play assorted candies
- Dots gumdrops and Crows licorice candy
- Dubble Bubble, Thrills, Razzles, and Cry Baby chewing gum
- Fluffy Stuff cotton candy
- Frooties fruit-flavored chewy candy
- Junior Caramels
- Junior Mints
- Nik-L-Nip juice confection
- Polar Mint
- Sugar Daddy and Sugar Babies
- Tootsie Rolls and Tootsie Pops
- Wack-O-Wax, wax lip candy
