= Andes chocolate mints =

Chocolate mint candy

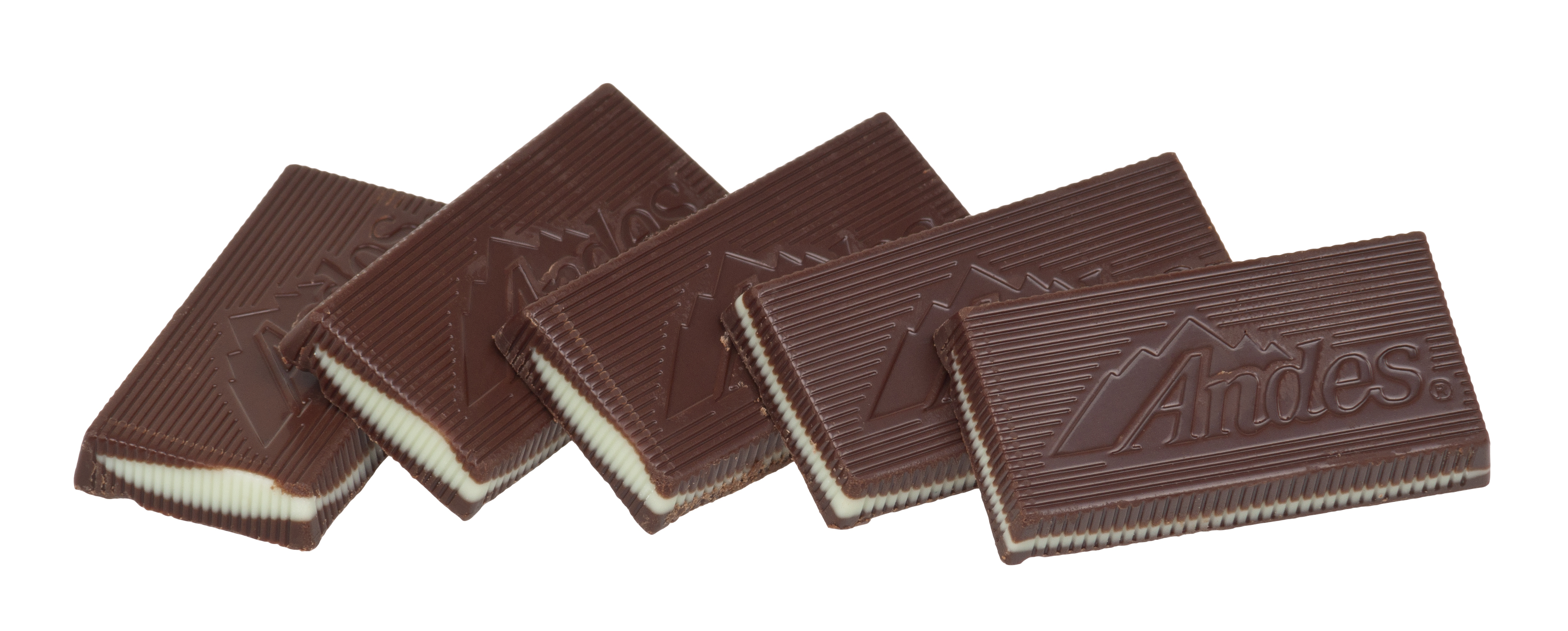
- Andes Mints
- Product type: Confectionery
- Current owner: Tootsie Roll Industries
- Country: United States
- Introduced: 1950; 76 years ago
- Markets: United States
- Website: tootsie.com/product-brand/andes/

Andes chocolate mints are small rectangular candies. The crème de menthe variety consists of one mint-green layer sandwiched in between two cocoa based chocolate flavored layers. The candies are usually wrapped in green foil and imprinted with the company's logo, the word Andes written amidst a drawing of snow-capped peaks. First launched in 1950, they are produced by Tootsie Roll Industries and made in Delavan, Wisconsin.

== History ==
In 1921, Andrew Kanelos opened a small candy store in Chicago, Illinois. While he initially called his store "Andy's Candies" in reference to himself, Kanelos realised that his predominantly male customers did not like giving boxes of candy with another man's name to their wives and girlfriends. As such, he changed the spelling of the business to "Andes Candies." The mints were first launched in 1950. In 1980, Andes was purchased by the Swiss candy company Interfood (later Jacobs Suchard). When Jacobs Suchard bought Brach's in 1987, Andes became part of that division. When Jacobs Suchard was sold to Kraft General Foods in 1990, Brach's was kept separate by owner Klaus J. Jacobs. In need of cash, Brach's sold Andes to Tootsie Roll Industries in 2000. They are made in Delavan, Wisconsin.

In the United States, Andes mints are a popular after-dinner mint and are often distributed at restaurants, particularly Olive Garden. The mint used at Olive Garden is a special flavor manufactured exclusively for the restaurant chain, but it is tastewise similar to the Mint Parfait flavor, containing the same layers, but at different ratios.

=== Construction ===
Andes are a rectangular, thin chocolate bite. The crème de menthe variety consists of three layers: two cocoa-based layers with green mint in the middle. The candies are usually wrapped in green foil and imprinted with the company's logo, the word Andes written amidst a drawing of snow-capped peaks. The most common Andes mint is 1.5 × 0.75 × 0.25 inches, weighs 4.75 grams, and contains 25 Calories.

== Other flavors ==
- Amaretto (discontinued)
- Cherry Jubilee
- Mint Parfait
- Toffee Crunch
- Peppermint Crunch (offered seasonally)
- Chocolatey Orange
- Milk Chocolatey
- Mint Cookie Crunch

In 2007, the Andes Limited Edition Dessert Indulgence array was introduced. It offered an assortment of three new flavors:

- Raspberry Cream
- Lemon Meringue
- Key Lime

== Spinoffs ==
Andes Mints have been used in several other products including baking chips, ice cream, cookies, and cake rolls. Several fast food and fast casual chains have offered Andes Mints in some of their offerings including: Jack in the Box milkshakes, Arby's milkshakes, as a Caribou Coffee cooler and as a featured topping in the topping bar at Yogurtland. Culver's offers chopped up Andes mints pieces as a custard topping. The baking chips were introduced in the autumn of 2003 and include the mints' original design. They also have multiple special edition products.

== See also ==
- List of confectionery brands
