= Charms Candy Company =

Confectionery company

The Charms Candy Company was a candy company founded in 1912 and sold to Tootsie Roll Industries in 1988. It was known for candies including Blow Pops and Charms.

== History ==
Walter W. Reid Jr. founded the Charms Candy Company in 1912. The company was originally called Tropical Charms, a reference to the individually wrapped square-shaped hard candies, which were one of the first of their kind to be individually wrapped in cellophane. Tropical Charms was founded in Bloomfield, New Jersey. The company name was eventually shortened to Charms.

During World War II, the U.S. Army began including Charms candies in combat rations as a supplemental energy form. Charms candies would continue to be included in MREs until 2007. Over the intervening years, the candies came to be associated with bad luck; in 2007, the U.S. Department of Defense removed them from all MREs due to the negative associations many service members had with the candies.

After the war, Walter Reid III, the son of the founder, took control of the company. The company was led by Reid III, Ross B. Cameron Sr. (Walter W. Reid Jr.’s son-in-law) and his two sons, Ross B. Cameron Jr. and Reid B. Cameron.

The Charms Candy Company moved its manufacturing plant from Bloomfield, NJ to Freehold, NJ in 1973. The company eventually purchased and built a manufacturing plant in Covington, Tennessee.

In 1988, the Charms Candy Company was sold to Tootsie Roll Industries. With the addition of Blow Pops to their product line, which included Tootsie Pops, the Tootsie Roll Company became the largest lollipop manufacturer in the world.

== Products ==
Charms developed a wide variety of confections.

Tropical Charms, later renamed Charms, are square candies that come in cherry, grape, lemon, lime, orange, and raspberry flavors.

From 1937 until the 1950s Charms produced pecan-filled chocolate bars called "25 Carats" made with The Hershey Company top grade chocolate (at that time, Hershey had 3 grades of chocolate). The chocolate candy was discontinued due to the high production costs and internal problems.

In the 1960s besides making other Holiday candy lollipops they also produced Charms "Jellies" and Chuckles Gum Drops. Later they created a peanut butter-filled hard candy in the shape of a peanut.

On November 28, 1966, Thomas T. Tidwell, founder of Triple T. Co. Inc., filed a patent for “Method for making candy with gum inside.” Triple T initially marketed the product as the Triple Treat. In 1973, Triple Treat sold the idea to Charms, where it was renamed Blow Pop. Blow Pops come in watermelon, strawberry, blue raspberry, cherry, grape, and sour apple flavors (sour apple was introduced later and was initially round like an apple). Blow Pops became the Charms Candy Company's best-selling product of all time.

Besides the Blow Pop, the candy company produced Charms Squares, Sweet & Sour Pops, Sour Balls and many other smaller candy products.

== See also ==
- List of confectionery brands
