= Leo Hirschfield =

Austrian-American candy maker

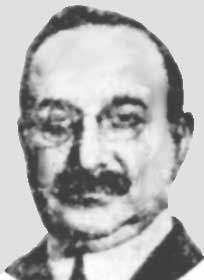
- Born: 1868; Austria
- Died: January 13, 1922 (aged 53–54); New York City, New York, U.S.
- Occupations: Confectioner, businessman
- Known for: Tootsie Roll, Bromangelon
- Website: www.tootsie.com

Leo Hirschfield (1868 – January 13, 1922) was an Austrian-American candymaker known as the inventor of the Tootsie Roll, the first individually wrapped penny candy, and Bromangelon, the first commercially successful gelatin dessert mix, which preceded Jell-O by two years.

== Early life ==
Hirschfield was an Austrian Jewish immigrant to the United States of America, the son of an Austrian candy maker.

== Career ==
In 1895, Hirschfield created Bromangelon, the first commercially successful gelatin dessert mix.

Details of his early career are disputed. The most common version has him starting a candy shop in Brooklyn that later merged with Stern & Saalberg. Another version has him starting at the factory and rising to a senior development position. According to the Tootsie Industries' official company history, he started his own career in the candy business at a small shop or factory in New York City in 1896. However, this version of events, which is repeated in sources such as the Cleveland Jewish News, is disputed by Rutgers University Professor Emerita Samira Kawash, who addressed the conflicting origins of the candy on her blog Candy Professor. Citing a 1913 Pittsburgh Press interview, Kawash states that Hirschfield worked for Stern & Staalberg before moving to Manhattan in the early 1890s. He invented the candy in 1907, and named it after his then-5-year-old daughter Clara, whose nickname was "Tootsie." That same year, he applied for a patent for Tootsie Rolls, citing its unique texture, and was awarded one in 1908. In 1909, Stern & Staalberg began marketing the candy. Based on the available evidence, Kawash concluded that the notion that the candy had been created in 1896 in Hirschfeld's Brooklyn store was a myth. In addition, Kawash points out that Tootsie was also the name of the child spokesperson for Bromangelon, leading Kawash to surmise that while the Tootsie Roll may have been "christened" in Clara's honor, she had been the namesake for something that had preceded it.

Before the adoption of modern refrigeration technology, candy sellers would spend hot summers selling candy that did not easily melt, such as taffy and marshmallows. This precluded chocolate, which melts easily. Since Tootsie had a nominally chocolate taste, it was a first for summer candies. Its patent describes that the moderately hard texture of Tootsie — in contrast to the light, porous texture of other pulled candies — was achieved by baking it at a low temperature for about two hours, giving it "a peculiar mellow consistency" that maintained its shape and did not melt. It was the first penny candy to be individually wrapped, and its low price led to its remarkable growth, making it a Depression-era favorite. During World War II, when the need for shipping food that did not spoil quickly to battlefront soldiers prompted considerable development in the field of processed food, Tootsie Rolls, which stayed fresh for a long period of time, became part of soldiers' ration packs, further solidifying Americans' love for the candy.

Hirschfield left the company in 1922, shortly before his death.

== Death ==
By early 1922, Hirschfield was wealthy, and his businesses were doing well. However, he was despondent over his long illness and his wife's mental breakdown, which left her committed in a sanitarium. On January 13, 1922, while staying at the Hotel Monterey in New York City, he killed himself, shooting himself in the head with a revolver. He left a note stating that he was "sorry, but could not help it." He was declared dead at Knickerbocker Hospital. He was survived by his daughter, who was married to an Arthur Ludwig.
