= Stride (gum) =

Brand of chewing gum

- A package of Stride Winterblue
- Product type: Chewing gum
- Current owner: Mondelez
- Country: United States
- Introduced: 2006; 20 years ago
- Discontinued: 2023; 3 years ago (North America and Europe)
- Related brands: Trident; Dentyne
- Previous owners: Cadbury Schweppes • Kraft > Mondelez
- Website: stridegum.com

Stride is a brand of sugar-free chewing gum introduced by Cadbury-Adams in June 2006 and owned by Mondelez International.

By 2020, Stride had narrowed its product line down to only the Spearmint flavor and was primarily sold online through Amazon and eBay. Its availability in retail stores had also declined since then. In 2023, Stride sales were discontinued in the United States, Canada, and Europe after the final batch of Spearmint gum was produced. Later that year, Mondelez sold its developed-market chewing gum operations to Perfetti Van Melle, but Stride was not included in the deal. The brand is currently only available for sale in China and was also previously sold in Australia for a short time.

== Products ==
=== Original ===
The original Stride launch lineup introduced the following flavors: "Forever Fruit", "Nonstop Mint", "Spearmint", "Sweet Berry", "Sweet Cinnamon", "Sweet Peppermint", "Uber Bubble", "Winterblue", "Always Mandarin", "Eternal Melon", and "Mega Mystery".

=== Stride Shift ===
Stride Shift was released in April 2010 as a flavor-changing gum sold in two variants: "Berry to Mint" and "Citrus to Mint". Its launch was carried by a digital campaign, "Change Your Flavor, Change Your Life", which allowed users to insert themselves into wacky scenarios online.

=== Stride 2.0 ===
The Stride 2.0 line was made available in February 2011 to upgrade some of the original flavors, including "Forever Fruit", "Nonstop Mint", "Spearmint", "Sweet Berry", "Sweet Cinnamon", "Sweet Peppermint", "Uber Bubble", and "Winterblue".

=== Stride Spark ===
Stride Spark was launched in February 2011 as a vitamin-fortified gum offered in three flavors: "Kinetic Mint", "Kinetic Berry", and "Kinetic Fruit". According to the product label, each piece contains 25% of the Recommended Daily Allowance for Vitamin B6 and Vitamin B12.

=== Shaun White ===
As part of a promotional collaboration with snowboarder Shaun White, Stride introduced three limited-edition flavors: "Whitemint", "Mintacular", and "Golden Fruit".

=== Stride ID ===
The Stride ID (stylized iD) line was introduced around late 2012 with marketing focused on creativity, individuality, and discovery. It launched in three flavors: "Spearmint", "Peppermint", and "BerryMelon", and featured distinctive packaging and artwork intended to appeal to a teenage audience.

=== Stride Doodle ===
Stride Doodle was a lineup released around 2013, featuring sketch-style artwork and including two flavors: "Doodle Berry" and "Doodle Mint". Marketing was supported by several commercials, notably one featuring an ostrich promoting the "Doodle Berry" flavor. The latter was described as a sweet and tangy blend of watermelon and raspberry, with "Doodle Mint" serving as its mint-flavored counterpart.

=== Stride Sour Patch Kids ===
The Stride Sour Patch Kids line was launched in January 2014 through a collaboration with the Sour Patch Kids candy brand. The gum aimed to replicate the candy's "sour-then-sweet" flavor and was initially available in Redberry and Lime, with later additions including Orange, Watermelon, and Extreme Blue Raspberry.

=== "Mad Intense" Rebrand ===
In 2016, Stride introduced a major rebranding campaign titled "Mad Intense", during which several core and brand new flavors like "Spearmint", "Peppermint", "Icymint", "Lemonberry", and "Melopeach" were launched with an updated packaging and enhanced with "Crunch Reactors" crunchy bits.

=== Other ===
In addition to its core lines, Stride released various other promotional flavors, including "Tropical Trance", "Fearless Fruit", and the contest exclusive "Mintfinity".

== International ==
Stride was available only in the United States until January 2008, when the Spearmint, Sweet Peppermint and Forever Fruit flavors were first released in Canada, with the rest of the flavors made available later on.

In Europe, some Stride flavors were being sold under the Trident Senses brand, namely the Winterblue 2.0 (sold as Mint Breeze), the Forever Fruit 2.0 (sold as Tropical Mix) and the Sweet Peppermint 2.0 (sold as Rainforest Mint and recolored to green), as well as the Mega Mystery, sold as itself. The packaging is a little more elaborate than the traditional Stride box, with the exception of the Mega Mystery which remains the same. Some other flavors have been released, but they do not relate to any Stride flavors apart from some Shift flavors.

== Design ==
Stride's "S" logo and packaging were created by Davis Design, a Canadian design and branding firm. All packs of Stride include the "S", except for Mega Mystery which replaces it with a question mark ("?"). In 2014, the "S" was redesigned and used only on Spearmint, Peppermint, Winterblue, Nonstop Mint, Stride Spark Kinectic Mint and Fruit, and Sour Patch Kids. In 2016, the brand underwent another major refresh as part of the "Mad Intense" campaign, which introduced bold, neon-colored packaging with a more energetic style. The rebrand was developed by Wieden+Kennedy London and was accompanied by a series of advertisements.

== Advertising ==
Stride chewing gum was unveiled at the All Candy Expo in 2006, when, after three years of product development, Cadbury claimed that through the use of proprietary sweetener mannitol it had produced a gum with longer-lasting flavor. Cadbury marketed the gum as "The Ridiculously Long Lasting Gum". Following competitive campaigning, New York based advertisers JWT were selected to handle the $50 million launch advertising, creating a series of work-place related ads that proved popular with consumers, according to polls by USA Today. These ads include the CEO of Stride gum begging customers to buy more gum as was popular at first but lasted too long and nobody came back for more. (October 29, 2006) In addition, Cadbury received an industry OMMA Award for online advertising creativity on September 25, 2007, for "Best Use of Gaming" in connection with its "The Ridiculously Long-Lasting Gaming Event", when on June 21, 2006. Stride teamed with Xfire to host a live "shoutcast" national videogame all-star challenge. Stride chewing gum sponsored a worldwide trip by Matt Harding in order for him to produce a popular viral video on YouTube in 2006. Starting November 5, 2009, Cadbury in connection with Kongregate sponsored "The Longest Lasting Game" contest, challenging game developers to design a game based around endurance in one month.

The growing gum market for Stride and other Cadbury-Adams brand Trident in the United States contributed to unexpectedly strong sales for the company in 2007.

Stride was heavily product placed on the television series Smallville, particularly during Season 7 - Episode 13, "Hero", which features Kryptonite - laced Stride bestowing Elastic Man powers on the character Pete Ross. The use of a decommissioned Stride factory for concerts is also central to that particular episode.

== See also ==
- Trident
- Dentyne
