= Frog on a Stick =

EP by The Crocketts
- Released: 1996
- Recorded: 1996 at Al's Recording Studio, Lampeter, Ceredigion
- Genre: Indie rock, alternative rock
- Label: Oozy Bozone

The Crocketts chronology
Frog on a Stick (1996)	Hello & Good Morning (1997)

Frog on a Stick is the debut extended play (EP) by British indie rock band The Crocketts, under the name The Crocketts 20th Century Vikings. Recorded at Al's Recording Studio in Lampeter, Ceredigion, the EP features seven tracks and was released in 1996 by Oozy Bozone Records. "Stunner" was later featured on the band's first EP with Blue Dog Records and V2 Records, Hello & Good Morning, released in 1997. Frog on a Stick was the only release by the band to feature original members Hannah Fowler and Graham Salisbury, and the only not to feature Salisbury's replacement, Owen Hopkin.

== Track listing ==
All songs credited to The Crocketts.

No.	Title	Length
1.	"Piggy Eyes"
2.	"Rasta Vege"
3.	"Banana Striped T-Shirt"
4.	"The Last Note"
5.	"Stunner"
6.	"The Stone Age Gypsy"
7.	"Billy and the Dragon"

== Personnel ==
- Davey MacManus – vocals, accordion
- Dan Harris – guitar, backing vocals
- Hannah Fowler – acoustic guitar, backing vocals
- Richard Carter – bass
- Graham Salisbury – drums, backing vocals
