= Dentyne =

Brand of chewing gum

- A package of Dentyne classic gum
- Product type: Chewing gum
- Current owner: Perfetti Van Melle (2023–pres.)
- Country: United States
- Introduced: 1899; 127 years ago
- Related brands: Trident
- Previous owners: List: Franklin V. Canning (1899–1916); American Chicle Company (1916–1962); Warner–Lambert (1962–2000); Pfizer (2000–02); Cadbury Schweppes (2002–10); Kraft (2010–12); Mondelez (2012–23)
- Website: dentyne.com

Dentyne is a brand of chewing gum and formerly breath mints owned by the Italian-Dutch company Perfetti Van Melle. It was introduced in 1899 by Franklin V. Canning as a chewing gum promoted for oral hygiene.

The brand was sold to the American Chicle Company (then "Adams Gum") in 1916. It then passed through Warner-Lambert, Pfizer, Cadbury Schweppes, Kraft Foods, and Mondelez International before being acquired by Perfetti Van Melle in 2023.

== History ==
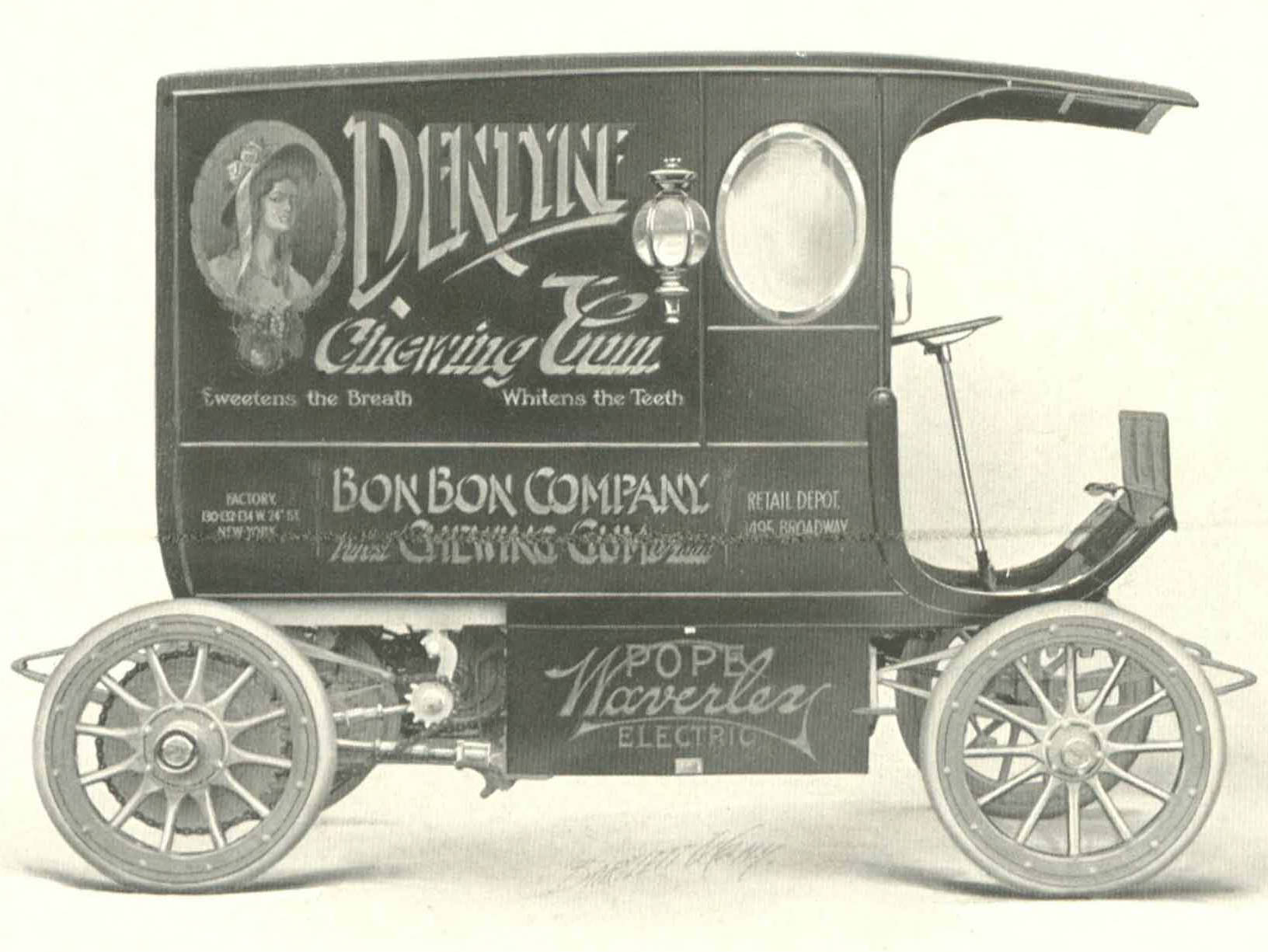
Dentyne Chewing Gum ad on a Model 63 Closed Delivery Wagon by Pope Waverley electrics in 1907

In 1899, New York City druggist Franklin V. Canning formulated Dentyne as a chewing gum which he promoted as an aid to oral hygiene. Canning's tagline was: "To prevent decay, To sweeten the breath, To keep teeth white." The name Dentyne was derived from the words "dental" and "hygiene", and also sounds similar to the word dentine. In 1916, the brand was sold to the American Chicle Company, and by the 1930s was being produced by the Adams Gum Company.

In 1962, Warner-Lambert acquired the American Chicle Company. Warner-Lambert later operated its gum and confectionery business under the Adams name. In 2000, Pfizer acquired Warner-Lambert, including its Adams confectionery business. By 2001, Dentyne accounted for 11% of Adams' sales. Pfizer later agreed to sell Adams to Cadbury Schweppes for $4.2 billion in 2002, with Dentyne among the brands included in the deal.

In 2010, Kraft Foods acquired Cadbury for $19.6 billion. In 2012, Kraft's global snacks business was separated from its grocery business and became Mondelez International, bringing Dentyne into the new company.

In 2022, Mondelez announced the sale of its developed-market gum business to Perfetti Van Melle for $1.35 billion. The brands included Dentyne, Trident, Stimorol, Hollywood, Chiclets, V6, Bubbaloo, and Bubblicious. The transaction was completed in October 2023.

== Products ==
=== Gum ===
==== Dentyne Classic ====
The original Dentyne was a cinnamon-flavored breath-freshening gum which contained sugar. Dentyne Classic was removed from American and Canadian markets in 2006 and was later relaunched before being removed from those markets again in 2019.

==== Dentyne Ice ====
Dentyne Ice is a sugar-free gum available in several mint flavors, with product offerings varying by market. In the United States, current flavors include "Arctic Chill", "Peppermint", "Spearmint", and "Winter Chill". In Canada, the current lineup includes "Peppermint", "Spearmint", "Intense", "Avalanche", "Arctic Bubble", and "Shiver", as well as an assorted pack containing multiple flavors.

==== Dentyne Fire ====
Dentyne Fire "Spicy Cinnamon", or "Cinnamon" in Canada, is a cinnamon-flavored sugar-free gum. It is the flavor most similar to the original Dentyne gum.

==== Dentyne White ====
Dentyne White is a Canadian Dentyne product designed as a sugar-free spearmint whitening gum. The packaging recommends chewing two pieces for 20 minutes at least four times a day after meals to help prevent stains.

==== Dentyne Pure ====
Dentyne Pure was a sugar-free gum line designed to freshen breath and neutralize mouth odors. It was sold in flavors including "Mint with Herbal Accents" and "Mint with Melon Accents". The line was eventually discontinued.

==== Dentyne Tango ====
In 2004, Dentyne Tango "Mixed Berry" was introduced as a fruit-flavored sugar-free gum aimed at younger consumers. The line was eventually discontinued.

==== Dentyne Blast ====
Dentyne Blast was a sugar-free gum line introduced in 2007 featuring a liquid-filled center. It was initially available in "Winter Chill" and "Cool Lime" flavors, with "Chocomint" also sold as another variety around the same period. The line was eventually discontinued.

==== Dentyne Shine ====
Dentyne Shine was a Canadian Dentyne product introduced in 2009 as a sugar-free whitening gum. It was later replaced by Dentyne White.

=== Mints ===
==== Dentyne Mints ====
Dentyne Mints were introduced by Cadbury Adams in June 2005 as sugar-free breath mints sold in 50-count packages. The original lineup consisted of Dentyne Ice Peppermint and Dentyne Fire Spicy Cinnamon.

==== Dentyne SubZero ====
Dentyne later introduced SubZero-branded mint products, including SubZero Avalanche Mints and SubZero Glacier Mints. SubZero was also used for Dentyne chewing gum products, including Glacier Mint and Iceberg Mint.

Dentyne Mints, including the later SubZero varieties, are no longer listed among the current Dentyne products in the United States and Canada, and have been discontinued.

== See also ==
- Trident
