= The Great Brain Robbery (album) =

Studio album by The Crocketts
- Released: 17 April 2000
- Recorded: Chapel Studios (South Thoresby, Lincolnshire); Monnow Valley Studio (Rockfield, Monmouthshire); Ridge Farm Studio (Rusper, West Sussex)
- Genre: Indie rock; folk punk
- Length: 44:34
- Label: Blue Dog; V2
- Producer: Charlie Francis; Bird & Bush

The Crocketts chronology
Nintendo Fallacy (1999)	The Great Brain Robbery (2000)

Singles from The Great Brain Robbery
- 1. "Host" Released: 3 April 2000; 2. "On Something" Released: 3 July 2000; 3. "1939 Returning/Chicken vs. Macho" Released: 16 October 2000

The Great Brain Robbery is the second and final studio album by British indie rock band The Crocketts. Recorded at Chapel Studios, Monnow Valley Studio and Ridge Farm Studio with producers Charlie Francis and Bird & Bush, the album was released by Blue Dog Records in conjunction with V2 Records on 17 April 2000. "Host", "On Something" and "1939 Returning/Chicken vs. Macho" were released as singles in 2000, all of which reached the top 100 on the UK Singles Chart.

== Promotion ==
The first single from the album, "Host", reached number 82 on the UK Singles Chart. The second single, "On Something", reached number 90. The third and final single, "1939 Returning/Chicken vs. Macho", reached number 94.

== Critical reception ==
Professional ratings
Review scores
Source	Rating
Kerrang!	4/5 stars
Melody Maker	2.5/5 stars
NME	3/10
Welsh Bands Weekly	Favourable

=== Positive ===
A review in the magazine Welsh Bands Weekly described The Great Brain Robbery as "fucking amazing", praising the performance of vocalist Davey MacManus as well as the "perfect harmony between voices and instruments". Songs such as "Mrs Playing Dead" and "On Something" were highlighted, with the reviewer naming "Ella Luciana" as the best song on the album. Music magazine Kerrang! praised the album as an "eclectic, moving and passionate" work, praising MacManus and guitarist Dan Boone and labelling it "an album to cherish". In its review of the single "On Something", Kerrang! highlighted the track as an example of "the undescribable, cross-genre appeal of the folky punk 'n' rollers".

=== Negative ===
Melody Maker writer Daniel Booth was less positive, however, awarding The Great Brain Robbery two and a half out of five stars and describing it as "the sound of poorly articulated angst slowly worming its way up its own arse". Booth directed particular criticism at MacManus's vocal style, and concluded by labelling the album a "crock of shit". The NME were similarly critical, awarding the album a rating of three out of ten and criticising an apparent "Midwest American" style of the material.

== Track listing ==
All songs credited to Davey MacManus/The Crocketts, except where noted.

No.	Title	Writer(s)	Length
1.	"1939 Returning"	MacManus, Dan Harris, The Crocketts	4:26
2.	"Mrs Playing Dead"		2:43
3.	"Host"		3:32
4.	"Chicken vs Macho"		2:58
5.	"On Something"	Owen Hopkin, MacManus, The Crocketts	3:00
6.	"Lucifer"		2:53
7.	"Survival of the Prettiest"		5:00
8.	"A Pity Youth Doesn't Last"		4:09
9.	"One Shake"		3:08
10.	"Million Things"		4:16
11.	"Ella Luciana"		5:17
12.	"Lady Killer"		3:12
Total length:			44:34

Japanese edition bonus tracks
No.	Title	Length
13.	"Will You Still Care"	3:40
14.	"Strong Guy"	3:47
Total length:		52:01

== Personnel ==
- Davey MacManus ("Davey Crockett") – vocals, guitar
- Dan Harris ("Dan Boone") – guitar
- Richard Carter ("Rich Wurzel") – bass
- Owen Hopkin ("Owen Cash") – drums
- Mary Hopkin – additional vocals on track 4
- Charlie Francis – production, mixing
- Bird & Bush – production on tracks 2, 4, 11 and 12
- Ewan Davis – engineering
- Dan Adams – engineering
- Graham Hogg – engineering
- Guy Davie – mastering
