= We May Be Skinny & Wirey =

Studio album by The Crocketts
- Released: 14 September 1998
- Genre: Indie rock; folk punk
- Length: 40:34
- Label: Blue Dog; V2
- Producer: David M. Allen; Davey MacManus

The Crocketts chronology
| Hello & Good Morning (1997) | We May Be Skinny & Wirey (1998) | Nintendo Fallacy (1999) |

Singles from We May Be Skinny & Wirey
- 1. "Loved Ya Once" Released: 9 March 1998; 2. "Flower Girl" Released: 11 May 1998; 3. "Explain" Released: 26 October 1998

We May Be Skinny & Wirey is the debut studio album by British indie rock band The Crocketts. Recorded with producer David M. Allen, the album was released by Blue Dog Records in conjunction with V2 Records on 14 September 1998. "Loved Ya Once", "Flower Girl" and "Explain" were released as singles in 1998, none of which charted.

== Critical reception ==
Critical reception to We May Be Skinny & Wirey was generally positive. A review of the album in music magazine NME awarded it a score of seven out of ten, with the writer proclaiming that "The Crocketts avoid earnest old-world spirituality and feckless odes to drink. They prefer to rage hard and curdle folk melodies with Davey [MacManus, singer]'s splendidly Americanised primal howl and an intriguing array of influences that ranges from the Pixies to Violent Femmes".

== Track listing ==
All songs credited to Davey MacManus/The Crocketts, except where noted.

| No. | Title | Writer(s) | Length |
|---|---|---|---|
| 1. | "Flower Girl" | | 2:51 |
| 2. | "Loved Ya Once" | Dan Harris/The Crocketts | 2:20 |
| 3. | "Explain" | | 3:31 |
| 4. | "Bluster Boy" | MacManus/Harris/The Crocketts | 3:56 |
| 5. | "Girl Next Door" | | 2:26 |
| 6. | "Tennessee" | | 2:20 |
| 7. | "Will You Still Care" | | 3:40 |
| 8. | "Closet Heroine" | | 3:21 |
| 9. | "Six Soon to Be Seven" | | 3:22 |
| 10. | "Bucket & Spade" | | 4:01 |
| 11. | "Autumn Afternoon" | | 3:40 |
| 12. | "Strong Guy" | | 3:47 |
| 13. | "Blue Dog" | | 1:19 |

== Personnel ==
- Davey MacManus ("Davey Crockett") – vocals, guitar, production on "Blue Dog"
- Dan Harris ("Dan Boone") – guitar
- Richard Carter ("Rich Wurzel") – bass
- Owen Hopkin ("Owen Cash") – drums
- David M. Allen – production on all tracks except "Blue Dog"
- Graeme Durham – mastering
- John Mossige – photography
- Keith Morris – photography
- Martin Grosvenor – photography
- Insect – art direction, design
