= Nintendo Fallacy =

EP by The Crocketts
- Released: 25 October 1999
- Genre: Indie rock, alternative rock
- Length: 17:19
- Label: Blue Dog, V2
- Producer: The Crocketts, Dave Murder, Bird & Bush, Gareth Parton

The Crocketts chronology
We May Be Skinny & Wirey (1998)	Nintendo Fallacy (1999)	The Great Brain Robbery (2000)

Nintendo Fallacy is the third extended play (EP) by British indie rock band The Crocketts. Produced by the band with Dave Murder, Bird & Bush and Gareth Parton, the EP features six previously unreleased tracks and was released on 25 October 1999 by Blue Dog Records in conjunction with V2 Records. "Mrs Playing Dead" was later featured on the band's second full-length album, The Great Brain Robbery, released in 2000.

== Promotion ==
In promotion of Nintendo Fallacy, the band toured between October and November 1999, performing in a number of major cities in England and Scotland with support acts Ruby Cruiser and Liberty 37.

== Track listing ==
All tracks are written by Davey MacManus and the Crocketts, except where noted.

No.	Title	Writer(s)	Length
1.	"Mrs Playing Dead"		2:44
2.	"Son of the Devil"		2:35
3.	"Sit Back Sucker and Say"		2:58
4.	"Smoulder"	Dan Harris/MacManus/The Crocketts	3:20
5.	"Beauty and the Beast"	Harris/MacManus/The Crocketts	2:11
6.	"Don't Curse in Front of My Kids"		3:31

== Personnel ==
The Crocketts

- Davey MacManus ("Davey Crockett") – vocals, guitar, production on tracks 3, 4, 5 and 6
- Dan Harris ("Dan Boone") – guitar, production on tracks 3, 4, 5 and 6
- Richard Carter ("Rich Wurzel") – bass, production on tracks 3, 4, 5 and 6
- Owen Hopkin ("Owen Cash") – drums, production on tracks 3, 4, 5 and 6

Guest musicians

- Robert Samuel – trumpet on track 3

Production

- Dave Murder – production and mixing on tracks 3, 5 and 6
- Bird & Bush – production on tracks 1 and 2, mixing on track 2
- Gareth Parton – production on track 4
- Charlie Francis – mixing on track 1
