= James Dean-esque =

Single by The Crocketts

from the album Super Summer Swinging Sounds
- Released: 10 May 1999
- Genre: Indie rock, alternative rock
- Length: 2:55
- Label: Blue Dog
- Songwriter(s): The Crocketts
- Producer(s): Bird & Bush

The Crocketts singles chronology
"Explain" (1998)	"James Dean-esque" (1999)	"Host" (2000)

"James Dean-esque" is a song by British indie rock band The Crocketts. Produced by Bird & Bush, "James Dean-esque" was featured on the 1999 Kerrang! compilation Super Summer Swinging Sounds and released as a single on 10 May 1999.

== Reception ==
Reviewing the single, Kerrang! awarded "James Dean-esque" a rating of five out of five, describing the song as "Classy punk 'n' roll ... a simple tale of unrequited love ... delivered with a raised middle digit and the classic line 'I ain't gonna bother with her cos she ain't gonna do it with me'". The review also praised the B-sides, highlighting the "full throttle guitars and shuffling drums" on "Billy the Bunt" and describing "Rapid Pulsing Breaths" as "gentle and acoustic-sounding like The Pogues at their most depressed".

== Track listing ==
All lyrics are written by Davey MacManus; all music is composed by The Crocketts

No.	Title	Length
1.	"James Dean-esque"	2:55
2.	"Billy the Bunt"	3:03
3.	"Rapid Pulsing Breaths"	2:20

== Personnel ==
The Crocketts

- Davey MacManus ("Davey Crockett") – vocals, guitar; production and mixing on tracks 2 and 3
- Dan Harris ("Dan Boone") – guitar; production and mixing on tracks 2 and 3
- Richard Carter ("Rich Wurzel") – bass; production and mixing on tracks 2 and 3
- Owen Hopkin ("Owen Cash") – drums; production and mixing on tracks 2 and 3

Additional personnel

- Bird & Bush – production on track 1
- Dave Murder – production on tracks 2 and 3
