= 1939 Returning/Chicken vs. Macho =

2000 song performed by The Crocketts

- CD single disc one cover

Single by The Crocketts

from the album The Great Brain Robbery
- Released: 16 October 2000
- Recorded: August 2000 at Britannia Row Studios, London
- Genre: Indie rock, alternative rock
- Length: 4:26 ("1939 Returning"); 2:58 ("Chicken vs. Macho")
- Label: Blue Dog
- Songwriter(s): The Crocketts
- Producer(s): Charlie Francis

The Crocketts singles chronology
"On Something" (2000)	"1939 Returning/Chicken vs. Macho" (2000)

Alternate cover
- CD single disc two cover

"1939 Returning" and "Chicken vs. Macho" are songs by British indie rock band The Crocketts. "1939 Returning" was produced by Charlie Francis, and "Chicken vs. Macho" (which features guest vocalist Mary Hopkin) was produced by Francis with Bird & Bush. The two tracks were featured on the band's 2000 second album The Great Brain Robbery, and released together as its third and final single on 16 October 2000.

== Composition ==
Writer and vocalist Davey MacManus has provided the following explanation of the meaning of "1939 Returning":

We open with the subject of mankind's continual digging of his own grave. We learnt nothing by our mistakes over the centuries. Unless we invent a gene or a virus which makes everyone caring and kind, we are all doomed. The quicker the better says us.

Speaking about "Chicken vs. Macho", he provided the following insight:

I hate people that are threatening. I hate knowing the truth. I want to be surrounded by white lies spoken through the fleshy lips of smiling Swedish women. Mary Hopkin sings on this song. We are very honoured to have her working with us.

== Reception ==
In his unfavourable review of The Great Brain Robbery, Melody Maker writer Daniel Booth identified "1939 Returning" as one of two "white hot-stormers" on the album.

== Track listing ==
All tracks are written by The Crocketts

CD single disc one
No.	Title	Length
1.	"1939 Returning" (August 2000 recording)
2.	"Chicken vs. Macho" (featuring Mary Hopkin)
3.	"Happy as a Bastard"

CD single disc two
No.	Title	Length
1.	"1939 Returning" (BBC live)
2.	"Chicken vs. Macho" (featuring Mary Hopkin)
3.	"That's for Sure"

7" vinyl
No.	Title	Length
1.	"1939 Returning" (August 2000 recording)
2.	"Chicken vs. Macho" (featuring Mary Hopkin)
3.	"Three in a Bed"

== Personnel ==
The Crocketts

- Davey MacManus ("Davey Crockett") – vocals, guitar; production and mixing on "Happy as a Bastard" and "That's for Sure"
- Dan Harris ("Dan Boone") – guitar; production and mixing on "Happy as a Bastard" and "That's for Sure"
- Richard Carter ("Rich Wurzel") – bass; production and mixing on "Happy as a Bastard" and "That's for Sure"
- Owen Hopkin ("Owen Cash") – drums; production and mixing on "Happy as a Bastard" and "That's for Sure"

Guest musicians

- Mary Hopkin – additional vocals on "Chicken vs. Macho"

Additional personnel

- Charlie Francis – production and mixing on "Happy as a Bastard" and "That's for Sure", production on "1939 Returning" (August 2000 recording), mixing on "Chicken vs. Macho"
- Bird & Bush – production on "Chicken vs. Macho"
- Simon Askew – production and mixing on "1939 Returning" (BBC live)
- George Thomas – production assistance and mixing assistance on "1939 Returning" (BBC live)
