= Hello & Good Morning =

EP by The Crocketts
- Released: September 1997
- Recorded: The Garden, London
- Genre: Indie rock, alternative rock
- Length: 11:18
- Label: Blue Dog, V2
- Producer: Charlie Francis

The Crocketts chronology
Frog on a Stick (1996)	Hello & Good Morning (1997)	We May Be Skinny & Wirey (1998)

Hello & Good Morning is the second extended play (EP) by British indie rock band The Crocketts. Recorded at The Garden in London with producer Charlie Francis, the EP features four tracks and was released in September 1997 by Blue Dog Records in conjunction with V2 Records. "Will You Still Care" was later featured on the band's first full-length album, We May Be Skinny & Wirey, released in 1998.

== Promotion ==
In promotion of Hello & Good Morning, the band completed a short tour in September 1997, performing five shows in Doncaster, Exeter, Cheltenham, London and Maidstone.

== Track listing ==
All songs credited to Davey MacManus/The Crocketts.

No.	Title	Length
1.	"Will You Still Care"	3:48
2.	"Stunner"	3:08
3.	"Cars and Football"	1:55
4.	"Wednesdays in My Bed"	2:17

== Personnel ==
The Crocketts

- Davey MacManus ("Davey Crockett") – vocals, guitar
- Dan Harris ("Dan Boone") – guitar
- Richard Carter ("Rich Wurzel") – bass
- Owen Hopkin ("Owen Cash") – drums

Additional personnel

- Charlie Francis – production
- Scott Howland – recording assistance
- Gareth Parton – mixing assistance
- John Mossige – photography
