= Sant Esteve Sesrovires =

- Municipality
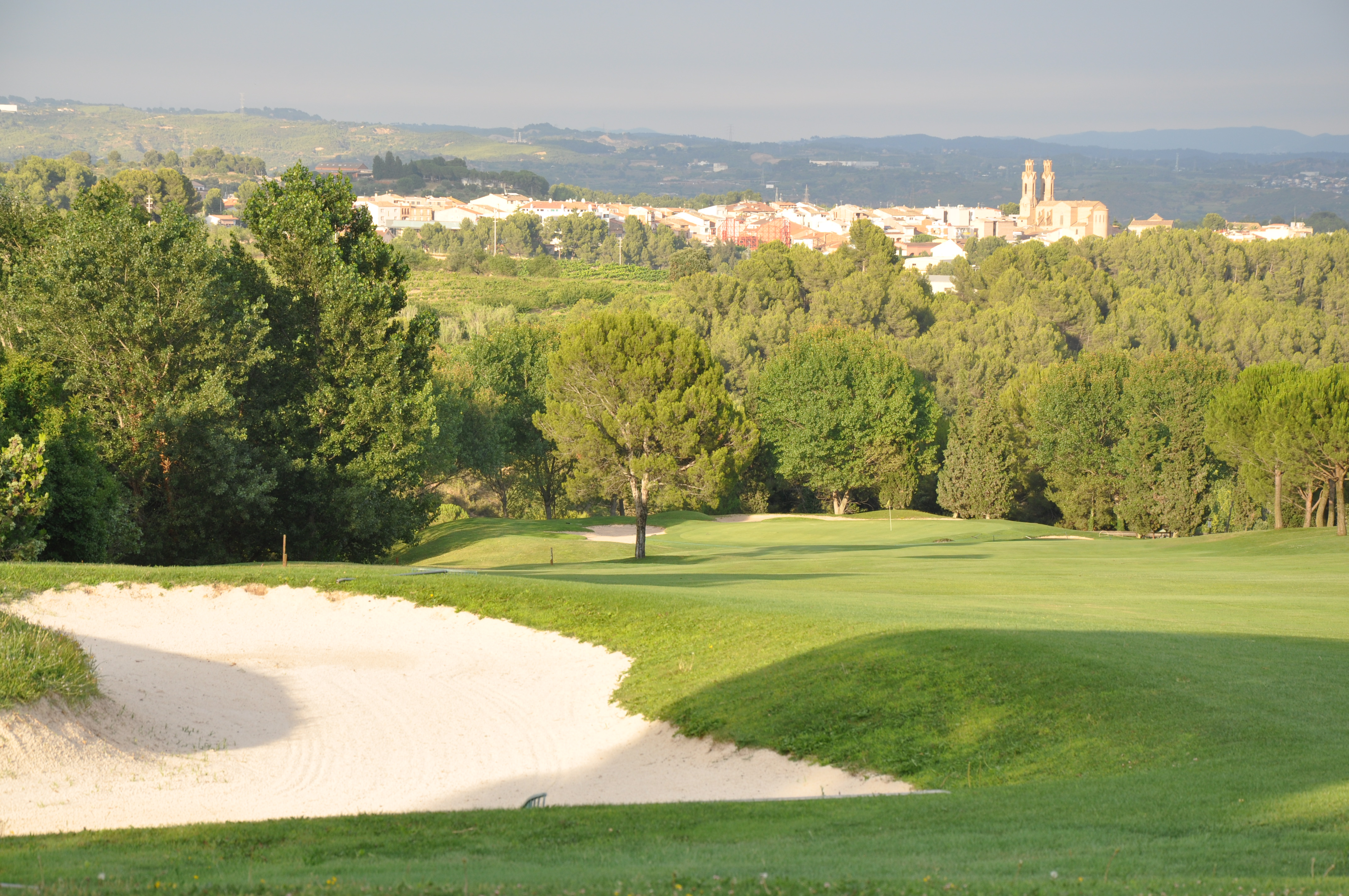
- Barcelona Golf Club, with Sant Esteve Sesrovires behind

- Location in the Province of Barcelona Location in Catalonia Location in Spain
- Coordinates: 41°29′42″N 1°52′28″E
- Country: Spain
- Community: Catalonia
- Province: Barcelona
- Comarca: Baix Llobregat

Government
  - Mayor: Enric Carbonell

Area
  - Total: 18.6 km^{2} (7.2 sq mi)
- Elevation: 183 m (600 ft)

Population (2025-01-01)
  - Total: 8,121
  - Density: 437/km^{2} (1,130/sq mi)
- Demonym: Sesrovirenc/-a
- Postal code: 08635
- Website: sesrovires.cat

Sant Esteve Sesrovires (Catalan: [ˌsant əsˈteβə səzruˈβiɾəs]; Spanish: San Esteban Sasroviras, lit. 'St. Stephen [of] the Oaks') is a municipality in the northern part of the comarca of Baix Llobregat in Catalonia, Spain. It is situated on the left bank of the Anoia river, close to the A-2 highway, and is served by the FGC railway line R6 from Barcelona and Martorell to Igualada.

== Demography ==
Sant Esteve Sesrovires had a population of 7,771 in 2021, of which 3,910 were men and 3,861 women, according to data from the Statistical Institute of Catalonia (IDESCAT).

- Population of Sant Esteve Sesrovires between 1717 and 2021

== Economy ==
The economy of Sant Esteve Sesrovires has historically benefited from its location close to the city of Barcelona. Manufacturing experienced a period of high growth in the town during the 20th century, going from a factory of wool scarves at the beginning of the century to more than 150 industries today, spread over various industrial estates. Among the companies present in Sant Esteve Sesrovires are the multinational confectionery maker Chupa Chups and the car manufacturer SEAT. The contribution of industry to the gross value added produced in the municipality is therefore significant relative to the wider economy of both Catalonia and the rest of Spain. As a result, the proportion of workers employed in the industrial sector (c. 40%) is double the average in the comarca.

Gross Value Added by sector (2019)
Sector	EUR, millions	%
Agriculture	0.3	0.1%
Industry	203.2	36.5%
Construction	13.9	2.5%
Services	338.6	60.9%
Total	556	

The GDP per capita in 2019 was approximately €79,800, which was 144.9% higher than that of Catalonia, and 202% higher than that of Spain as a whole.

== Notable people ==
- Rosalía, singer
- Enric Bernat, businessman and founder of Chupa Chups
- Pere Tarrés i Claret, medical doctor and Catholic priest
