= Enric Bernat =

Catalan scientist and businessman (1923–2003)

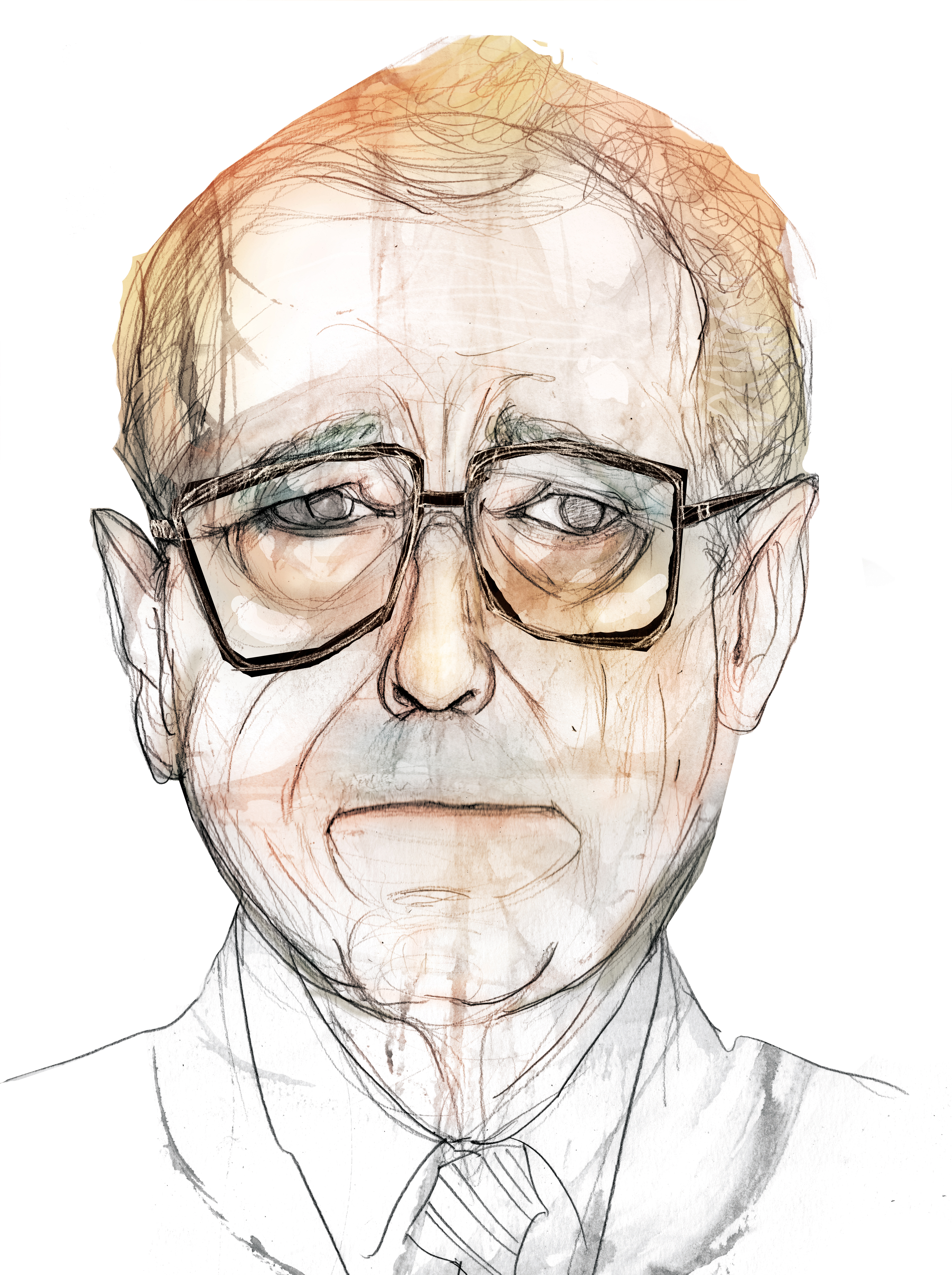
- Portrait of Enric Bernat Fontlladonosa by Eulogia Merle, displayed at Fundación Española para la Ciencia y la Tecnología
- Born: Enrique Bernat Fontlladonosa; 20 October 1923; Barcelona, Spain
- Died: 27 December 2003 (aged 80); Barcelona, Spain
- Occupation(s): Scientist, businessperson
- Employer: Chupa Chups
- Spouse: Núria Serra
- Children: 5

Enrique Bernat Fontlladonosa; 20 October 1923 – 27 December 2003) was a Spanish scientist and businessman, and the founder of the Chupa Chups lollipop company.

== Life ==
Bernat was the child of a confectioner Catalan family in the third generation and started his working life in his parents' cake shop. In the early 1950s he went to north Spain to revive an apple jam factory. As he introduced later his idea of lollipops to the investors, they left. Bernat took over the company in 1958 and renamed it Chupa Chups. In 1969 Salvador Dalí was paid a fortune to do the logo.

In the 1980s, Bernat failed a take-over of the insurance company Iberia de Seguros to fund a new Catalan investment bank. Despite the loss, he gained ownership of Gaudi's Casa Batlló. In 1991, he passed formal control of Chupa Chups to his son Xavier. The Smint subsidiary brand/company was founded in 1994.

Together with his wife Núria Serra he had three sons and two daughters, all surviving him.

Bernat died aged 80 at home in Barcelona on 27 December 2003, from an illness. A hundred people attended his funeral in Les Corts.

In 2006, Chupa Chups was sold to the Italian-Dutch company Perfetti van Melle by Bernat's sons.
