= Secrets of the Witching Hour =

Studio album by The Crimea
- Released: 30 April 2007
- Genre: Indie rock
- Length: 36:18
- Label: Double Dragon, Free Two One
- Producer: The Crimea

The Crimea chronology
| Tragedy Rocks (2005) | Secrets of the Witching Hour (2007) | Square Moon (2013) |

Secrets of the Witching Hour is the second album of the British indie band, The Crimea, released on 30 April 2007 as a free download on the band's website. The song "Loop A Loop" appeared in an advertisement for Trident Gum.

== Background and release ==
The Crimea were dropped by Warner Bros. Records in 2006 after the band's debut album, Tragedy Rocks, sold 35,000 copies worldwide. The band decided to self-finance their second album, titled Secrets of the Witching Hour, and make it available to download for free from its website. The album was released on 30 April 2007, almost two weeks before its original projected release date on 13th May 2007. Within the first 24 hours, the album was downloaded more than 5,000 times, and as of 20 February 2013 has been downloaded 118,450 times. Starting on June 4 2007, a CD version was offered for sale on a mail-order basis from the band's website.

Artwork for the cover was produced by the band's bassist Joe Udwin, in collaboration with London-based visual artist Tersha Willis.

At midnight on 13 May 2007 the band performed an acoustic gig at the summit of Primrose Hill to celebrate the release of the album. Several of the songs on the CD version of the album feature spoken introductions by Regina Spektor. The free online version contains spoken interludes by Tywanna-Jo Baskette, a singer and songwriter from Oxford, Mississippi, US.

== Critical reception ==
Professional ratings
Review scores
| Source | Rating |
|---|---|
| Hot Press | 4/5 stars |
| NME | 6/10 stars |
| Stylus Magazine | B |

In a review of the album for NME, Jess Colman wrote: "Although slightly ruined by the frequent and unnecessary Americanised monologues, the record’s Technicolor fusion of dark, sombre tunes and vibrant, upbeat tracks proudly pushes aside any doubts." Francis Jones of Hot Press said that on this album, "The Crimea manage to fashion epic tales from everyday material, intimate scenarios instilled with the heroic bombast of Greek myth, or a sense of tragedy befitting the Bard." Andrew Iliff of Stylus Magazine remarked that "the Crimea pick up the swooning where they left off" on Tragedy Rocks. Iliff added that "MacManus' indiscriminate pop culture fetishism is undiminished, littering his lyrics with movie titles and cultural landmarks."

== Track listing ==
1. "All Conquering"
2. "The 48A Waiting Steps"
3. "Raining Planets"
4. "Man"
5. "Bombay Sapphire Coma"
6. "Don't Close Your Eyes on Me"
7. "Loop a Loop"
8. "Light Brigade"
9. "Several Thousand Years of Talking Nonsense"
10. "Requiem Aeternam"
11. "Weird"
