= The Crocketts =

Welsh-Irish indie rock band from Aberystwyth

- Also known as: The Crocketts 20th Century Vikings; Georgeous Fame & the 3 Degrees
- Origin: Aberystwyth, Wales
- Genres: Indie rock; folk punk
- Years active: 1996–2002
- Labels: Blue Dog; V2
- Spinoffs: The Crimea
- Past members: Davey MacManus; Daniel Harris; Richard Carter; Owen Hopkin

The Crocketts were a Welsh-Irish indie rock band from Aberystwyth. Formed in 1996, the band featured Irish vocalist Davey MacManus, English guitarist Daniel Harris, English bassist Richard Carter and Welsh drummer Owen Hopkin. The Crocketts were signed to Blue Dog Records and released two studio albums: We May Be Skinny & Wirey in 1998 and The Great Brain Robbery in 2000. After the band split up in 2002, MacManus and Hopkin went on to form the Crimea.

== History ==
=== 1996–1999: Formation and debut album ===
The Crocketts formed in late 1996 while band members Davey MacManus, Daniel Harris, Richard Carter and Owen Hopkin were attending Aberystwyth University. An early lineup of the band known as the Crocketts 20th Century Vikings, featuring second vocalist Hannah Fowler and Graham Salisbury in place of Hopkin, released an EP in 1996 entitled Frog on a Stick. Shortly after forming the band, each member also created a nickname by which to be credited: MacManus used "Davey Crockett" (the inspiration for the band's moniker), Harris used "Dan Boone", Carter used "Rich Turpin/Wurzel" and Hopkin used "Owen Cash". After finishing university, the group signed with Blue Dog Records (a sub-label of V2 Records) and released their debut EP Hello & Good Morning in September 1997. The song "Stunner" from the EP received airplay on the animated TV series Daria, while "Will You Still Care" was named by Kerrang! as their "Song of the Week" during 1997. The rest of the year was spent touring and recording.

On 9 March 1998, the band released the first single from their upcoming debut album, "Loved Ya Once", which registered on the UK Singles Chart at number 181. This was followed on 11 May by "Flower Girl", which peaked at number 185 on the chart. The band toured England through April and May, before releasing their debut full-length album We May Be Skinny & Wirey on 14 September 1998. The album, produced by David M. Allen, was generally well received by critics; a review in music magazine NME praised the album for its "hard and curdle folk melodies with Davey [MacManus]'s splendidly Americanised primal howl and an intriguing array of influences". "Explain" was released as the final single from We May Be Skinny & Wirey on 26 October, although it failed to register on the UK Singles Chart.

=== 1999–2001: The Great Brain Robbery ===
Returning to the studio in 1999, the Crocketts released their fourth single "James Dean-esque" on 10 May 1999. Kerrang! awarded the single its maximum rating of five Ks, describing it as "classy punk 'n' roll". The track became the band's first to reach the top 100 on the UK Singles Chart, peaking at number 87. On 25 October, the group released their second EP Nintendo Fallacy, promoting it on tour throughout October and November. Between late March and early April 2000, the band completed a four-night residency at the Kashmir Klub in London, the final date of which saw the release of their next single "Host". The track reached number 82 in the UK. The residency included a number of themed nights, including activities such as "Crockaoke" and a quiz night, which Hopkin explained was done to attract people from the music industry.

The group's second album The Great Brain Robbery was released two weeks after "Host". It received praise from publications including Kerrang! and Welsh Bands Weekly, who called it "eclectic, moving and passionate" and "fucking amazing", respectively. However, it also drew criticism from Melody Maker, who dubbed it a "crock of shit", and the NME, who described it as "embarrassing". Speaking to Welsh Bands Weekly about the Melody Maker review, MacManus claimed that writer Daniel Booth was "famous for picking on a band and attacking them ... he just picked us", and that bad reviews did not affect the band as "everyone gets bad reviews". After performing on a Kerrang! sponsored tour through May and June, the Crocketts released the second single from The Great Brain Robbery, "On Something", on 3 July 2000. In their review, Kerrang! praised the song's "poetic verses" and "crashing crescendo of a chorus", claiming that it "could well be the single that gets them started [on the charts]". However, it only managed to reach number 90.

The Crocketts returned to touring in September on the Nuke Ibitha Tour and released "1939 Returning/Chicken vs. Macho" on 16 October. The double A-side reached number 94 on the UK Singles Chart. The group faced controversy at the end of the year, as frontman MacManus was at the centre of an investigation into a bottling incident at a London club on 12 December 2000 which left a man with cuts to his face, after a row said to have started due to the victim's negative remarks about the band. The band recorded and toured throughout early to mid 2001, including a support slot at a pair of Stereophonics stadium shows in July.

=== 2001–2002: Breakup and The Crimea ===
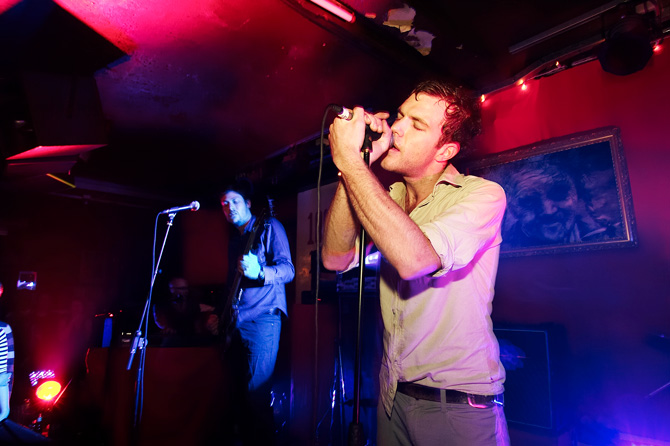
Davey MacManus (pictured) and Owen Hopkin formed The Crimea in 2002.

In late 2001, V2 Records dropped 23 of their 60 acts, including The Crocketts, leaving the band without a label. Hopkin filled in for Stereophonics drummer Stuart Cable on the band's tour of Japan in January 2002, after Cable returned home to Wales due to "family reasons", and in March the group lost Carter, who decided to leave. The remaining three members later recorded an EP under the name Klutzville, before Harris also left in May and the band officially broke up. At the time of their breakup, The Crocketts had been recording material for a planned third album, but the departure of Harris was described as a "tragic and unforeseen blow" which signalled the end of the band.

Shortly after the breakup of The Crocketts, MacManus and Hopkin returned with a new band, The Crimea, and recorded their first album quickly. In a letter sent to the press, the band proclaimed that "The beast with two backs is back ... If The Crocketts were four cavemen banging stones together, this is the sound of four Tchaikovskys banging Kylie Minogue". The group were signed to Warner Bros. Records, and released three studio albums before disbanding in 2013.

== Band members ==
- Davey "Crockett" MacManus – lead vocals, rhythm guitar
- Daniel "Dan Boone" Harris – lead guitar, backing vocals
- Richard "Rich Turpin/Wurzel" Carter – bass, backing vocals
- Owen "Cash" Hopkin – drums

== Discography ==
=== Studio albums ===
List of studio albums
Title	Album details
We May Be Skinny & Wirey	Released: 14 September 1998; Label: Blue Dog/V2; Formats: CD, LP
The Great Brain Robbery	Released: 17 April 2000; Label: Blue Dog/V2; Format: CD

=== Extended plays ===
List of extended plays
Title	EP details
Frog on a Stick (as The Crocketts 20th Century Vikings)	Released: 1996; Label: Oozy Bozone; Format: CD
Hello & Good Morning	Released: September 1997; Label: Blue Dog; Formats: CD, 10" vinyl
Nintendo Fallacy	Released: 25 October 1999; Label: Blue Dog/V2; Format: CD

=== Singles ===
List of singles, with selected chart positions, showing year released and album name
Title	Year	Chart peaks		Album
Title	Year	UK	UK Indie	Album
"Loved Ya Once"	1998	181	29	We May Be Skinny & Wirey
"Flower Girl"	1998	185	42	We May Be Skinny & Wirey
"Pedro"	1998	—	—	"Green Green Grass of Home/Pedro" (with Murry the Hump)
"Explain"	1998	—	—	We May Be Skinny & Wirey
"James Dean-esque"	1999	87	21	Super Summer Swinging Sounds
"Host"	2000	82	16	The Great Brain Robbery
"On Something"	2000	90	23	The Great Brain Robbery
"1939 Returning/Chicken vs. Macho"	2000	94	25	The Great Brain Robbery
