= On Something =

2000 single by The Crocketts

- CD single disc one cover

Single by The Crocketts

from the album The Great Brain Robbery
- Released: 3 July 2000
- Recorded: Chapel Studios, South Thoresby, Lincolnshire
- Genre: Indie rock, alternative rock
- Length: 3:00
- Label: Blue Dog
- Songwriter(s): The Crocketts
- Producer(s): Charlie Francis

The Crocketts singles chronology
"Host" (2000)	"On Something" (2000)	"1939 Returning/Chicken vs. Macho" (2000)

Alternate cover
- CD single disc two cover

"On Something" is a song by the British indie rock band The Crocketts. Credited to Davey MacManus, Owen Hopkin and The Crocketts and produced by Charlie Francis, "On Something" appeared on the band's second album The Great Brain Robbery (2000) and was released as its second single on 3 July 2000.

The music video was directed by Sam Arthur in 2000.

== Composition ==
The writer and vocalist Davey MacManus has provided the following explanation of the song's meaning:

We (like most young people) enjoy going out and getting smashed day and night whenever possible. The song is written from the perspective of looking at one of your friends, unconscious in the corner, covered in vomit, crapping himself and chewing his tongue off, but somehow still enjoying himself.

== Reception ==
Critical reception to "On Something" was generally positive. The music magazine Kerrang! awarded the single a rating of four out of five Ks, noting it as "one of the better tracks" on The Great Brain Robbery. The review provided the following description of the track:

Beginning with a twee accordion solo before bursting into poetic verses and a crashing crescendo of a chorus it typifies the undescribable, cross-genre appeal of the folky punk 'n' rollers.

The Kerrang! review also praised the single's B-sides, including the addition of the vocalist Mary Hopkin on "Host" and the "rambling prose" and "persuasive acoustic strum" of the previously unreleased song, "Opposite Ends".

A review The Great Brain Robbery in Welsh Bands Weekly identified "On Something" as a particular highlight of the album, claiming that it was "much more the style we're used to from [the band]" and comparing its sound to that of Terrorvision. Daniel Booth of Melody Maker was less positive, simply summarising "On Something" as "a gormless Pavement".

== Track listing ==
All tracks are written by The Crocketts.

Disc one
No.	Title	Length
1.	"On Something" (Wheatley mix)
2.	"Host" (featuring Mary Hopkin)
3.	"Opposite Ends" (early demo)

Disc two
No.	Title	Length
1.	"On Something" (BBC live)
2.	"Beauty and the Beast" (acoustic)
3.	"Ella Luciano" (BBC live)

== Personnel ==
The Crocketts

- Davey MacManus ("Davey Crockett") – vocals, guitar
- Dan Harris ("Dan Boone") – guitar
- Richard Carter ("Rich Wurzel") – bass guitar
- Owen Hopkin ("Owen Cash") – drums

Guest musicians

- Mary Hopkin – additional vocals on "Host"

Additional personnel

- Charlie Francis – production on "On Something" (Wheatley mix), "Host" and "Beauty and the Beast", mixing on "Host" and "Beauty and the Beast"
- Simon Askew – production and mixing on "On Something" (BBC live) and "Ella Luciano" (BBC live)
- George Thomas – production assistance and mixing assistance on "On Something" (BBC live) and "Ella Luciano" (BBC live)
- Jeremy Wheatley – mixing on "On Something" (Wheatley mix)
- Curig Huws – recording on "Opposite Ends" (early demo)
