= Host (song) =

2000 song by The Crocketts

- CD single disc one cover

Single by The Crocketts

from the album The Great Brain Robbery
- Released: 3 April 2000
- Recorded: Chapel Studios, South Thoresby, Lincolnshire
- Genre: Indie rock, alternative rock
- Length: 3:32
- Label: Blue Dog
- Songwriter(s): The Crocketts
- Producer(s): Charlie Francis

The Crocketts singles chronology
"James Dean-esque" (1999)	"Host" (2000)	"On Something" (2000)

Alternate cover
- CD single disc two cover

"Host" is a song by British indie rock band The Crocketts. Credited to Davey MacManus and The Crocketts and produced by Charlie Francis, "Host" was featured on the band's 2000 second album The Great Brain Robbery, and released as its first single on 3 April 2000.

== Composition ==
Writer and vocalist Davey MacManus has provided the following explanation of the song's meaning:

You die. Go to Heaven. God welcomes you, listens to an account of your awful life and then cannot make his mind up whether to let you stay or not. I would say I was God but I can't grow a beard properly. In the meantime I don't believe in his existence and I wrote this song because everyone seems so wrapped up in the fairytale that is the bible.

== Reception ==
In their review of The Great Brain Robbery, magazine Welsh Bands Weekly described "Host" as an "addictive" song, claiming that it "sticks around inside your head for days ... and the pretty guitar sound is just so addictive". Kerrang! awarded the single four out of five Ks in their review, describing the song as "a slightly melancholy number ... a timely reminder that life can be amazing, even when it hurts".

== Music video ==
The music video for "Host" was directed by Ralph Brown and produced by Mark Williams, both of whom also perform in the video. The video was filmed in Brighton on the request of Williams, including a number of "rich and red" theatre interiors on the West Pier. Williams describes the theme of the video as "a ghost story", and says that the inspiration came from listening to the lyrics of the song.

== Track listing ==
All tracks are written by The Crocketts.

Disc one
No.	Title	Length
1.	"Host"
2.	"You Don't Know Nothing"
3.	"Beast with Two Backs" (KFC remix)

Disc two
No.	Title	Length
1.	"Host" (live)
2.	"Will You Still Care" (live)
3.	"Strong Guy" (live)

== Personnel ==
The Crocketts

- Davey MacManus ("Davey Crockett") – vocals, guitar; production and mixing on "You Don't Know Nothing" and "Beast with Two Backs"
- Dan Harris ("Dan Boone") – guitar; production and mixing on "You Don't Know Nothing" and "Beast with Two Backs"
- Richard Carter ("Rich Wurzel") – bass; production and mixing on "You Don't Know Nothing" and "Beast with Two Backs"
- Owen Hopkin ("Owen Cash") – drums; production and mixing on "You Don't Know Nothing" and "Beast with Two Backs"

Additional personnel

- Charlie Francis – production and mixing on "Host", "Host" (live), "Will You Still Care" (live) and "Strong Guy" (live)
- Dave Murder – production and mixing on "You Don't Know Nothing" and "Beast with Two Backs"
