= The Crimea (band) =

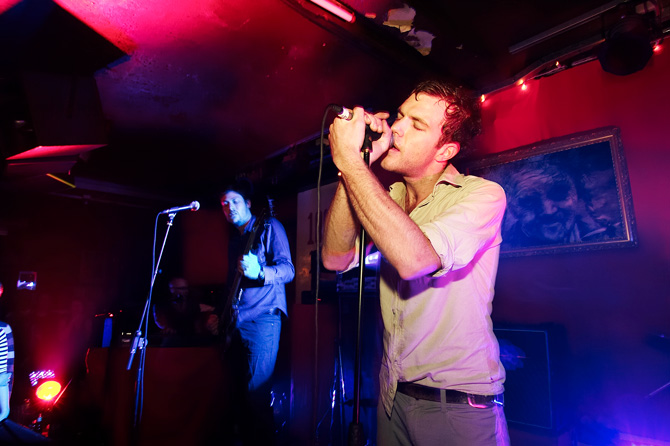
- The Crimea at The 100 Club, London, UK. January 2006.

Background information
- Origin: United Kingdom
- Genres: Indie
- Years active: 2002–2013
- Labels: Warner Records, Alcopop Records, Lazy Acre Records
- Members: Davey MacManus; Joe Udwin; Andrew Stafford; Owen Hopkin
- Past members: Andrew Norton; Julz Parker
- Website: The Crimea website

The Crimea were a British indie band, formed in 2002 and based in Camden, London. The Guardian has described the Crimea's songs as "mini-epics" that reduce frontman Davey MacManus to "spasms of jerking anguish". The Crimea released three studio albums over 11 years, finally disbanding in 2013.

== History ==
Prior to the formation of The Crimea, Davey MacManus (vocals, brother of DJ Annie Mac) and Owen Hopkin (drums) were in The Crocketts from 1996 to 2001. Following The Crocketts breakup, MacManus and Hopkin formed the Crimea in 2002 along with Joe Udwin (bass), Andrew Stafford (keys) and later Andrew Norton (guitar) and Tara Blaise (backing vocals).

The Crimea had early success with their first singles played frequently on BBC Radio 1 by John Peel in 2002, featuring on his Festive Fifty chart and recording a Peel session in January 2003. Their debut album Tragedy Rocks was self--released in 2004 and, following a showcase at the 2004 SXSW Festival, were signed to Warner Bros Records in the USA, re-releasing the album and a number of singles.

The re-released "Lottery Winners on Acid" single entered the UK Singles Chart at No. 31 and received Single of the Week on the Colin Murray and Edith Bowman show on BBC Radio 1, along with a performance on Top of the Pops.

Having left the Warner Bros label in 2006, the band continued to self-release records, including album Secrets of the Witching Hour in 2007 as a free download, receiving significant press attention for the - at the time - novel distribution method. They also saw single "Loop a Loop" used for a Trident Gum television advert.

The Crimea have toured with artists including Regina Spektor, Billy Corgan, Kings of Leon, Travis, Primal Scream, Stereophonics, Ash, Snow Patrol and Modest Mouse

The band has also previously included Julz Parker (guitar) and guest vocalists Regina Spektor, Tywanna-Jo Baskette and Annie Mac.

=== Square Moon and Breakup ===
The Crimea's third and final studio album was released on 29 July 2013 as a double album containing 22 songs, jointly by Alcopop and Lazy Acre Records. In an interview with: "God is in the TV", singer Davey MacManus spoke of his plan to go to Dieplsoot, a slum in South Africa to start a children's home. He has completed a nursing degree, and when volunteering in a clinic at a day centre for abused, sexually abused, orphaned, HIV and TB kids in 2012, he felt compelled to return and try to open a children's home, in order to protect the more at risk and sicker children he encountered.

Having previously announced their breakup on 2 July 2013, the band's final live show was performed at the Jazz Café in London on 30 July 2013, and were joined by former guitarist Julz Parker and vocalist Tara Blaise.

== Discography ==
=== Albums ===
- Tragedy Rocks (2004 - Self-release)
- Tragedy Rocks (2005 - Warner Bros)
- Secrets of the Witching Hour (2007)
- Square Moon (2013)

=== Singles ===
- "Lottery Winners on Acid" (November 2002 – UK self-released)
- "White Russian Galaxy" (June 2003 – UK self-released)
- "Baby Boom" (November 2003 – UK self-released)
- "Lottery Winners on Acid" (9 January 2006 – UK Warner) UK No. 31
- "White Russian Galaxy" (April 2006 – UK Warner) UK No. 51
- "Baby Boom" (August 2006 – UK Warner)

Note: The 2006 "Lottery Winners on Acid", "White Russian Galaxy" and "Baby Boom" singles are not re-issues, but new recordings with new b-sides.

== Members ==
- Davey MacManus – Vocals, guitar
- Joe Udwin – Bass, backing vocals
- Andrew Stafford – Keyboards, backing vocals
- Owen Hopkin – Drums
- Tara Blaise - Backing vocals

== Past members ==
- Andrew Norton – Lead Guitar 2004– 2007
- Julz Parker – Lead Guitar 2003
- Geoff - Bass Guitar 2002
