= Tragedy Rocks =

Studio album by The Crimea
- Released: 2005
- Genre: Indie rock
- Length: varies by release
- Label: Warner Bros.
- Producer: The Crimea, Davey MacManus

The Crimea chronology
Tragedy Rocks (2005)	Secrets of the Witching Hour (2007)

Tragedy Rocks is the debut album by British indie band The Crimea, released on Warner Bros. Records in 2005. A self-released version had been available to order directly from the band the previous year, featuring different recordings.

== Critical reception ==
Professional ratings
Review scores
Source	Rating
Drowned in Sound	8/10 stars
PopMatters	7/10 stars
Stylus Magazine	B

Stylus Magazine's Andrew Iliff said the album "builds on the whimsical early promise of the band, delivering a clutch of bittersweet melodies designed to bury themselves in your subconscious and niggle at your cerebellum." David Bernard of PopMatters remarked that "the songs are simple on the surface and immediately accessible, but the second and third listens reveal the emotional weight behind the excellent melodies and lyrics." Natasha Tripney of musicOMH compared the album's sound to that of The Flaming Lips, and said that the Crimea's "offbeat lyrics and general quirkiness rarely gets in the way of the music, as it sometimes can with less talented bands". Julian Ridgway of Drowned in Sound wrote: "Suitably for a band named after the site of a famous conflict, the album is a battle between opposing forces – bleakness and humour, beauty and ugliness, pure pop and musical interest. Sometimes that works, sometimes it implodes, but it never stays still."

== Track listing (self-released) ==
1. "White Russian Galaxy" – 3:17
2. "Baby Boom" – 3:36
3. "The Miserabilist Tango" - 3:30
4. "Bad Vibrations" – 3:53
5. "Lottery Winners On Acid" – 3:40
6. "Opposite Ends" – 4:17
7. "Howling at the Moon" - 2:46
8. "The Great Unknown" - 5:28
9. "Bombay Sapphire Coma"- 3:44
10. "Six Shoulders, Six Stone" - 4:25
11. "Out of Africa" - 4:21

== Track listing (UK release) ==
1. "White Russian Galaxy" – 3:43
2. "Lottery Winners On Acid" – 3:33
3. "Opposite Ends" – 4:19
4. "Baby Boom" – 3:48
5. "Girl Just Died" – 3:48
6. "Losing My Hair" – 3:19
7. "Bad Vibrations" – 3:54
8. "The Miserabilist Tango" – 3:31
9. "Gazillions Of Miniature Violins" – 3:59
10. "Someone's crying" – 4:59

== Track listing (US release) ==
1. "Piano Intro" - 0:29
2. "White Russian Galaxy" - 3:15
3. "Lottery Winners On Acid" – 3:33
4. "Baby Boom" – 3:48
5. "Losing My Hair" – 3:21
6. "The Great Unknown" - 5:39
7. "Here Comes the Suffering" - 3:06
8. "Bad Vibrations" – 3:53
9. "Opposite Ends" – 4:19
10. "Howling at the Moon" - 2:49
11. "The Miserabilist Tango" – 3:31
12. "Girl Just Died" – 3:50
13. "Gazillions Of Miniature Violins" – 4:01
14. "Someone's crying" – 4:59
