= Klene =

Liquorice confectionery

- Product type: Liquorice confectionery
- Current owner: Perfetti Van Melle
- Country: Netherlands
- Introduced: 1876
- Markets: Netherlands
- Tagline: Neerlandsch Eenige Echte
- Website: klene.nl (Dutch)

Klene is a traditional brand of liquorice confectionery, founded in 1876 by Johannes Coenradus Klene in Rotterdam, and sold primarily in the Netherlands. It is, as of 1999, owned by Perfetti Van Melle.

== Varieties ==
Klene has several different production lines including:

- Geldlijn (Money line)
- Suikervrij (Sugarfree)
- Klene Mixen (Klene Mixes)
- Snoeperig drop (Candylike liquorice)
- Mijn Persoonlijke Selectie (My personal selection)
- Wybert
