= Frisk (confectionery) =

Line of breath mint candies

- Product type: Confectionery
- Current owner: Perfetti Van Melle
- Country: Belgium
- Introduced: 1986
- Markets: Worldwide

Frisk is the name of a line of breath mint candies produced by Perfetti Van Melle. Frisk mints are small, pellet-like mint candies contained in a metal cartridge.

== History ==
Frisk was invented in 1986 by a Belgian entrepreneur who, in collaboration with a pharmaceutical company, developed the formula for a particularly strong mint-flavoured candy. Initially, the product was sold exclusively in pharmacies in Belgium, then the market was extended to the Netherlands, Canada and Japan. Especially in the latter country, Frisk gained considerable success, to the point that in 1996 it became the first imported product to obtain recognition, as the "Best Food Product of the Year" in Japan. Since 1995, the brand has been distributed by Perfetti Van Melle. There are several flavor varieties.

The classic box changed in 2004 to a box with a sliding opening, but the biggest change in visual identity came in 2009, with the introduction of the metal box and the new triangular format of the pellets. Perfetti announced in 2014 that they had removed titanium dioxide, an additive considered toxic, from all their products, including Frisk tablets. In 2016, Perfetti Van Melle announced the closure of the original Frisk factory in Haasrode, which marked the loss of 38 jobs.

In 2019, the brand signed a partnership with the audiovisual production company Myvisto to promote two of its new sugar-free products, Frisk Power Mints and Frisk Clean Breath, in advertisements for the internet. According to Perfetti Van Melle, the campaign is a success. In 2020, Frisk introduced Frisk White.

Their products are now sold in Japan, France, the Netherlands, Italy, Denmark, Canada, Belgium and Norway. Their largest market is in Japan.

Frisk is produced in Sittard, in a factory where Smint is also made.

== In popular culture ==
In the Japanese television show Downtown no Gaki no Tsukai ya Arahende!!, comedian Endō Shōzo performs a running gag during their "Absolutely Tasty" cooking segments, in which he uses Frisk candies, hoping to obtain a sponsorship with Frisk by using their product. Instead of enhancing the dishes he creates, it often leads to hilarious results.
