= Fruit-tella =

Chewy sweets

Fruit-tella is the brand name of chewy sweets manufactured by Perfetti Van Melle. They are made using fruit juice, natural colours and flavours, sugar, and gelatine.

Fruit-tella is sold in a number of varieties, including soft gummies.
