= Airheads (candy) =

Brand of confectionery

- Product type: Taffy
- Current owner: Perfetti Van Melle
- Country: United States
- Introduced: August 7, 1985; 41 years ago
- Markets: North America, United Kingdom
- Previous owners: Van Melle NV
- Tagline: "Play more. Play delicious."
- Website: www.airheads.com

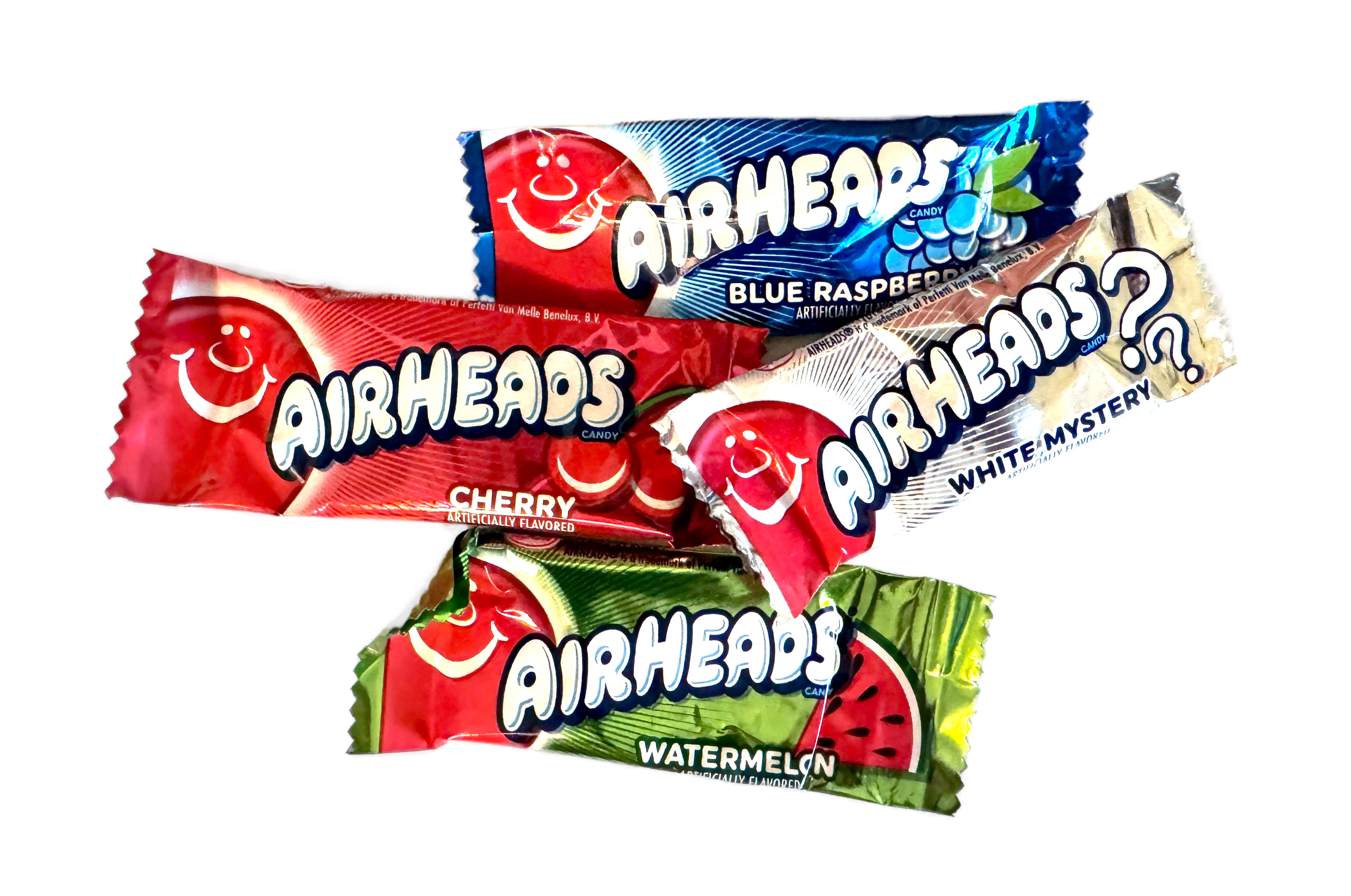
Airheads candy flavors

Airheads is an American brand of taffy candy owned by the Italian-Dutch company Perfetti Van Melle. They were created on August 7, 1985, by Steve Bruner. Airheads are available across the United States and Canada in 16 different flavors.

== Company ==
Perfetti Van Melle USA Inc. has been based in Erlanger, Kentucky, since 1979; in 1982, the company started making candy-based products. It is a 120,000-square-foot factory that currently has 200 employees.

In December 2015, an explosion occurred at the factory, causing it to catch fire. Nobody was harmed in the explosion, but production was halted temporarily.

== Flavors ==
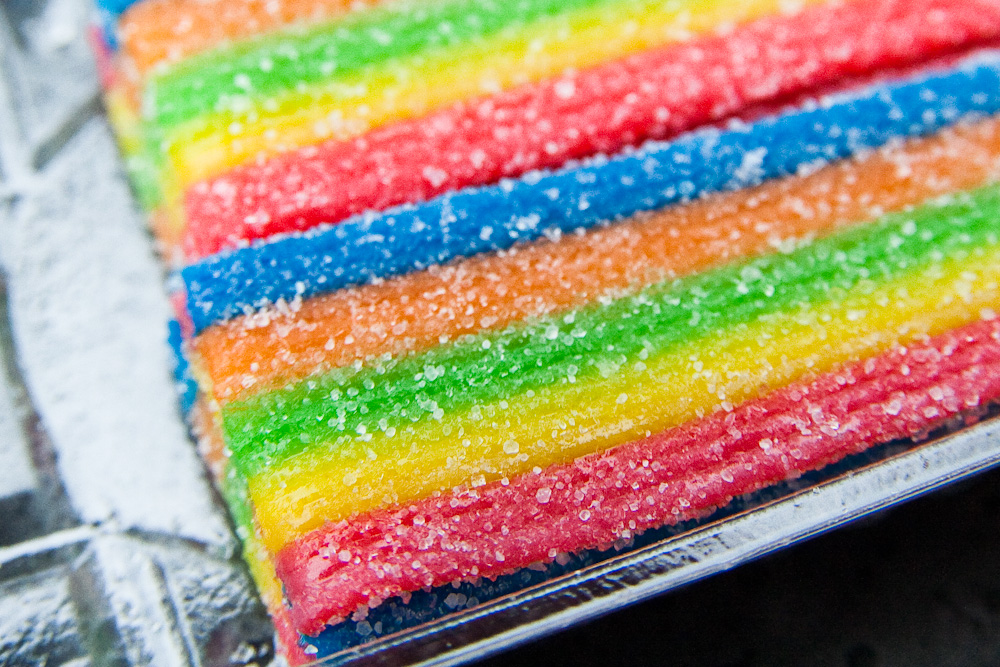
Airheads Xtreme Sweet Sour Belts Candy

The candy comes individually wrapped in long colored strips, in the flavors of:

- Cherry (red)
- Blue Raspberry (blue)
- Watermelon (green)
- White Mystery (white)
- Strawberry (dark pink)
- Orange (orange)
- Green Apple (light green)
- Grape (purple)
- Sour Blue Blast (blue)
- Sour Watermelon Punch (green)
- Sour Lemon Berry Squeeze (yellow)
- Pink Lemonade (pink)
- Tropical Cherry Explosion (red)
- Citrus Rush (yellow-green)
- Strawberry & Watermelon (pink and green striped)
- Blue Raspberry & Cherry (blue and red striped)

The above flavors are also available in mini-size. Special edition flavors, such as Superman, SpongeBob, and Spider-Man, are sold as promotions. "Airheads Xtremes", a spinoff version of the candy, are fruit rolls with a sour taste. Airheads Pops are lollipops available in the flavors of apple, blue raspberry, strawberry, cherry, watermelon, grape, strawberry kiwi and berry.

Airheads "Blue Mystery Blast" bars were distributed to travelers on JetBlue Airways on October 31, 2007, in celebration of Halloween.

In June 2013, "Airheads Bites" were released. They are tiny Airheads flavored candy items in a candy shell. The flavors included in this version of the candy are "Cherry", "Orange", "Blue Raspberry", "Watermelon", and "Mystery". In the initial release, there was a "berry variety" but the flavor has since been discontinued. In 2024, Airheads launched a cherry-scented Halloween-themed foot spray designed to fight odor and keep feet fresh.

Perfetti Van Melle partnered with Koldwave Foods LLC to create "Airheads ice cream" in August 2015. The ice-cream came in 8 different flavors: "blue raspberry", "cherry", "watermelon", "orange", "green apple", "pink lemonade", "grape", and "strawberry". Ice cream sandwiches and sundae cups were also produced with the same flavor options. In November 2019, "Airheads Paradise Blends" were released, which contained a set of four tropical flavors: "Cherry Pineapple Blast" (red), "Raspberry Lemonade" (pink), "Citrus Rush" (green), and "Blue Hawaiian" (blue), along with "White Mystery" bars.

=== White Mystery ===
White Mystery was not one of the available flavors at launch. The flavor features a silver and white wrapper with an opaque white candy and question marks where the fruit graphic usually is. One former employee, Matthew Fenton, claims the origin of White Mystery belongs to an unnamed kid via fan mail and he helped develop it further. The flavor is intentionally left unknowable to encourage guessing and chatting about the candy. A long-running rumor is that because the color is added after the flavor and the machines that make Airheads are massive, the cooks simply make the new flavor without removing all the old flavor first. This would make White Mystery a combination of two random flavors. Others claim the secret flavor is intentionally changed over the years to prevent it from being discovered or that the flavor is not consistent even within a single taffy bar.

== Nutritional facts ==
A normal 3.3 oz (94 g) pack of Airheads is 360 calories, 51 grams of sugar, and 3 grams of saturated fat. A package of "Airheads Xtremes Sweetly Sour Belts" (3 oz (85 g)) is 300 calories, 45 grams of sugar, and 0 grams of saturated fat.

A single 0.55 oz (16 g) Airheads taffy bar is 60 calories, 11 grams of sugar, and 0 grams of saturated fat.

== Production ==
Airheads are made by creating long strips, similar to the method used to manufacture Play-Doh. The main ingredient is sugar. Airheads uses taffy as one of its main ingredients, which allows it to be somewhat malleable. The candy is manufactured on a conveyor belt, where the taffy goes through sugars and sweeteners leading to a thinning, forming, and packaging process. The machines stir about 3,000 pounds of taffy.

All Airheads sold in the United States are made in Erlanger, Kentucky.

== Distribution ==
Airheads were originally sold across Canada and the United States, but an expansion into the United Kingdom was announced in 2015. "Airheads Xtremes" and "Bars" are manufactured in the US and "Airheads Pops" lollipops are manufactured and sold in Mexico and Spain.

== Advertising ==
In 2000, Perfetti Van Melle started a partnership with Mattel to use targeted advertising towards children in the USA. The advertisements ran on children's programming networks like Fox Kids and Nickelodeon to continue Airheads' already existing "Out of Control" campaign. The advertisements offered sweepstakes to Disneyland, as well as coupons on the back of Airhead packets for Mattel's "X-V Xtreme Skateboarders".

In 2003, commercials started airing on Nickelodeon. Airheads.nick.com held a poll, advertising a Green Slime flavor, a trademark of the network.

In 2023, Airheads went viral on TikTok in a trend where users vigorously shook the taffy inside the package, compressing it to a cube-like shape at the bottom. Some claimed that this method improves the flavor and is the "correct" way to eat the candy. Perfetti Van Melle responded with an #AirheadsChallenge marketing campaign, including an event in Venice Beach, California, in which bodybuilders shook Airheads bars for fans.
