= Chupa Chups =

Spanish brand of confectionery

Chupa Chups, S.A.U.
- Logo used since 1990
- Type: Subsidiary
- Industry: Confectionery
- Predecessor: Granja Asturias, S.A.U (1958–1964)
- Founded: Sant Esteve Sesrovires, Barcelona, Spain (1958; 68 years ago)
- Founder: Enric Bernat, Sethman
- Fate: Acquired by Perfetti Van Melle in 2006
- Headquarters: Barcelona, Spain
- Key people: Xavier Bernat (CEO)
- Products: Lollipops, gummy candy, drinks, ice pops.
- Revenue: €500 million (2006)
- Number of employees: 2,000 (2006)
- Parent: Perfetti Van Melle
- Website: chupachups.com

Chupa Chups (Spanish pronunciation: [ˈtʃupa ˈtʃups]) is a Spanish brand of confectionery found in over 150 countries. It was founded in 1958 by Enric Bernat and is owned by the Italian-Dutch company Perfetti Van Melle. The name comes from the Spanish verb chupar, meaning "to suck". Similar confections are known as lollipops or suckers in English.

== History ==
In the early 1950s, Enric Bernat founded the company Productos Bernat, which specialized in the production of confectionery. Bernat began working for an apple jam factory called "Granja Asturias" in 1954. By 1958, he controlled 100% of the capital of Granja Asturias and renamed the company Chupa Chups in 1961. He built the production machines and sold a striped bonbon on a wooden stick, but later it was changed to a plastic one. To ensure that competition in Spain was reduced, he purchased the Spanish patents for similar products in 1959.

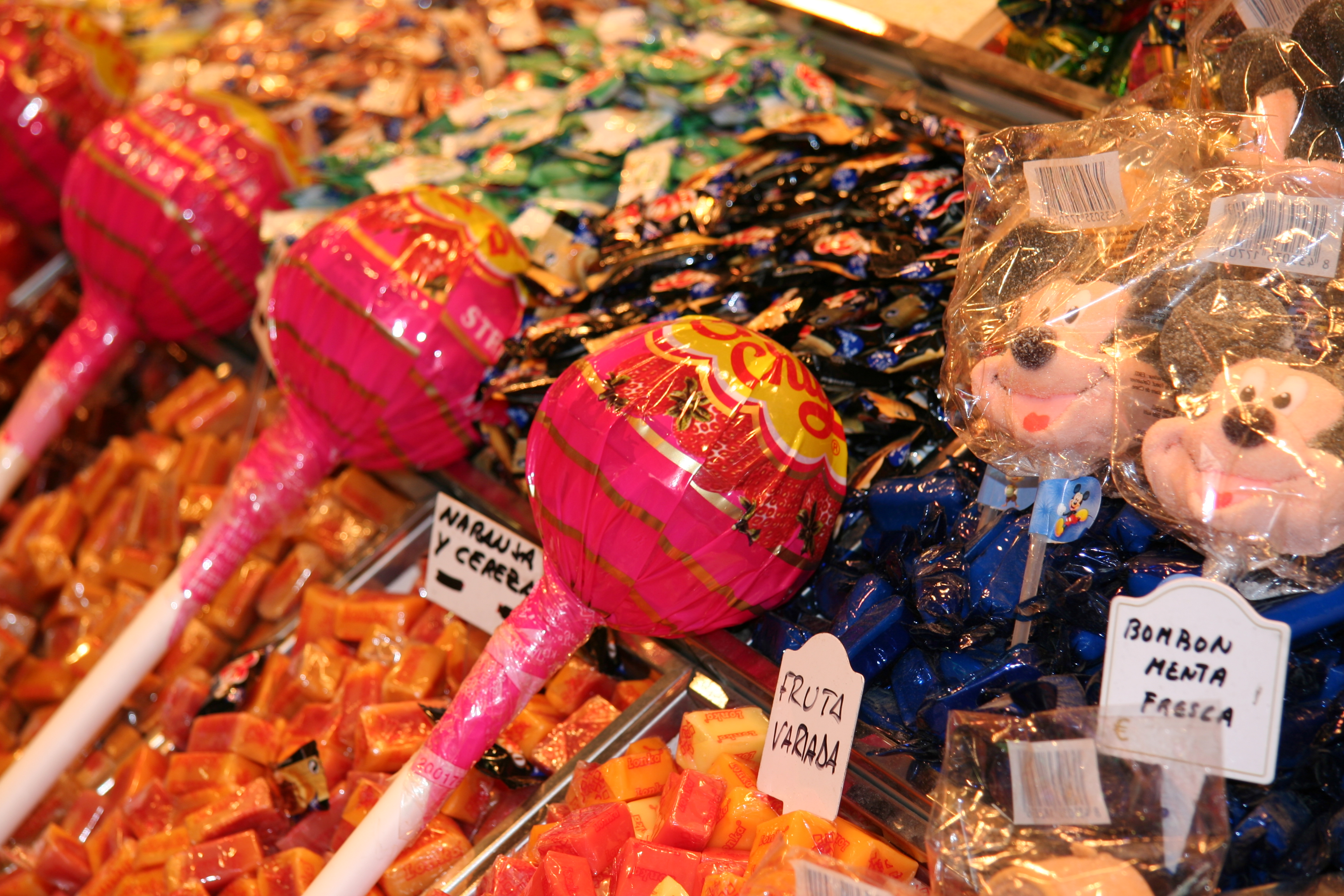
A giant Chupa Chups lollipop for sale

In 1967, the company opened the Sant Esteve Sesrovires factory in Barcelona.

In 1977, the lollipops appeared in Japan. In the 1980s, it expanded to the United States, Germany, Italy, Russia and UK. Expansion to China and Mexico happened in the 1990s.

In 1991, Bernat passed formal control of the company to his children Xavier, Ramón, Marcos, Marta and Nina. The Smint subsidiary brand/company was founded in 1994.

In July 2006, the company as a whole was acquired by the Italian-Dutch group Perfetti Van Melle.

== Marketing ==
The Chupa Chups logo was designed in 1969 by the surrealist artist Salvador Dalí. Its first marketing campaign was the logo with the slogan "Es redondo y dura mucho, Chupa Chups", which translates from Spanish as "It's round and long-lasting". Later, celebrities like Madonna were hired to advertise the product.

In the 1973 television series Kojak, actor Telly Savalas was featured consuming these lollipops.

In the 1980s, as falling birth rates reduced the number of juvenile consumers, an anti-smoking slogan "Smoke Chupa Chups" was tried to attract adult consumers. The company's current anti-smoking slogan is "Stop smoking, start sucking", with their packages parodying cigarette pack designs. Some packages parody the mandatory black and white warning labels of the European Union with the notice "Sucking does not kill."

In the 1990s, Chupa Chups began supplying FC Barcelona manager Johan Cruyff with lollipops. Cruyff would suck Chupa Chups on the touchline during matches, having been forced to give up smoking for health reasons. When Cruyff died in 2016, fans left lollipops at his memorial.

Chupa Chups sponsored the 1992 video game Zool. Their logo was featured prominently in the first level, "Sweet World".

In 1995, Chupa Chups became the first candy sent to the Mir space station.

In 1997, Chupa Chups launched a Spice Girls lollipop range with different packages each featuring a collectible Spice Girl sticker, toy microphones, and bubblegum packets that came with collectible Spice Girls temporary tattoos, as well as "Push Pops" and "Crazy Dips".

Between 2000 and 2003, Chupa Chups was the main shirt sponsor of English football team Sheffield Wednesday.

Since 2007, Chupa Chups was the signature sweet of the Marriott brand hotel Springhill Suites. Chupa Chups were available at the front desk of any Springhill Suites property for free to any guest, child or adult. As of August 2021, Marriott has begun stepping away from Chupa Chups as a signature item for Springhill Suites.

Messer Chups is a surf rock band from Saint Petersburg, Russia. In the group's name, "Messer" is taken from the German word for "knife" and "Chups" from Chupa Chups lollipops.

In 2025, Chupa Chups launched an Australian advertising campaign with the slogan "Suck Yeah"; this is the company's first major campaign in the country in more than a decade.

== Products ==
Chupa Chups has a large product range, with their flagship lollipop being the most popular.

- Lollipops
  - Classic, 12 gram
    - Cremosa (ice cream and yogurt flavors)
  - Mini, 6 gram
  - Filled Lollipops
    - Magics (powder filled)
    - Bubble Gum (with bubble gum center)
    - Fruit-tella (flavors from nature)
    - Chocolate (filled with chocolate)
    - Cuore di Frutta
  - 2Pop
  - Sugar Free
  - XXL
  - Crazy Dips (explosion)
  - Melody Whistle Pops
- Bubble Gums
  - Big Babol
  - Cotton Bubblegum
- Toys
  - Spinning Faces
  - Totem Markers
  - Funky Labyrinths
  - Balloon Cars
- Gifts and Seasonal Gifts
  - Mega Chups 750 gr
  - Back Packs
- Chupa + Surprise
- License Products
- Sparkling Drinks

Chupa Chups has more than 100 flavours available worldwide, including sugar-free varieties. They are individually heat-sealed in the factory, and are best opened by twisting the base of the wrapper.
