= Pere Tarrés i Claret =

Blessed Pere Tarrès i Claret
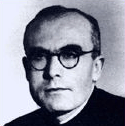

Priest
- Born: 30 May 1905; Manresa, Barcelona, Kingdom of Spain
- Died: 31 August 1950 (aged 45); Barcelona, Francoist Spain
- Venerated in: Roman Catholic Church
- Beatified: 5 September 2004, Loreto, Italy by Pope John Paul II
- Feast: 31 August
- Attributes: Priest's cassock

Pere Tarrés i Claret (30 May 1905 – 31 August 1950) was a Catholic doctor from Barcelona, who became a priest. Claret served as a doctor during the Spanish Civil War, and administered to the poor and to those who suffered from tuberculosis; he also co-established a clinic for those who could not afford adequate medical treatment.

He was beatified by Pope John Paul II in Loreto on 5 September 2004.

== Life ==
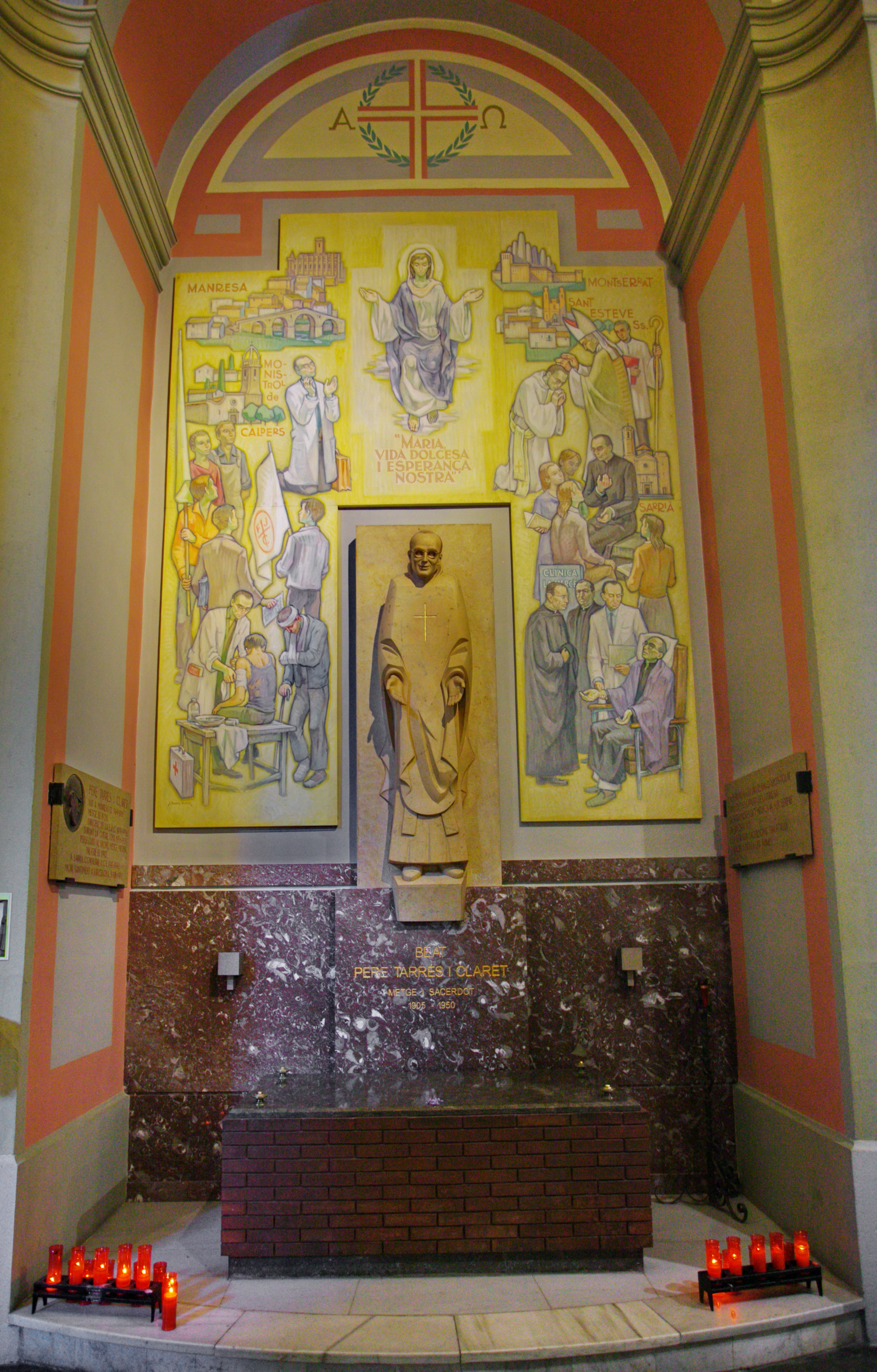
Tomb.

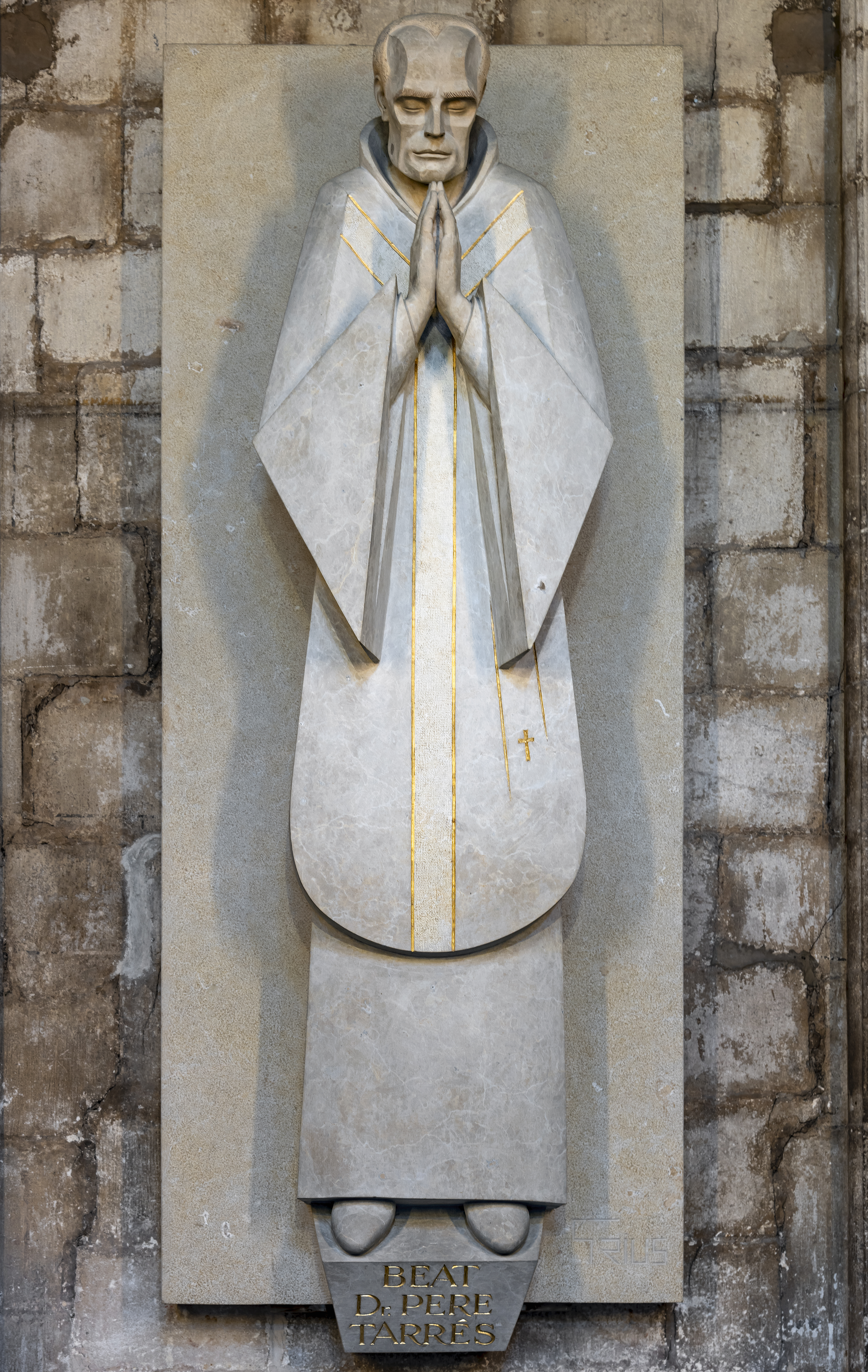
Monument in Barcelona Cathedral

Pere Tarrés i Claret was born in 1905 in Manresa to Francesc Tarrés Puigdellívol and Carme Claret Masats; his two sisters Francesca and Maria later became nuns. As a child he helped the local chemist and store owner Josep Balaguer who encouraged the child to continue his studies in medicine. From the age of nine he studied with the Jesuits; he received Confirmation on 31 May 1910 and his First Communion on 1 May 1913.

He moved to Barcelona in October 1921 in order to prepare for his studies in medicine; it was there that he decided to become a medical practitioner with the sole aim of helping other people. On 12 March 1925 he gave his first lecture on medicine at the Moral and Instructive Centre de Gracia. His father died in July 1925 and his mother suffered a severe accident not long after that gave her a physical disability. On the occasion of Christmas 1927 he made a vow of chastity. During his period of studies he received spiritual direction from Jaume Serra who encouraged Claret to enter a particular Christian federation. In the 1930s he began to attend meetings of the Federation of Young Christians of Catalonia – upon Serra's advice – and soon became one of its most prominent of leaders. He later was made its president and was known for his openness to others' ideas and for his stark enthusiasm. He maintained frequent correspondence with several colleagues in the federation and later ascended to the post of vice-president of the federal council. In 1935 he was made an official of the new diocesan committee and was later made an official in the archdiocesan committee – he received the recommendation of the Cardinal Archbishop of Tarragona Francisco Vidal y Barraquer. Claret was also involved in work with the Catholic Action movement. In 1936 he graduated with a degree in medicine.

During the Spanish Civil War he lived as a "refugee" since anti-religious sentiment spread across the state. Tarrés administered the sacraments to those whom he could reach in secret. At the beginning of the war, he intervened in the preservation of the monastery of Montserrat. On 18 April 1936 he went to Montserrat for the spiritual exercises but was adjourned in July 1936 due to the onslaught of the conflict in the area. In May 1938 he was forced to enter the republican military as a medical aide and was stationed there for a total period of eight months until January 1939 and was even promoted to captain; while in service he wrote about the horrors of the conflict he witnessed in his "War Diary".

His experiences made him feel that God wanted him to be a "doctor of souls" and so he became a priest; he commenced his studies for the priesthood on 29 September 1939 in Barcelona. It was during his studies that his mother died in 1941 at the time he received the minor orders; he was elevated to the diaconate on 22 March 1942. Claret was ordained to the priesthood on 30 May 1942. Claret's secret for a fulfilling spiritual life was to possess a strong ardent devotion to the Eucharist and for filial love to the Mother of God. After his ordination he was made the parochial vicar of the parish of Sant Esteve Sesrovires and in 1943 was sent to the Pontifical University of Salamanca for theological studies; he entered on 13 November 1944. He earned his theological degree in 1944.

He co-established – with Dr. Gerrado Manresa – his own clinic dedicated to the Blessed Mother for the ill but in particular for those who suffered from tuberculosis; he also ensured that the clinic would be able to cater to those people who could not afford adequate medical treatment. His automobile became what he called his "instrument of work" as a means of evangelizing people.

He was diagnosed with lymphatic cancer on 17 May 1950 and so offered his suffering to God; he said that his death was a chance "to die in a continual act of love and suffering ... worthy of the Heavenly Father". He died in his clinic on 31 August 1950. His remains were re-located to the parish church of San Vicente de Sarrià on 6 November 1975.

== Posthumous foundation ==
In 1985 the Archbishop of Barcelona Narcís Arnau founded the Foundation Pere Tarrés in honor of the late priest, a nonprofit devoted to charitable works.

== Beatification ==
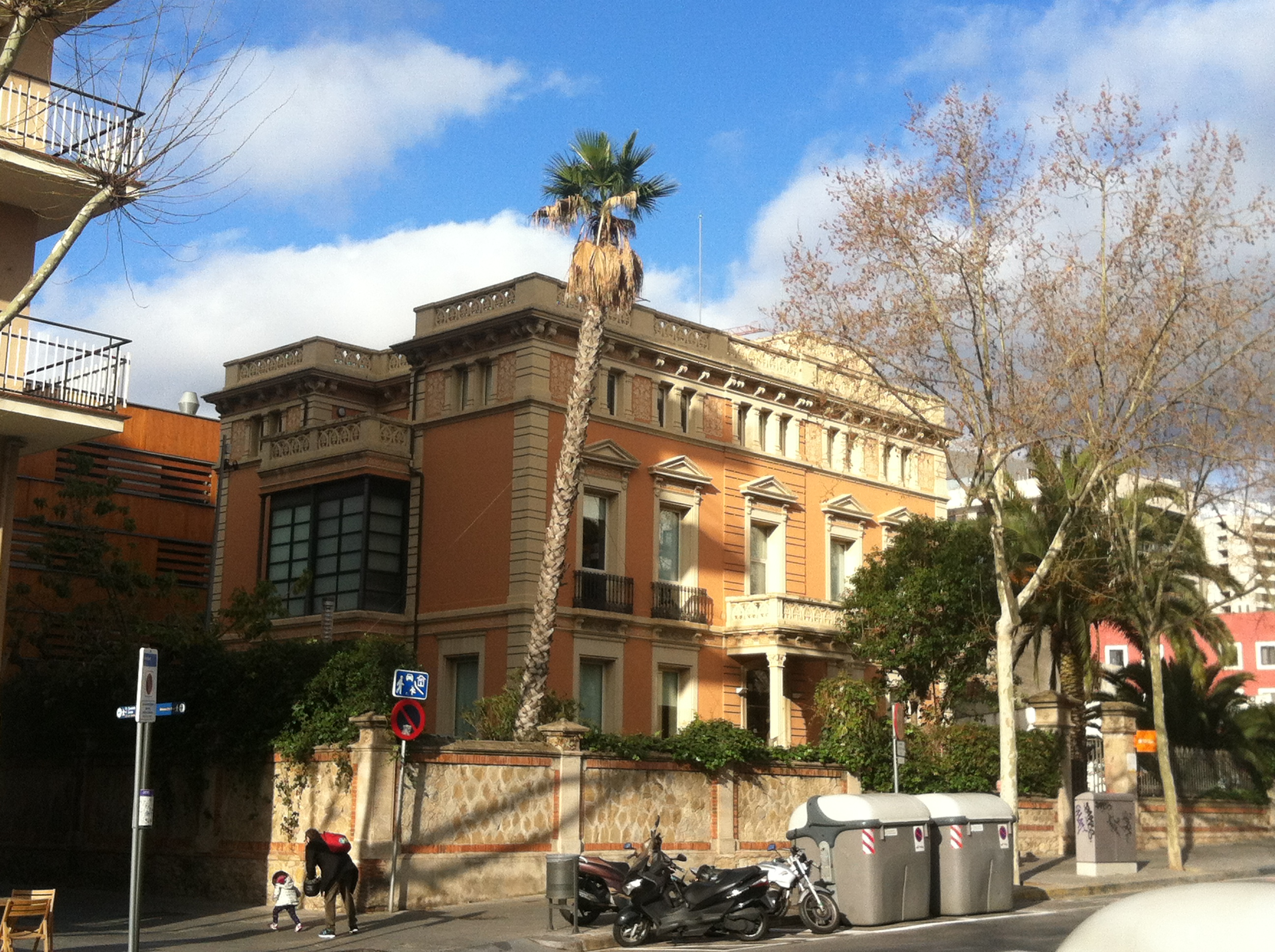
Foundation Pere Tarrés.

The beatification process received the approval of the Congregation for the Causes of Saints on 19 June 1980 and so granted Claret the title Servant of God, initiating the first stage of the process. The diocesan process in Barcelona was opened in 1982 and closed on 25 April 1990 after almost a decade of collating documentation and investigating Claret's life. Documentation was sent to Rome on 26 March 1993 and received validation from Roman officials, allowing the submission of the Positio in 1997 in order for further investigations to begin.

The miracle required for his beatification was investigated in its diocese of origin in a process that spanned from 2 March 1990 until 29 October 1991; all documents and testimonies were submitted to Roman officials by 2000. The C.C.S approved the cause on 5 April 2005, allowing Pope John Paul II to proclaim Claret to be Venerable on 22 June 2004. He beatified Claret in Loreto on 5 September 2004. Dr. Silvia Mónica Correale is the current postulator of the cause for canonization.

In Manresa, there is a street dedicated to him in the Barri de Sant Pau where the Medical Association and the Neighborhood Association organize an act of recognition and remembrance to him every May 30 (his liturgical day).
