= Stimorol =

Danish brand of chewing gum

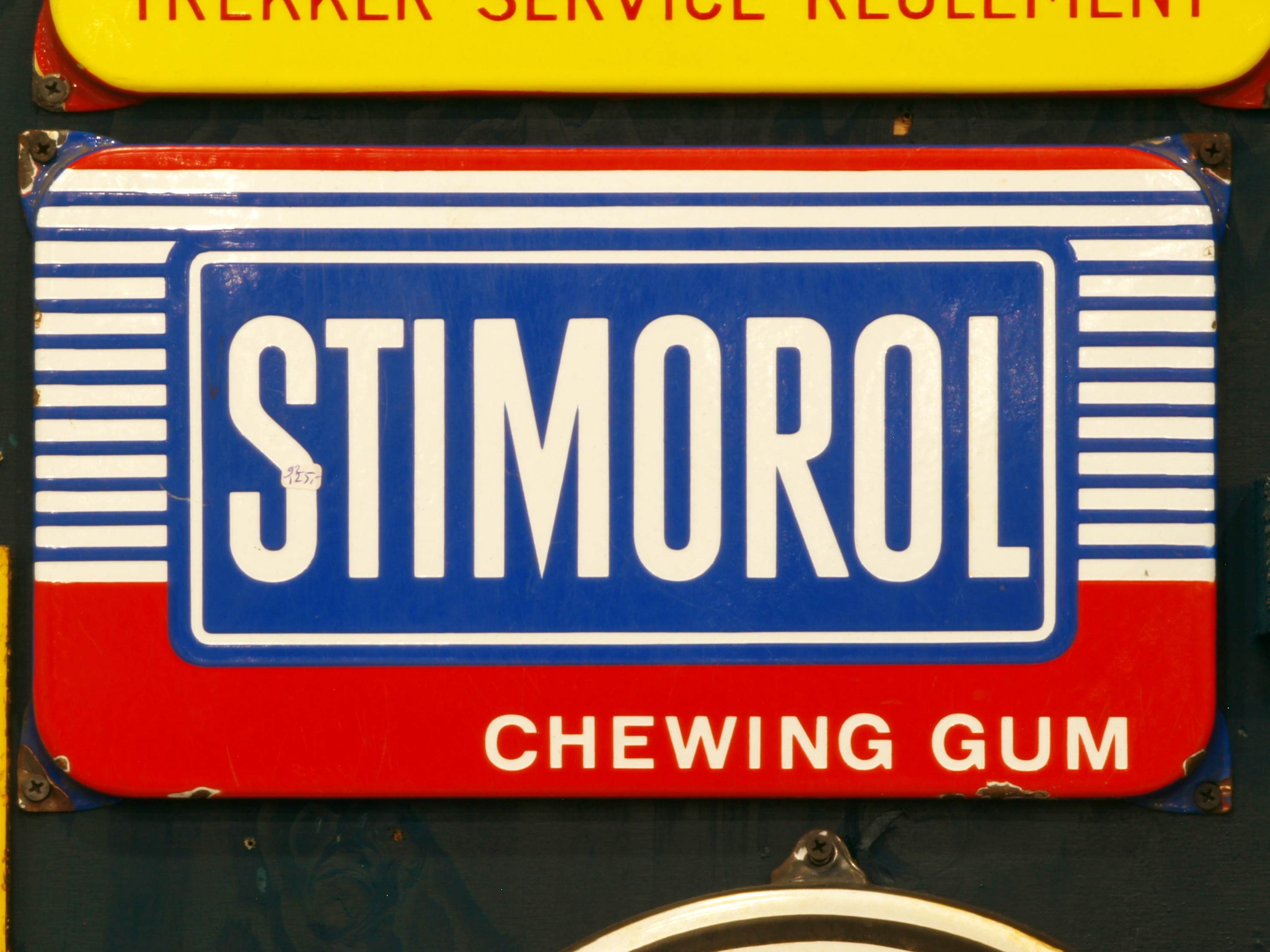
- Product type: Chewing gum
- Current owner: Perfetti Van Melle
- Country: Denmark
- Introduced: 1915; 111 years ago
- Previous owners: Dandy • Cadbury Schweppes • Kraft > Mondelez • Perfetti Van Melle

Stimorol is a brand of chewing gum originally produced by the Danish company Dandy and owned by the Italian-Dutch company Perfetti Van Melle since 2023.

== History ==
The privately owned company was founded by Holger Sørensen in 1915 in Vejle, Denmark as Vejle Caramel- og Tabletfabrik, later renamed Dansk Tyggegummifabrik A/S. It is one of the world's largest producers of chewing gum.

"Stimorol" is its primary brand of gum, which came onto the market in 1956. It was initially sold only in Scandinavia, but later became available in other countries throughout Europe, beginning with the Netherlands in 1959. In 1978, the company introduced a sugar-free gum, and by the 1990s it had various fruit and mint flavors.

In 2002, most of the company, including the well-known brands DANDY, STIMOROL, DIROL, and V6, were acquired by Cadbury-Schweppes, who rebranded it Trident. The remainder of the company was renamed Gumlink. Gumlink is owned by the Bagger-Sørensen family, who are the descendants of Holger Sørensen.

Since 2023, Stimorol has been owned by the Italian-Dutch company Perfetti van Melle, headquartered in Italy and The Netherlands.

== See also ==
- Trident
