= Smint =

Brand of breath mints

- Inception: 1990
- Manufacturer: Perfetti Van Melle
- Models: Sweetmint, Peppermint, Spearmint, Strawberry, Black mint
- Slogan: No Smint, no kiss Boost Yourself
- Website: www.smint.co.uk

Smint is a brand of sugar-free breath mints owned by the Italian-Dutch company Perfetti Van Melle. It is known for its distinctive packaging that dispenses one mint at a time, and for their Reuleaux triangle shape. The name is a portmanteau of "sugarfree" and "mint", not of "small mint" as is commonly thought.

== History ==
Smint was first conceived by Chupa Chups in 1990 as a sugar-free product targeted at adult consumers. After four years of development, Smint was introduced to the market as a subsidiary brand, and launched in the UK a year later in 1995. In 1996 Smint started their "No Smint, no kiss" campaign, aiming to make the brand name "smint" synonymous with "kissing breath".

By 2001, Smint was the top-selling mint in its class in 90% of the markets where it was available, and in the same year Smint started a partnership with Breast Cancer Care, donating 5p to the charity for every pack of strawberry Smint sold.

In 2006, Smint and Chupa Chups were taken over by Perfetti Van Melle. In 2009, Smint launched Smint-XXL tins in the UK, which are three times larger than regular Smint dispensers.

Smint is produced in Sittard, in a factory were Frisk is also made.

== Ingredients ==
Aspartame, xylitol, flavoring, and anticaking agent are used to make Smint in the UK. Xylitol has been demonstrated to have a plaque-reducing effect by attracting and starving the sucrose-seeking microorganisms that cause tooth decay, but a 2014 meta-analysis found that the claim has, at most, a weak effect tooth health.
