= Bubbaloo =

Latin American brand of bubble gum

- Former logo of Bubbaloo until its rebrand
- Product type: Bubble gum
- Current owner: Perfetti Van Melle
- Introduced: 1983; 43 years ago
- Previous owners: American Chicle Company > Adams Gum • Warner-Lambert > Pfizer • Cadbury Schweppes • Kraft > Mondelez • Perfetti Van Melle

Strawberry flavoured Bubbaloo

Bubbaloo is a Latin American brand of bubble gum owned by the Italian-Dutch company Perfetti Van Melle. They are small pieces of bubble gum with a liquid center.

Bubbaloo also contains BHT, an antioxidant food preservative.

Bubbaloo gum is available in a variety of flavors, including Chocolate, Mint, Blueberry, Strawberry, Cherry, Cola, Green Apple, Grape, Yerba Buena, Banana, Acilocowild, Pina Chamoy, Mix Fruit, Spearmint, Sour Grape, Sour Blueberry, and Tutti Frutt.

== History ==
Bubbaloo was the first bubblegum with a liquid center and made its debut in Mexican and Brazilian markets in 1983. Today, Bubbaloo is sold in more than 25 countries and in three different continents across the world.

In Mexico and Brazil, Bubbaloo has been one of the leading bubble gum brands and is widely recognised across multiple product categories, maintaining a leading position within the bubble gum market.

In addition, Bubba The Cat (the longtime brand icon and mascot), is often described as creative, original, ingenious and intelligent.

Bubbaloo launched in India in 2007.

In 2022, Mondelez sold their Bubbaloo gum brand, along with all of their other chewing gum brands operating in the United States, Canada and Europe to Perfetti Van Melle.
