= Perfetti Van Melle =

Italian–Dutch multinational company of confectionery and chewing gum

Perfetti Van Melle Group BV
- Logo used since 2001
- Type: Besloten vennootschap
- Traded as: Euronext Amsterdam: PVM; BIT: PVM
- Industry: Confectionery
- Predecessors: Perfetti SpA (1946–2001); Van Melle NV (1840– 2001)
- Founded: 2001; 25 years ago Italy/Netherlands
- Headquarters: Lainate, Italy; Breda, The Netherlands
- Area served: Worldwide
- Products: Confectionery
- Revenue: €2.65 billion (2019)
- Number of employees: 17,900 (2019)
- Website: www.perfettivanmelle.com

Perfetti Van Melle is an Italian–Dutch multinational company of confectionery and gum. It was formed in 2001 of the merger of the Italian-based company Perfetti SpA and the Dutch-based company Van Melle NV. Perfetti Van Melle is owned by the Italian Perfetti family and the Dutch Van Melle family. Perfetti Van Melle is headquartered in Lainate, Italy, and Breda, The Netherlands.

Perfetti Van Melle is the sixth-largest confectionery manufacturer in the world. It employs 17,000 people via 30 subsidiary companies and distributes its products in over 159 countries.

== History ==
=== Van Melle NV (1840–2001) ===
Van Melle NV
- Type: Naamloze vennootschap
- Industry: Confectionery
- Founded: 1840; 186 years ago
- Founder: Izaak, Michael and Pierre Van Melle
- Defunct: 2001; 25 years ago (as company)
- Fate: Merged with Perfetti SpA
- Successor: Perfetti Van Melle
- Headquarters: Breskens, Netherlands
- Area served: Worldwide
- Products: Candy
- Number of employees: 14,412 (2022)
- Website: www.vanmelle.com (2001 archive)

Van Melle NV was a Dutch confectionery company based in Breskens, Netherlands.

== Products ==
Some of the brands are:

- Airheads
- Alpenliebe
- Aprilla
- Big Babol
- Brooklyn
- Bubbaloo
- Bubblicious
- Cachou Lajaunie
- Center Fresh
- Center Fruit
- Center Shock
- Chiclets
- Chlormint
- Chocoliebe
- Chupa Chups
- Daygum
- Dentyne
- Filly Folly
- Frisk
- Fruit-tella
- Golia
- Happydent
- Hollywood
- Klene
- La Vosgienne
- Look-O-Look
- Marbels
- Meller
- Mentos
- Morositas
- Smint
- Stimorol
- StopNot
- Sula
- Tabù
- Trident
- V6
- Vigorsol
- Vivident

Mentos sugar-free manufactured by Perfetti Van Melle
