= Hollywood (gum) =

French chewing gum brand

Hollywood is a French brand of chewing gum owned by the Italian-Dutch company Perfetti Van Melle since 2023.

== History ==
The brand was created in 1952 by Courtland E. Parfet, an American who took part in the Invasion of Normandy in 1944.

The first published advertisement for the brand appears in 1958, and the first television advertisement in 1968. The slogan Fraîcheur de Vivre ("Freshness of life") was coined in 1972 by Jean Verrecchia, based on the concepts of youth, freedom, and freshness.

In 1986, a sugar-free variation called Hollywood Light was launched, followed by Hollywood Blancheur ("Hollywood Whitener") in 2001.
