= Trident (gum) =

Sugar-free chewing gum brand

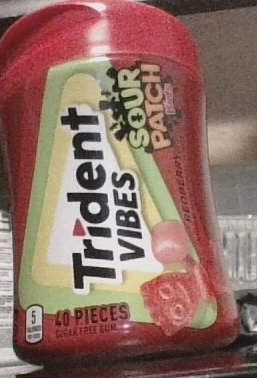
- Trident Vibes container
- Product type: Chewing gum
- Current owner: Perfetti Van Melle (2023–pres.)
- Country: United States
- Introduced: 1960; 66 years ago
- Related brands: Dentyne
- Previous owners: List: American Chicle Company (1960–62); Warner–Lambert (1962–2000); Pfizer (2000–02); Cadbury Schweppes (2002–10); Kraft (2010–12); Mondelez (2012–23)
- Website: tridentgum.com

Trident is a brand of sugar-free chewing gum owned by the Italian-Dutch company Perfetti Van Melle. It was originally introduced by American Chicle Company in 1960 shortly before it was bought by Warner-Lambert in 1962. It reached the United Kingdom in 2007 when it was introduced by its then-owner Cadbury Schweppes in the United Kingdom.

Trident is sold in more than 70 countries around the world, but sometimes marketed under different names. The gum is called Stimorol across much of Europe and Africa, Beldent in Argentina, First in Turkey, Dirol in Russia, and Hollywood in France.

== History ==
American Chicle Company introduced sugar-free Trident gum in 1960. Two years later, the business was purchased by Warner-Lambert.

Trident expanded internationally in 1970, entering the Canadian, Spanish, and Swiss markets. When Trident television advertisements began airing in the 1970s, Trident sales went from $27 million worldwide in 1973 to $80 million in 1976. By 1977, Trident was the best selling sugarless gum on the market. During the 1970s, Chicle stopped making the sugar-based Black Jack, Clove, and Beemans gums in order to shift resources to Trident and Freshen Up. The gum was manufactured in Chicle's Long Island City factory until Warner-Lambert closed it in 1981.

Trident was manufactured by the Chicle subsidiary of Warner-Lambert until 1997, when it became Adams. On November 4th, 1999, Warner-Lambert announced its intentions to merge with American Home Products before Pfizer stepped in and offered more money. The $90.2 billion deal was announced in February 2000. Following a two-year bar on selling the candy division, Pfizer sold Adams to Cadbury Schweppes for $4.2 billion in December 2002. By 2005, Trident's worldwide sales grew by 20%. It first reached market in 2007. By March, the gum had captured 12% of the market.

In 2010, Kraft Foods acquired Cadbury for $19.6 billion. By 2011, Trident led the US gum market with a 23.8 percent share of the industry. When Kraft announced in 2012 that it would split into two companies, Trident became part of Mondelez International. The Trident brand launched China in 2015.

In 2022, Mondelez announced it would divest its gum brands, including Trident, in North America and Europe. In 2023, Mondelez sold its gum portfolio, including Trident, to European confectionery manufacturer Perfetti Van Melle.

== Products ==
=== Original ===
Trident Original is the first variant of the Trident product. The gum is contained in packs of 14 wrapped sticks and comes in 12 flavors, including Original, Spearmint, Bubblegum, Tropical Twist, Cinnamon, Watermelon Twist, Perfect Peppermint, Wintergreen, Mint Bliss, Pineapple Twist, Minty Sweet Twist, and Island Berry Lime.

=== Trident Advantage ===
In the 1990s, Trident Advantage was introduced with Recaldent, a proprietary ingredient that had been clinically proven to strengthen teeth.

=== Trident White ===
Trident began selling Trident White in 2001. It was launched to focus on the gum’s reported ability to help whiten teeth.

=== Trident Splash ===
Trident Splash, introduced in 2005 for the US and Canada markets, is a hard-coated pellet with a liquid center. It advertises two flavors in one, and was initially sold in peppermint-vanilla and strawberry-lime. In 2009, Strawberry-Lemon, Raspberry-Peach, Spearmint, and Lemon-Mint were introduced in UAE.

=== Trident Xtra Care ===
Introduced in 2008, Trident Xtra Care is billed as a sugarless gum that can help replenish minerals in teeth. Upon launch, Cadbury Adams had exclusive rights to use Recaldent, a type of milk-based calcium, in chewing gum. The first two flavors were peppermint and cool mint. Trident's marketing claims have been challenged in court and investigated by the FDA.

The brand is called Xtra Care in US, Canada, and Mexico markets, Trident Total in Colombia and Brazil, Beldent in Argentina, and Recaldent in Thailand and Japan.

=== Trident Sweet Kicks ===
In 2008, Trident introduced its Sweet Kicks chocolate-flavored gum in the UK and Mexico markets.

=== Trident Fresh ===
Introduced to the UK market in 2008, Trident Fresh focuses on freshness and flavor. It came in peppermint, spearmint, and lemon.

=== Trident Layers ===
In 2009, Trident Layers introduced a layered gum that advertised multiple flavor profiles. The first flavors were Wild Strawberry & Tangy Orange and Green Apple & Golden Pineapple, followed by Cool Mint & Melon Fresco in 2010.

=== Trident Vitality ===
In 2011, Cadbury introduced a Trident sub-brand called Vitality, which included gum fortified with ingredients such as vitamin C and ginseng. The line was discontinued in 2014 due to low sales.

=== Trident Unwrapped ===
Trident Unwrapped debuted in 2014 in the US market as slab gum in bottle packaging.

=== Trident Vibes ===
Trident Vibes is a version of the gum created in 2018. Each unit contains 40 unwrapped cube-like pieces. This version of the gum comes in flavors such as "Sour Berry Twist", "Tropical Beat", "Spearmint Rush", and the Sour Patch Kids flavors of Redberry, Blue Raspberry, and Watermelon.

== Advertising ==
Trident signs at a convenience stores in Hamilton, Ontario

When it was introduced in 1960, Trident used the slogan "The Great Taste that Is Good for Your Teeth." Canadian Chicle's marketing was one of the first national campaigns to promote dental health through chewing gum.

For years, Trident was promoted with the slogan, "Four out of five dentists surveyed recommend sugarless gum for their patients who chew gum". This slogan is believed to have been based on the results of a survey of practicing dentists with either D.D.S. or D.M.D. degrees, apparently conducted in the early 1960s, whose patients included frequent users of chewing gums; the percentage of respondents to the survey whose responses indicated they would make such references to their patients is believed to have been approximately 80%, rounded off to the nearest full percentage point, of the total number of respondents. It became strongly associated with the Trident brand.

In the early 2000s, "See what Unfolds" became the new slogan for the brand.

Trident gum contains the sugar alcohol xylitol, which is known as a "tooth-friendly" sugar. Use of the chemical has been subject to controversy, as it is highly toxic to dogs.

== See also ==
- Dentyne
