= V2 Records =

British record label

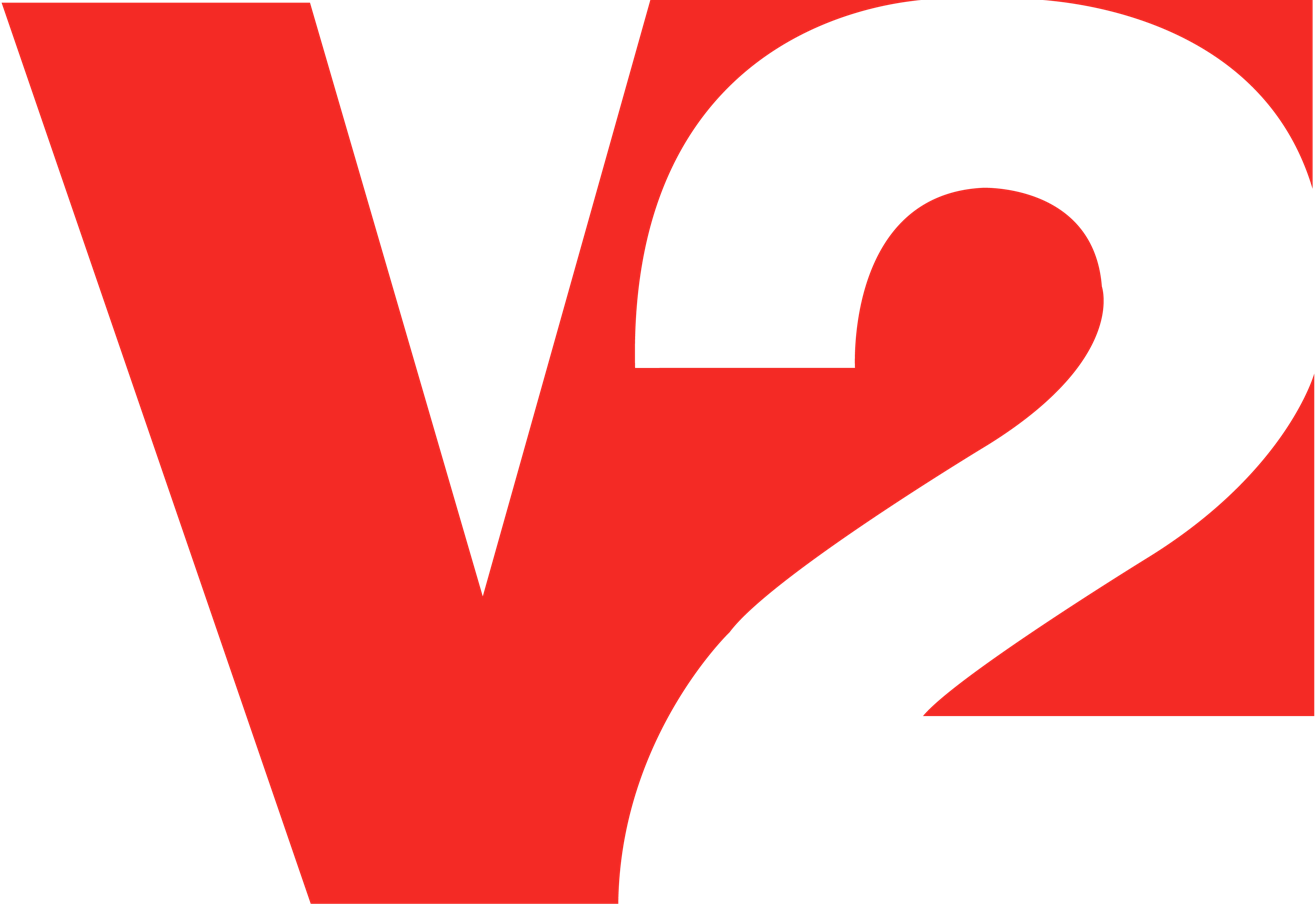
- Parent company: Universal Music Group
- Founded: 1996
- Founder: Richard Branson
- Distributor: Virgin Music Group
- Genre: Various
- Country of origin: United Kingdom
- Location: 32 1211 GN Hilversum The Netherlands
- Official website: v2benelux.com

V2 Records (or V2 Music and V2 Benelux; V2 being an abbreviation for Virgin 2) is a record label that was purchased by Universal Music Group in 2007, sold to PIAS in 2013 and partially acquired by Universal in 2022 (as part of larger PIAS 49% equity acquisition). In 2024, Universal acquired the remaining 51% of PIAS that it did not already own. In Benelux, V2 would operate separately from PIAS from 2013 to 2022, since the label was bought from Universal in 2007, henceforth Universal Music Group fully owns V2.

== History ==
The label was founded in 1996 by Richard Branson, five years after he sold Virgin Records to EMI. V2 management was led by the same individuals that built Branson's balloon and the control position was held by a Canadian public corporation. The company was restructured after running into financial difficulties with Branson taking control and reinventing the brand.

The label was owned 95% by Morgan Stanley, the chief financier of the company, and 5% by Branson. Over the years V2 acquired Gee Street Records, Junior Boy's Own, Blue Dog Records, and Big Cat Records. The label also distributed many labels, such as Wichita, Fania, Luaka Bop, City Slang and Modular. Stereophonics were the first band to sign to the label.

V2 now operates in Australia, Belgium, Canada, France, Germany, Italy, Greece, Netherlands, Spain, Ireland, Sweden, the United Kingdom, and the United States. It was distributed in the US by BMG; however it left for WEA shortly after the formation of Sony BMG. Its headquarters were located at 14 East 4th Street in Manhattan, the former US home of Island Records, which was in the same building as the former Greenwich Village branch of Tower Records.

In April 2005, Cooperative Music was set up by the V2 Music Group as a transnational marketing and distribution operation which licenses independent labels, as opposed to individual artist companies which is the standard industry practice, for release in Europe, Australia and Japan. This in-house licensing division has an exclusive international marketing team with representation in the UK, Ireland, France, Germany, Italy, Spain, Holland, Belgium, Sweden, Norway, Denmark, Australia and Japan.

In May 2006, much of V2's catalogue, including multi-platinum artists Moby and The White Stripes, was added to eMusic, making the label one of the most high-profile featured on the online music site, which mostly sells DRM-free independent music at a cost considerably lower than many of its competitors.

In August 2007, V2 Music Group was sold for £7 million to Universal Music Group. Subsequently, in October 2007, UMG partnered the US operations of its independent distribution arm Fontana Distribution, known as Fontana International, with London-based Cooperative Music of V2 Music. The intent was to enhance expansion through international agreements, and so independent labels from Europe under Cooperative Music would gain access to the independent American marketplace through Fontana International's diverse connections in independent marketing, promotion and distribution support. Cooperative Music has had significant success with various acts such as Fleet Foxes, Phoenix and The Black Keys.

In 2013, [PIAS] has acquired Cooperative Music (including V2) from Universal Music Group.

In November 2022, Universal Music Group purchased a 49% stake in [PIAS] (including V2).

=== V2 Benelux ===
V2 Benelux was founded by Richard Branson in 1997 as part of the V2 International group with affiliates in USA, UK, Scandinavia, Germany, France, Italy and Benelux. In February 2007 the directors of V2 Benelux, Chris Boog and Tom Willinck, rounded off a successful management buy out together with their distributor, Bertus Distribution part of the Artone Group. The Artone Group consists of V2 Records Benelux, Bertus Distribution, Townsend Music and Record Industry. V2 Records Benelux has offices in Netherlands, France, Germany and Belgium.

=== V2 North America ===
In 2006 Branson sold V2 North America to Sheridan Square Entertainment LLC (SSE) for $15 million. SSE then merged its label Artemis Records into V2 North America. The new label was effectively divested from the Virgin Group. Sheridan Square was later acquired by IndieBlu, which itself was acquired by Entertainment One.

On 12 January 2007, V2 North America announced that it was undergoing restructuring to focus on its back catalogue and digital distribution. As a result, their employees were let go and their roster of artists left as free agents.

== See also ==
- List of record labels
