= Blue Dog Records =

Independent London record label

- Parent company: V2 Records
- Founded: 1997
- Founder: Nick Moore, Jeremy Ledlin
- Status: Defunct
- Distributor(s): PIAS
- Genre: Indie rock, post-punk, various
- Country of origin: UK
- Location: The Falcon, Camden, London

Blue Dog Records was an independent London record label located in offices above the original Barfly Club (The Falcon, Camden). Started in 1997 by Nick Moore and Jeremy Ledlin it was licensed and distributed by Richard Branson's V2 Records, and had a mostly guitar band roster of artists including The Crocketts, Daytona, Contempo, Murry the Hump, Sona Fariq and Super J Lounge.

Many of the acts who released their first singles on Blue Dog were then snapped up by bigger labels, with Sona Fariq signing to Warners, Contempo signing to London, Murry the Hump signing to Beggars Banquet, and Crashland to Independiente/Sony.

The label dissolved in 2000 due to funding cuts from V2 Records and the label's main artist The Crocketts transforming into The Crimea. Moore set up short lived online label Animal Noise that continued to work with Alchemicals, The Disorientee and also released records by Baby Bird & Carina Round.

== Singles Club ==
As well as album releases for The Crocketts and Daytona, the label also ran a Singles Club. Twelve singles were released on 7 inch vinyl and are now sought after, particularly the Contempo single which is the first release from the band Hard-Fi.

1. Sona Fariq, "So Perfect"
2. De Virpsha, "If You Want It"
3. Altastate, "Throw Back the Veil"
4. S.P.E.C.T.R.E., "Ground Sound"
5. Murray The Hump, "The Green Green Grass of Home"
6. Otis, Ed & Ben, "Tunes"
7. Contempo, "On the Floor"
8. Alchemicals, "Information Centre"
9. Disorientee, "Daddy White Doctor"
10. Super J Lounge, "Wire & Wheels"
11. Mr. Baker, "Mr. Baker"
12. The Fringe, "Lady James Day"
13. Crashland, "New Perfume" / "Out Like a Light"

== See also ==
- List of record labels
