= Timeline of food =

This is a timeline of human food and food-related cultural habits, as well as those of our closest extinct relatives. The cut-off point for inclusion is the separation of the Hominina from Pan, the genus that includes modern-day chimpanzees.

== Prehistoric times ==
- 5-2 million years ago: Hominids shift away from the consumption of nuts and berries to begin the consumption of meat.

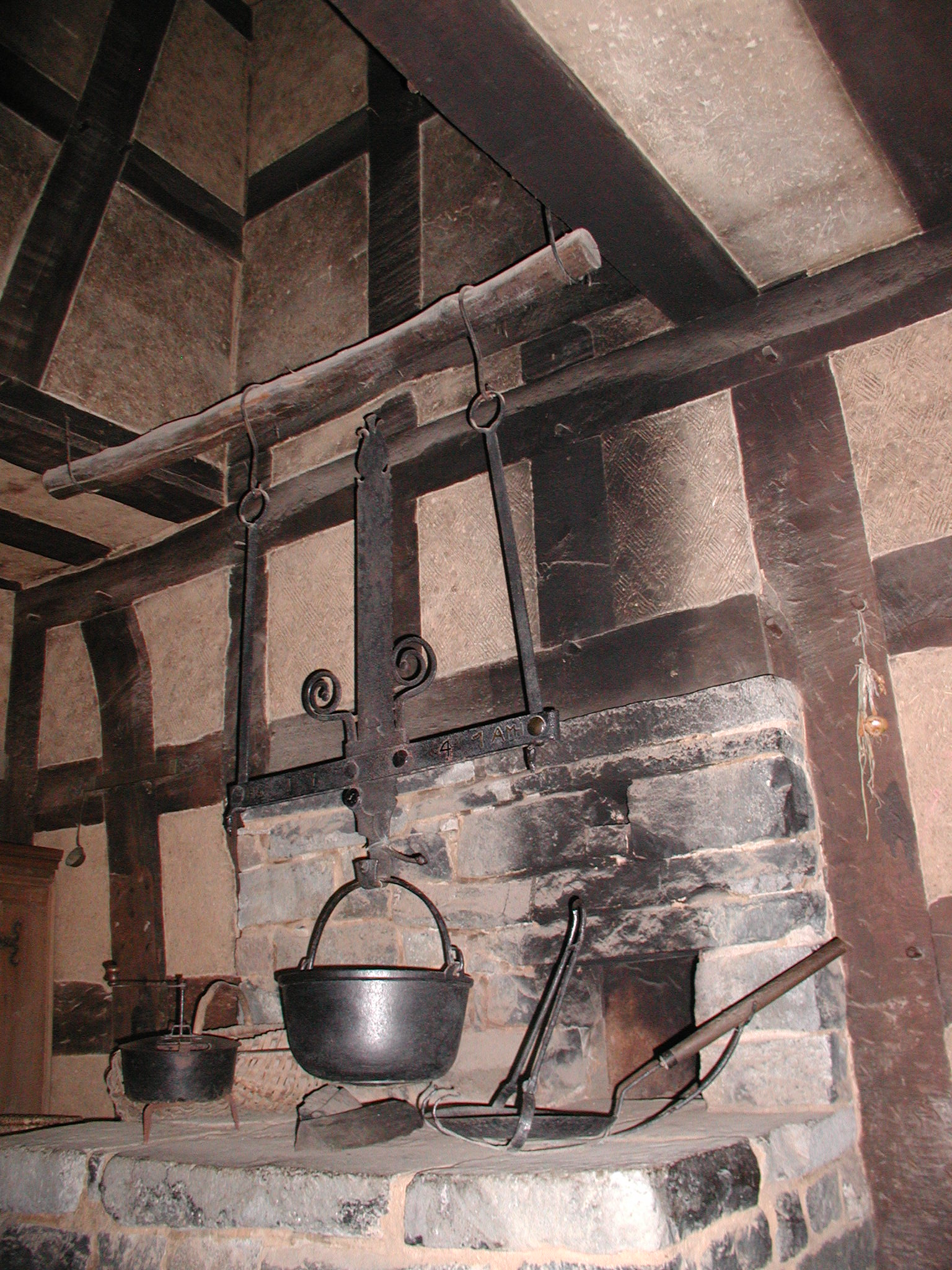
A hearth with cooking utensils

- 2.5-1.8 million years ago: The discovery of the use of fire may have created a sense of sharing as a group. Earliest estimate for invention of cooking, by phylogenetic analysis.
- 250,000 years ago: Earliest uncontroversial archaeological evidence of hearths.
- 170,000 years ago: Cooked starchy roots and tubers in Africa.
- 40,000 years ago: First evidence of human fish consumption: isotopic analysis of the skeletal remains of Tianyuan man, a modern human from eastern Asia, has shown that he regularly consumed freshwater fish.
- 30,000 years ago: Earliest archaeological evidence for flour, which was likely processed into an unleavened bread, dates to the Upper Palaeolithic in Europe.
- 25,000 years ago: The fish-gorge, a kind of fish hook, appears.
- 13,000 BCE: Contentious evidence of oldest domesticated rice in Korea. Their 15,000-year age challenges the accepted view that rice cultivation originated in China about 12,000 years ago. These findings were received by academia with strong skepticism, and the results and their publicizing has been cited as being driven by a combination of nationalist and regional interests.
- 12,500 BCE: The oldest evidence of bread-making, found in a Natufian site in Jordan's northeastern desert.
- 11,500 - 6200 BCE: Genetic evidence published in the Proceedings of the National Academy of Sciences of the United States of America (PNAS) shows that all forms of Asian rice, both indica and japonica, spring from a single domestication that occurred 8,200–13,500 years ago in China of the wild rice Oryza rufipogon.

== Neolithic ==
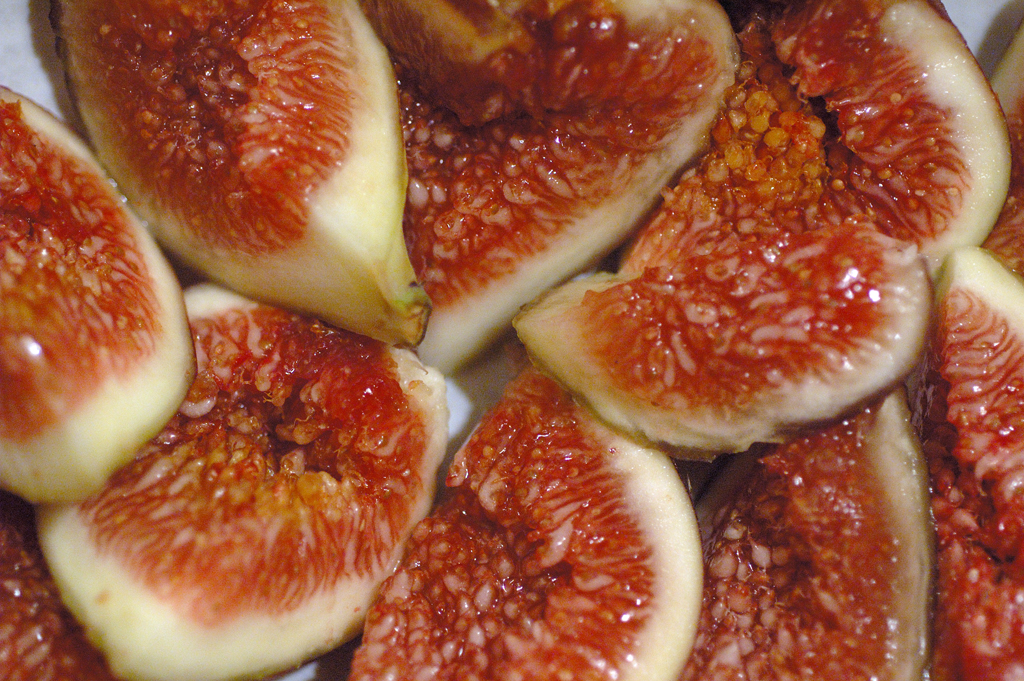
Fresh figs cut open showing the flesh and seeds inside

- ~9300 BCE: Figs cultivated in the Jordan Valley
- ~8000 BCE: Squash was grown in Mexico
- 8000-5000 BCE: Archaeological and palaeoenvironmental evidence of banana cultivation at Kuk Swamp in the Western Highlands Province of Papua New Guinea.
- 8000-5000 BCE: Earliest domestication of potato in the neighbourhood of Lake Titicaca.
- ~8000 BCE: Wild olives were collected by Neolithic peoples
- ~7000 BCE: Cereal (grain) production in Syria
- ~7000 BCE: Farmers in China began to farm rice and millet, using man-made floods and fires as part of their cultivation regimen.
- ~7000 BCE: Maize-like plants, derived from the wild teosinte, began to be seen in Mexico.
- ~7000 BCE: Chinese villagers were brewing fermented alcoholic drinks on small and individual scale, with the production process and methods similar to that of ancient Egypt and Mesopotamia.
- ~7000 BCE: Sheep, originating from western Asia, were domesticated with the help of dogs prior to the establishment of settled agriculture.
- 7000-5000 BCE: Pumpkin fragments found in Mexico are the oldest evidence of Cucurbita pepo.
- 6570-4530 BCE: Earliest and controversial estimation of rice cultivation in India.
- 6140-4550 BCE: Archaeological evidence of fish processing and long-term storage at the Atlit-Yam site, in what is now Israel.
- ~6000 BCE: Grapes were first grown for wine in the Southern Caucasus.
- ~5500 BCE: Earliest secure evidence of cheesemaking in Kujawy, Poland.
- ~5000 BCE: Cattle were domesticated in Mesopotamia after settled agriculture was established
- ~5000 BCE: Modern-like maize varieties appear.
- ~5000 BCE: Beans begin to be cultivated in the Americas.
- ~5000 BCE: Fossilized remains of possibly cultivated potato tubers on a cave floor in Chilca Canyon.

== 4000-2000 BCE ==
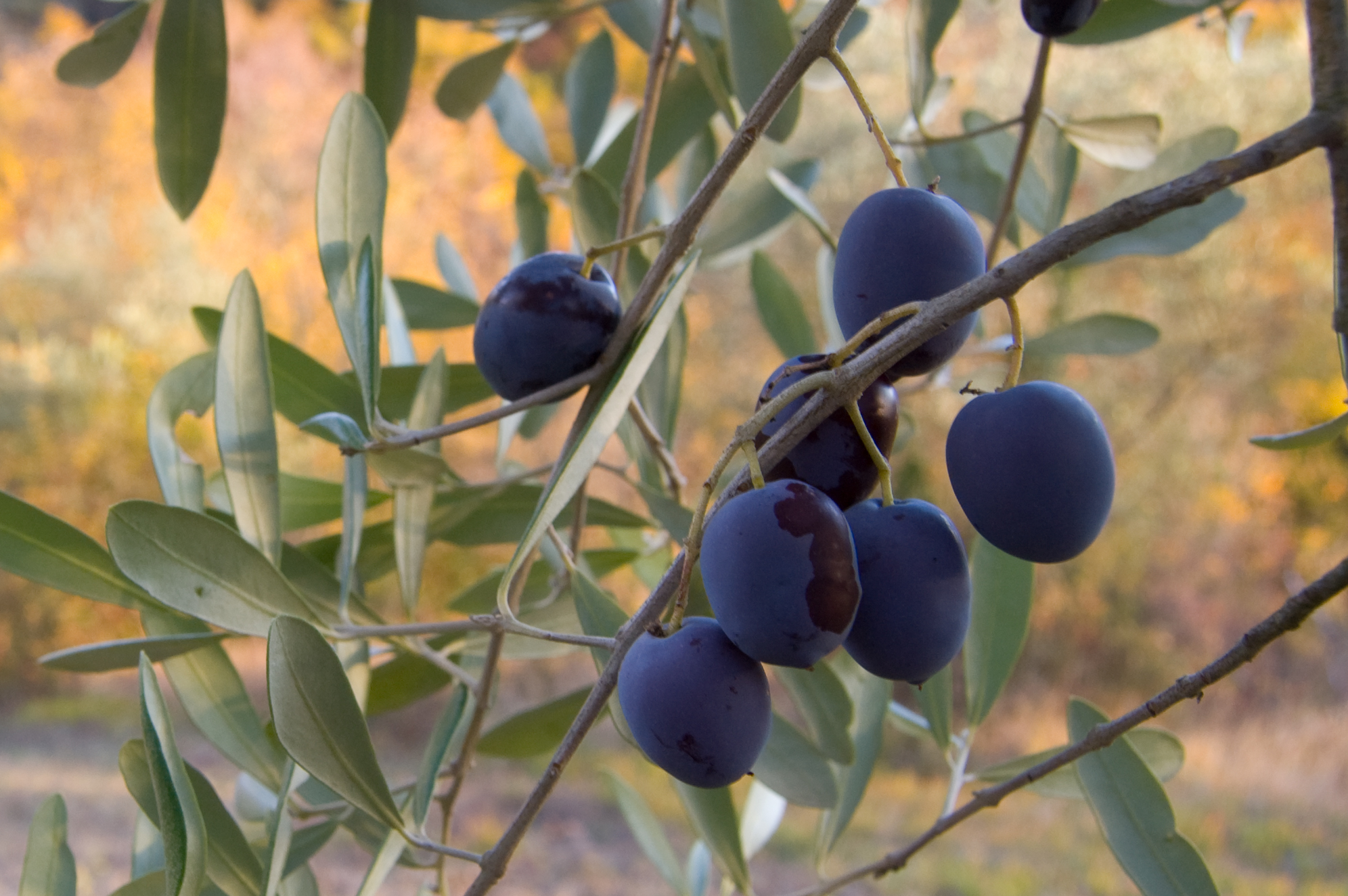
Ripening olives

- Earliest archaeological evidence for leavened bread is from ancient Egypt. The extent to which bread was leavened in ancient Egypt remains uncertain.
- 4500–3500 BCE: Earliest clear evidence of olive domestication and olive oil extraction.
- ~4000 BCE: Watermelon, originally domesticated in central Africa, becomes an important crop in northern Africa and southwestern Asia.
- ~4000 BCE: Agriculture reaches north-eastern Europe.
- ~4000 BCE: Dairy is documented in the grasslands of the Sahara.
- 4000 BCE: Citron seeds in Mesopotamian excavations.
- ~3900 BCE: In Mesopotamia (Ancient Iraq), early evidence of beer is a Sumerian poem honoring Ninkasi, the patron goddess of brewing, which contains the oldest surviving beer recipe, describing the production of beer from barley via bread.
- ~3600 BCE: Date of the oldest definitive known evidence for popcorn, discovered in New Mexico, United States. It is attributed to the Ancestral Puebloan peoples, who maintained trade networks with peoples in tropical Mexico.
- ~3500 BCE: Beer produced in what is today Iran.
- ~3500 BCE: Aquaculture starts in China with the farming of the common carp.
- ~3500–3000 BCE: Several breeds of sheep were established in ancient Mesopotamia and Egypt.
- ~3000 BCE: Palm oil found in a tomb in Abydos.
- ~3000 BCE: Grape cultivation for wine had spread to the Fertile Crescent, the Jordan Valley and Egypt.
- ~3000 BCE: Sunflowers are first cultivated in North America.
- ~3000 BCE: South America's Andes region cultivates potato.
- ~3000 BCE: Archaeological evidence of watermelon cultivation in ancient Egypt. Watermelons appeared on wall paintings; seeds and leaves were deposited in tombs.
- ~3000 BCE: Beer was spread through Europe by Germanic and Celtic tribes
- ~3000 BCE: Two alabaster jars found at Saqqara, dating from the First Dynasty of Egypt, contained cheese. These were placed in the tomb about 3000 BC.
- ~2500 BCE: Domestic pigs, which are descended from wild boars, are known to have existed about 2500 BC in modern-day Hungary and in Troy; earlier pottery from Jericho and Egypt depicts wild pigs.
- ~2500 BCE: Pearl millet was domesticated in the Sahel region of West Africa, evidence for the cultivation of pearl millet in Mali.
- 2500–1500 BCE: Time range of several sites with archaeological evidence of potato being consumed and cultivated in the South American continent.
- 2000–1500 BCE: Rice cultivation in the upper and middle Ganges begins.
- ~2000 BCE: Visual evidence of Egyptian cheesemaking found in Egyptian tomb murals.

== 2000–1 BCE ==
- ~1900 BCE: Evidence for cheese (GA.UAR in Sumerian language) in the Sumerian cuneiform texts of Third Dynasty of Ur.
- ~1900 BCE: Evidence of chocolate drinks in Mokaya and other pre-Olmec people.
- ~1500 BCE: Rice cultivated in the Niger area.
- ~1100 BCE: Egyptians can purchase a flat (unleavened) bread called ta from stalls in the village streets.
- ~1000 BCE: Rice cultivation spreads to the Middle East and Madagascar.
- ~1000 BCE: Lower bound for the cultivation of cucumbers in the western Asia.
- 500 BCE: At this date, tomato was already being cultivated in southern Mexico and probably other areas.
- 5th century BCE: Garum was used in Greek cuisine.
- ~400 BCE: Confirmed written evidence of ancient beer production in Armenia, from Xenophon's Anabasis.
- 327–324 BCE: Alexander the Great expedition to India brings the knowledge of rice to Romans. However rice did not enter as a cultivated crop: The Romans preferred to import rice wine instead.
- ~300 BCE: Citron brought to Greece by Alexander the Great.
- 3rd century BCE: Radishes enter the historical record.
- ~200 BCE: Citron brought to Palestine by Greek colonists.
- 1st century BCE: Horace mentions Spanish garum (Satires, II.8.46); Spain dominates the fish market.

== 1–1000 CE ==
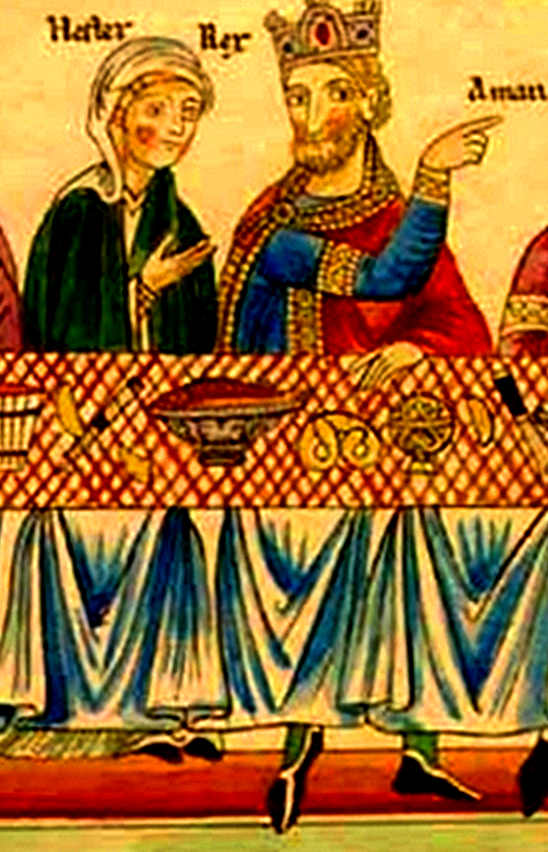
Pretzel depicted at a banquet of Queen Esther and King Ahasuerus. 12th century Hortus deliciarum.

- 5th century: Bok choy originates in China.
- 5th century: The Roman cuisine cookbook Apicius, or De re coquinaria is published.
- 610: Possible invention of the pretzel. According to some narratives in 610 CE "... [a]n Italian monk invents pretzels as a reward to children who learn their prayers. He calls the strips of baked dough, folded to resemble arms crossing the chest, 'pretiola' ('little reward[s]')".
- 8th century: The original type of sushi, known today as narezushi (馴れ寿司, 熟寿司), first developed in Southeast Asia and spread to south China, is introduced to Japan.
- 8th century: Chronicles from monasteries mention Roquefort being transported across the Alps
- ~800: Cod become an important economic commodity in international markets. This market has lasted for more than 1,000 years, enduring the Black Death, wars and other crises, and it is still an important Norwegian fish trade.
- ~800: By this date, watermelon reached India.
- 9th century: First record of cucumber cultivation in France
- 822: First mention of hops added to beer, by the Carolingian abbot Adalard of Corbie
- 879: Gorgonzola cheese is mentioned for the first time.
- 961: Watermelons, introduced by the Moorish, reported to be cultivated in Cordoba, Spain.
- 997: The term "pizza" first appears "in a Latin text from the southern Italian town of Gaeta [...], which claims that a tenant of certain property is to give the bishop of Gaeta 'duodecim pizze' ['twelve pizzas'] every Christmas Day, and another twelve every Easter Sunday".

== 1000–1500 ==
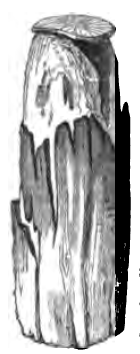
Bog butter from A Descriptive Catalogue of the Antiquities in the Museum of the Royal Irish Academy, 1857

- 11th–14th centuries: Ireland stored and aged butter in peat bogs, being known as bog butter. The practice is effectively ended by the 19th century.
- ~1100: Wafers are introduced from France into Britain, by the Normans. They were cake-like, however, not crisp like what we today call wafers.
- ~1100: Watermelons reach China.
- 12th century: Oldest butter export of Europe, from Scandinavia
- 1158: Evidence of watermelons cultivated in Seville.
- 1170: Cheddar cheese documented: A pipe roll of King Henry II from 1170 records the purchase of 10,240 lb (4,640 kg) at a farthing per pound (totaling £10.13s.4d.)
- 1266: The first written references to genever (or jenever), or Dutch gin. Flemish poet Jacob van Maerlant described how to add parts of the juniper tree to spirits in his book Der Naturen Bloeme.
- 14th century: First record of cucumber cultivation in Great Britain.
- 1390: The English cookbook, The Forme of Cury, published, including one of the earliest recipes for frumenty
- 15th century: The Portuguese began fishing cod
- ~1450: Written records of palm oil being used as food from European travelers to West Africa.
- 1494: First record of cucumbers cultivation by the Spanish in Hispaniola, Caribbean islands.
- 15th–16th centuries: Rice enters the Caribbean.

== 16th century ==
- 16th century: first mention of hasty pudding
- 1516: William IV, Duke of Bavaria, adopted the Reinheitsgebot (purity law), perhaps the oldest food-quality regulation still in use in the 21st century, according to which the only allowed ingredients of beer are water, hops and barley-malt.
- 1521: Spanish conquistador Hernán Cortés may have been the first to transfer a small yellow tomato to Europe after he captured the Aztec city of Tenochtitlan, now Mexico City.
- 1530: Maize introduced into Spain by Hernán Cortés from Mexico
- 1535: Spanish conquerors first see potato.
- 1544: The earliest discussion of the tomato in European literature appeared in a herbal written in 1544 by Pietro Andrea Mattioli, an Italian physician and botanist.
- 1548: First recorded instance of tomatoes in Italy: on 31 October, the house steward of Cosimo de' Medici, the grand duke of Tuscany, wrote to the Medici private secretary informing him that the basket of tomatoes sent from the grand duke's Florentine estate at Torre del Gallo "had arrived safely".
- ~1550: First mention of cucumber cultivation in North America.
- ~1570: First potato specimens probably reach Spain.
- 1573: Potatoes are purchased by the Hospital de la Sangre in Seville.
- 1576: Watermelons cultivated in Florida by Spanish settlers.
- 1578: Sir Francis Drake meets potatoes in his trip around the world. However he does not bring potatoes back to Great Britain, despite common misconception.
- 1583-1613: Guaman Poma de Ayala writes a chronicle of the Incas where he describes and depicts potato and maize cultivation.
- 1584: Grits first introduced to European explorers by Native Americans in Roanoke, North Carolina
- 1585: First recorded commercial shipment of chocolate to Europe, in a shipment from Veracruz to Seville
- 1590: José de Acosta described chuño in his chronicles.
- 1596: Caspar Bauhin, Swiss botanist, first described potato scientifically in his Phytopinax, assigning it the current binomial name Solanum tuberosum. However he conjectured potatoes could cause wind and leprosy (because of a vague resemblance to leprous organs) and that they were aphrodisiac.
- Before 17th century: Watermelon appears in herbals in mainland Europe, outside Spain. It also begins to spread among Native American populations.
- Late 16th century–17th century: Cucumber, along with maize, beans, squash, pumpkins, and gourds are cultivated by Native Americans in what is today southern United States and, later, the region of Great Plains.

== 17th century ==
- 17th century: Sparkling wine first appears.
- ~1600: William Shakespeare refers to ship biscuits in As You Like It, more resembling modern crackers.
- 1605: References to puff pastry, made by placing butter between sheets of rolled dough.
- 1605: References to rolled wafers.
- 1606: Goldwasser, a gold-infused liqueur and progenitor of Goldschläger, first created in Poland.
- 1607: Hominy first introduced to European explorers by Native Americans in Jamestown, Virginia
- 1609: A trial planting in Virginia is the first cultivation of Rice in the United States.
- 1625: Watermelons are widespread in Europe, as a minor garden crop.
- 1629: First introduction of watermelons in North America, in Massachusetts.
- ~1650: Watermelons are now common around the New World.
- 1650-1765: Spreading of potato cultivation in the Netherlands.
- 1651: The government mandates the cultivation of potatoes in Germany.
- 1660: The Accomplisht Cook, an English cookery book published by the professional cook Robert May
- 1662: The British Royal Society sponsors the cultivation of potatoes.
- 1692: The earliest discovered cookbook with tomato recipes was published in Naples.

== 18th century ==
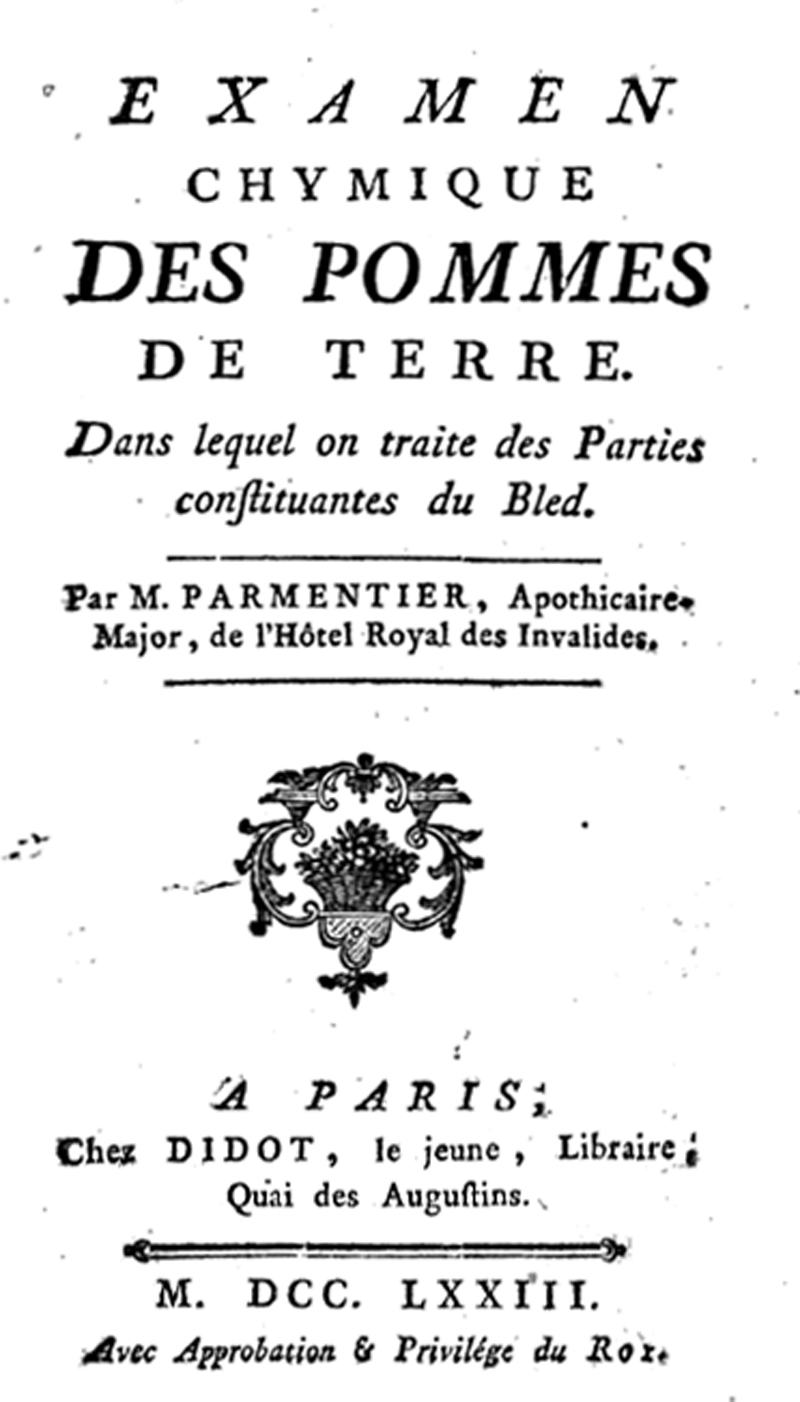
An examen chimique du pommes de terre ("A chemistry exam of the potatoes") by Antoine-Augustin Parmentier promoted the introduction of potatoes to France.

- 18th century: Soufflé appears in France. Cakes and pastries also begin to appear, thanks to the increasing availability of sugar and the rising of the chef profession.
- 18th century: Pizza begins to appear in Naples.
- Early 1700s: Introduction of potatoes in Russia.
- ~1700: Sparkling beer as we know it appears, due to maturation in bottles becoming available.
- 1719: Potatoes first introduced in North America: Scottish-Irish settlers bring them to New Hampshire.
- 1727: The Compleat Housewife, an English cookery book written by Eliza Smith is published in London
- 1740: The harsh winter of 1740 damages many crops but not potatoes, hastening their adoption in the Netherlands.
- 1747: The Art of Cookery Made Plain and Easy, an English cookbook is published by Hannah Glasse
- 1760: Egg nog was invented in North Carolina and was a common alcoholic beverage.
- 1765: The sandwich earns its name from English aristocrat John Montagu, 4th Earl of Sandwich, who preferred to eat sandwiches so he could play cards without soiling his fingers.
- 1767: Soda Water was invented in Leeds, England.
- 1770: Potato introduced in Australasia by Captain James Cook.
- 1772: Antoine-Augustin Parmentier writes the treaty Examen chymique des pommes de terres, promoting the introduction of potato in France.
- 1772: Tinned salmon. The Dutch Navy are recorded as carrying brine cooked, cleaned salmon, in tin plated iron cans.
- 1774-1779: First shops selling ice cream appear in North America.
- 1778: Guinness beer. Arthur Guinness begins making dark porter beers (although he had begun brewing ales in Dublin in 1759, which is the founding date featured on Guinness products).
- 1764: Baker's Chocolate Company origins. John Hannon and physician Dr. James Baker start importing cocoa beans and producing chocolate in Dorchester, Massachusetts. Originally "Hannon’s Best Chocolate", James Baker bought the company in 1780, naming it Baker's Chocolate Company
- 1778: Captain James Cook introduces watermelons to the Hawaii islands.
- 1790: King Arthur Baking Company origins. Originally founded in Boston, Massachusetts, by Henry Wood, an importer and distributor of English-milled flour. King Arthur-brand flour was introduced by the company in 1896.
- 1794: Potatoes are finally firmly part of the Dutch cuisine.

== 19th century ==
Date		Category	Origin
1800s	New potato varieties are brought from Chile to Europe, in an attempt to widen disease resistance of European potatoes. The import could have instead introduced or heightened vulnerability to the fungus Phytophthora infestans.	Vegetables	Chile
1801	Bent's water crackers produced by G. H. Bent Company, one of the earliest branded foods.	Grains	USA
1802	First modern production process for dried milk was invented by the Russian physician Osip Krichevsky in 1802. The first commercial production of dried milk was organized by the Russian chemist M. Dirchoff in 1832. In 1855, T.S. Grimwade took a patent on a dried milk procedure, though a William Newton had patented a vacuum drying process as early as 1837.	Dairy	Russia
1804	San-J (San-Jirushi) soy sauce company founded in Mie, Japan by the Sato family.	Condiments	Japan
1809	Gyuhap chongseo ("Women's Encyclopedia"), including many recipes, published in Korea	Cookbooks	Korea
1809	Airtight food preservation (canning) is improved by Nicolas Appert	Technology	France
1816	Menier Chocolate company (Chocolat Menier) founded by Antoine Brutus Menier as a pharmaceutical manufacturer in Paris, at a time when chocolate was used as a medicinal product	Confections	France
1824	The Virginia House-Wife cookbook published. Includes recipe for "Mary Randolph's Transparent Pudding," an early version of chess pie	Cookbook	USA
1829	Yuengling, America's oldest operating brewery, founded by German immigrant, D.G. Yuengling, in Pottsville, Pennsylvania, initially brewing Lord Chesterfield Ale and Dark Brewed Porter.	Alcoholic beverages	USA, Pennsylvania
1835	Baking powder is invented by food manufacturer, Alfred Bird.	Technology	England
1837	Soufflé potatoes invented by accident.	Vegetables	France
1837	Bird's Custard invented by Alfred Bird	Confections	England
1838	Knorr international brand of packaged foods founded by Carl Heinrich Theodor Knorr in Germany, who pioneered methods of drying seasonings and vegetables	General	Germany
1839	Alto Grande (Hacienda Alto Grande) began producing coffee in Lares, Puerto Rico. The brand later expanded to producing rum.	Beverages	Puerto Rico
1841	Edmond Albius, a 12-year-old slave who lived on the French island of Réunion in the Indian Ocean, discovered that vanilla could be hand-pollinated. Hand-pollination allowed global cultivation of the plant.	Technology	Réunion
1843	Hand cranked freezer invented by Nancy M. Johnson, credited for the fast diffusion of ice cream.	Technology	USA
1845	Potato blight infection (1845-1852) leads to famine in Ireland, killing or forcing the emigration of 1.5 million Irish people.	Vegetables	Ireland
1845	Lindt chocolate company founded (date provided by the Lindt & Sprüngli company). David Sprüngli founded his chocolate company in 1836, moved it in 1845, and bought out Lindt's chocolate company (which Rodolphe Lindt had founded in 1879).	Confections	Switzerland
1847	One of America's first candy-making machines invented in Boston by English-born pharmacist, Oliver Chase, to make "Chase Lozenges," the precursor to Necco Wafers	Confections	USA, Massachusetts
1847	The Carolina Housewife cookbook published, including one of the earliest recipes for peanut brittle, referred to as "groundnut candy" (the term "peanut brittle" was not used until 1892).	Cookbooks, Confections	USA
1848	One of the earliest recipes for butterscotch, in the Liverpool Mercury	Confections	England
1848	First commercially produced chewing gum, State of Maine Pure Spruce Gum, introduced by John Curtis.	Chewing gum	USA
1850	First flavored paraffin chewing gum created by John Curtis.	Chewing gum	USA
1852	Mayer Brothers apple cider mill founded in West Seneca, NY by Jacob Mayer and remains one of the oldest family-owned businesses in the state.	Beverages	USA, New York
1859	El Cocinero Puerto-Riqueño o Formulario, Puerto Rico's first cookbook, including earliest written recipes for mofongo.	Cookbooks	Puerto Rico
1859	Cook's California Champagne. Isaac Cook created the first American champagne.	Alcoholic beverages	USA
1860s	Earliest known fish and chips shops opened in London by Eastern European Jewish immigrant Joseph Malin, and by John Lees in Mossley, Lancashire.	Seafood	England
1860	Ronrico brand rum origin date as promoted on their product.	Alcoholic beverages	Puerto Rico
1860	Upper Silesia Brewery founded in Zabrze	Alcoholic beverages	Poland
1860	Tauras (formerly Vilniaus Tauras) brewery founded in Vilnius	Alcoholic beverages	Lithuania
1861	Popcorn balls, one of the most popular confections in the late nineteenth and early twentieth centuries, recipe first appears in the Housekeeper's Encyclopedia by New York author E. F. Haskell, instructing to "boil honey, maple, or other sugar to the great thread; pop corn and stick the corn together in balls with the candy."	Confections	USA, New York
1861	Black velvet cocktail invented to mourn the death of Prince Albert.	Alcoholic beverages	England
1861	Mrs. Beeton's Book of Household Management published in Britain, edited by Isabella Beeton.	Cookbooks	England
1862	President Lincoln establishes the Department of Agriculture, including the Bureau of Chemistry, which is the predecessor of the Food and Drug Administration (FDA).	Food safety	USA, Washington, D.C.
1862	Gulden's mustard company founded by Charles Gulden in New York City, producing a spicy brown mustard from a secret recipe, although the original recipe was spicier than the currently available product.	Sauces	USA, New York
1862	Rhum Barbancourt producer, Société du Rhum Barbancourt, is founded in Haiti, making rum from pure sugar cane juice.	Alcoholic beverages	Haiti
1862	Café du Monde, famous for their beignets and café au lait with chicory, opens as a coffee stand in the French Quarter of New Orleans, Louisiana.	Pastries	USA, Louisiana
1862	Perrier mineral water traces its origin to 1862, the year Napoleon III authorizing the use of Les Bouillens springs in Vergèze, and the water was first sold in Britain. However, the springs have been in use since antiquity, and Dr. Louis Perrier became the official medical director for the spring in 1898 and started the Perrier brand in 1903.	Beverages	France
1863	Coca wine, said to be a precursor of Coca-Cola, invented by French-Corsican chemist Angelo Mariani. The coca-based liqueur, Agwa de Bolivia, apparently debuting in the 2000s, is made by an Amsterdam-based company that promotes 1863 as their founding date.	Alcoholic beverages	France, Netherlands
1863	Fruit salad. One of the first recipes for fruit salad appeared in What to Cook and How to Eat It by Peirre Blot in New York.	Fruits	USA, New York
1863	Confederate Receipt Book published in Richmond VA	Cookbooks	USA, Virginia
1863	Granula, the first manufactured breakfast cereal and precursor to Grape Nuts is invented by James Caleb Jackson. The heavy bran nuggets needed soaking overnight before consuming.	Grains	USA, New York
1863	London Dry Gin, a dryer version than the typical Old Tom gin of the time, created by James Burrough in Chelsea, forefather of the Hayman family. Considered the origin of Hayman's of London distillery.	Alooholic beverages	England
1865	Hacienda Mercedita, under Juan Serrallés, begins producing rum. Their Don Q rum brand was launched in 1932.	Alcoholic beverages	Puerto Rico
1866	Vernor’s Ginger Ale introduced	Carbonated beverages	USA
1867	Hot dog invented by Charles Feltman for his food stall in Coney Island by pairing a frankfurter with a bread bun.	Meat	USA, New York
1867	Ambrosia fruit salad recipe debuts in Dixie Cookery cookbook by Maria Massey Barringer.	Fruits	USA
1868	Tabasco sauce invented by Edmund McIlhenny in Louisiana; first sold the following year and patented in 1870.	Sauces	USA, Louisiana
1869	Thomas Adams buys chicle, the milky latex of the sapodilla tree, from exiled Mexican President, Antonio López de Santa Anna, in the hopes of processing it for use as an alternative to rubber, but later sold it for its original purpose as chewing gum	Chewing gum	Mexico
1869	Thomas Adams markets “New York Chewing Gum”	Chewing gum	USA, New York
1869	Hippolyte Mège-Mouriès invents margarine, winning the prize offered by Napoleon III to invent a suitable substitute for butter. The original substitute however used beef suet rather than vegetable oils.	Fats and oils	France
1870	Beginning of international banana trade when American ship's captain Lorenzo Dow Baker purchased 160 bunches of bananas in Jamaica and resold them in Jersey City eleven days later. Baker went on to co-found the Boston Fruit Company in 1878, the precursor to the Chiquita brand, which debuted in 1944.	Fruits	USA
1871	Beef Stroganov recipe first appears as "Beef à la Stroganov, with mustard" in the 1871 edition of A Gift to Young Housewives (Russian: Подарок молодым хозяйкам) by Elena Molokhovets in Moscow. The recipe has changed over time.	Meat	Russia
1871	Thomas Adams patents first chewing gum-making machine and begins producing chicle-based gum as a novelty item with no flavorings or additives.	Chewing gum	USA
1873	Malted milk invented and marketed in England by James Horlick, and in 1873 started the J & W Horlicks company with his brother in Chicago. The first US patent for malted milk mixing powder was granted them in 1883.	Beverages	England
1875	Milk chocolate in solid form invented by Swiss chocolatier Daniel Peter (initially meant for making a drink). Peter also created the first milk chocolate for eating, Gala Peter, in 1887.	Confections	Switzerland
1879	William White discovers how to flavor chicle, using peppermint, and marketing it as Yucatan chewing gum	Chewing gum	USA
1879	Wheatena first advertised by George H. Hoyt	Grains	USA
1882	Tom Collins cocktail recipe, with Old Tom gin, lime or lemon, and soda water, first published in Harry Johnson's New and Improved Bartender’s Manual, or How to Mix Drinks of the Present Style, in English and German.	Alcoholic beverages	USA
1884	Thomas Adams begins adding licorice flavoring to his chicle gum, marketed as Adams Black Jack.	Chewing gum	USA
1885	Salisbury steak; an early description of its preparation.	Meat	USA
1885	1885-1904: Depending on claims, range for the invention of the modern hamburger sandwich.	Meat	USA
1886	Jonathan Primely makes the first fruit-flavored chewing gum, sold as Kis-Me	Chewing gum	USA
1886	Canada bans margarine	Fats and oils	Canada
1888	Brugal rum company founded by Spanish-Dominican, Andrés Brugal Montaner	Alcoholic beverages	Dominican Republic
1888	Thomas Adams' “Tutti Frutti” becomes first chewing gum sold in vending machines, which were placed in NYC subway stations.	Chewing gum	USA, New York
1890	Beeman's gum invented (elsewhere reported as 1882)	Chewing gum	USA
1890	Henry Fleer purportedly invents Chiclets, the first commercially available candy-coated chewing gum	Chewing gum	USA
1891	William Wrigley Jr. introduces the Vassar, Lotta, and Sweet 16 chewing gum brands.	Chewing gum	USA
1892	William Wrigley Jr. introduces Spearmint Pepsin gum	Chewing gum	USA
1892	Experimental plantations of rice in Australia begin, in New South Wales.	Grains	Australia
1892	Del Monte brand begins selling canned peaches. Although the company had been selling coffee under the Del Monte name (named for the Del Monte hotel in Monterey, California), the company began selling canned fruit in 1892, which is the founding date promoted by the company. The shield logo was adopted in 1909.	Fruits and vegetables	USA, California
1893	Cream of Wheat introduced by Scottish-born chief miller, Tom Amidon	Grains	USA
1893	Juicy Fruit gum introduced	Chewing gum	USA
1894	Granulated gelatin first commercially available, invented by the Knox Company, followed by Jell-O a few years later.	Confections	USA
1894	Walker's Nonsuch toffee manufacturer founded	Confections	England
1895	Postum coffee substitute beverage made from roasted wheat bran and molasses invented by C. W. Post. The "instant" drink mix version was developed in 1912.	Beverages	USA
1896	Yaucono coffee company established in Puerto Rico	Beverages	Puerto Rico
1896	Waldorf salad containing only apples, celery, and mayonnaise created for a charity ball for the St. Mary's Hospital for Children at the Waldorf-Astoria hotel in New York City on 13 March.	Fruit salads	USA, New York
1896	First self-service restaurant (the "Stollwerck-Automatenrestaurant") opens in Berlin's Leipziger Straße.	Fast food	Germany
1897	Cotton candy-spinning machine invented by dentist William Morrison and confectioner John C. Wharton, and first introduced to a wide audience at the 1904 World's Fair as Fairy Floss	Confections	USA
1897	Gallo (Famosa) Guatemalan beer introduced	Alcoholic beverages	Guatemala
1897	Grape Nuts introduced	Grains	USA
1897	Al Ahram brewery founded	Alcoholic beverages	Egypt
1897	Dos Equis first brewed by the German-Mexican Wilhelm Hasse	Alcoholic beverages	Mexico
1897	Crème caramel in its modern form, with soft caramel on top, and prepared and cooked using a bain-marie, is first documented in La cuisinière provençale by Jean Baptiste Reboul.	Desserts	France
1898	Brunswick stew introduced	Soups and stews	USA
1898	Walkers Shortbread introduced	Breads	Scotland
1898	Tarte Tatin introduced	Confections	France
1898	Lane cake introduced	Confections	USA
1898	Barq's Root Beer introduced	Beverages	USA
1898	Jelly beans; first known reference in writing.	Confections	USA
1898	Gin sour introduced	Alcoholic beverages	USA
1898	Pepsi Cola introduced	Beverages	USA
1898	Perrier mineral water	Beverages	France
1899	Dentyne gum created by New York druggist, Franklin V. Canning	Chewing gum	USA
1899	Licorice Allsorts introduced	Confections	England
1899	Oysters Rockefeller introduced	Seafood	USA, Louisiana
1899	Club sandwich introduced	Sandwiches	USA, New York
1899	Maltex hot cereal introduced	Grains	USA
1899	Dentyne gum introduced	Confections	USA
1899	American Chicle Company founded	Chewing gum	USA

== 20th century ==
Date		Category	Origin
1900	Clark's Teaberry chewing gum invented by Charles Burke	Chewing gum	USA
1902	Barnum's Animal Crackers introduced by Nabisco, sold in a little box with a string to be hung as a Christmas tree ornament.	Confections	USA, New York
1904	Ovomaltine (later known as Ovaltine), originally consisting of malt, milk, eggs, and cocoa invented by Swiss chemist, Albert Wander.	Beverages	Switzerland
1904	Jello salad. One of the earliest examples of jello salad is Perfection Salad, developed by Mrs. John E. Cook of New Castle, Pennsylvania in 1904.	Fruit salads	USA, Pennsylvania
1905	Lactobacillus bulgaricus, the lactic acid-producing bacteria, discovered by Stamen Grigorov as the true cause for the existence of natural yogurt.	Dairy	Bulgaria
1907	Gumballs and gumball machines introduced.	Chewing gum	USA
1908	Hydrox sandwich cookie introduced by Sunshine Biscuits.	Confections	USA
1908	Tootsie Roll chocolate taffy, invented by Leo Hirschfield, is first sold by the Stern & Saalberg company	Confections	USA, New York
1911	Orange Crush invented	Beverages	USA
1912	Oreo sandwich cookie, an imitation of the Hydrox cookie, introduced by Nabisco in the Chelsea Market, Manhattan. Double Stuf Oreo was introduced in 1974, Halloween Oreo in 1991, Oreo Mini in 1992, Golden Oreo in 2011, and Oreo Thins in 2015.	Confections	USA, New York
1912	Bread-slicing machine invented by Otto Rohwedder, although it would not enter use before 1928 however.	Technology	USA
1912	Blueberries, domesticated, first reach the market.	Fruits	USA
1913	Violet Crumble chocolate bar introduced by Hoadley's Chocolates in South Melbourne	Confections	Australia
1914	Doublemint gum introduced by Wrigley	Chewing gum	USA
1914	Thomas Adams introduces Clove brand gum	Chewing gum	USA
1915	El Presidente cocktail, earliest claimed origin date, although there are multiple claims as to the invention of the cocktail.	Alcoholic beverages	Cuba
1918	Fox's Glacier Mints introduced as "Acme Clear Mint Fingers" by Eric Fox, later named Fox's Glacier Mints in 1919	Confections	England
1919	Campbell Cereal Company founded, producing Malt-O-Meal, a combination of farina wheat and malted barley, as an alternative to Cream of Wheat (1893).	Companies	USA
1920	Flake chocolate bar introduced by Cadbury	Confections	England
1922	Minties candy invented by James Noble Stedman	Confections	Australia
1928	One of the earliest references to lucky tattie candy, in the Dundee Evening Telegraph	Confections	Scotland
1924	Botan Rice Candy invented by Seika Foods	Confections	Japan
1924	Red River Cereal introduced by the Red River Grain Co.	Grains	Canada
1925	McVitie's chocolate digestive biscuit introduced	Confections	England
1925	Mr. Goodbar candy bar with peanuts and chocolate introduced by The Hershey Company.	Confections	USA
1927	Wrigley introduces PK Gum (discontinued in 1975)	Chewing gum	USA
1928	Heath chocolate toffee bar introduced by the Heath Brothers Confectionery	Confections	USA
1928	Walter Diemer, working for the Fleer Chewing Gum Company in Philadelphia, invents Dubble Bubble, the first bubble gum	Chewing gum	USA, Pennsylvania
1929	Crunchie chocolate-covered honeycomb toffee candy bar introduced by J. S. Fry & Sons	Confections	England
1930s	Gum trading cards introduced	Chewing gum	USA
1930	Fruit cocktail first sold commercially, first by Barron–Gray, then California Packing Corporation under its Del Monte brand a few years later.	Fruit salads	USA, California
1931	Tootsie Pop invented by an employee of The Sweets Company of America (later Tootsie Roll Industries)	Confections	USA
1933	Peter Paul Co. sells a charcoal gum, advertising on Mounds box	Chewing gum	USA
1934	Farex baby cereal first produced by the company Glaxo.	Grains	USA
1934	Milo chocolate-flavoured malted powder invented by Australian chemist Thomas Mayne	Beverages	Australia
1935	Presidente beer introduced in 1935 in the Dominican Republic in honor of then-president Rafael Leónidas Trujillo. Originally a dark beer, it was remade into a pilsner in the 1960s.	Alcoholic beverages	Dominican Republic
1935	Green papaya salad. One of the earliest known recipe of som tam in Thailand appeared in the Yaowapha cookbook series by Princess Yaovabha Bongsanid in 1935, which included Som tam ton malako (Thai: ส้มตำต้นมะละกอ) or Khao man som tam (Thai: ข้าวมันส้มตำ). This recipe is similar to som tam as prepared today and includes roasted peanuts and dried shrimp as key ingredients.	Vegetables	Thailand
1936	Quality Street first produced by Mackintosh's	Confections	England
1937	Maltesers first sold in the UK	Confections	England
1939	Malta India carbonated malt beverage introduced	Beverages	Puerto Rico
1940	The McDonalds brothers open their first McDonald's restaurant on 15 May in San Bernardino, California	Fast food	USA, California
1943	Akta-Vite chocolate flavouring for milk invented by George Nicholas near Melbourne	Beverages	Australia
1943	White Rabbit Creamy Candy introduced	Confections	China
1947	Bazooka Bubble Gum introduced	Chewing gum	USA
1948	Nestlé Quik drink mix for chocolate-flavored milk launched (became Nesquik in 1999)	Beverages	USA
1948	Polo breath mint introduced by Rowntree's Factory, York	Confections	England
1948	Canada lifts the ban on margarine.	Fats and oils	Canada
1950	Harvey’s Sugarless Gum introduced	Chewing gum	USA
1951	Maypo introduced by the Maltex Corporation	Grains	USA
1953	First commercial fish fingers. The American company Gorton-Pew Fisheries, now known as Gorton's, was the first company to introduce a frozen ready-to-cook fish finger; the product, named Gorton's Fish Sticks, won the Parents magazine Seal of Approval in 1956. The developer of those fish sticks was Aaron L. Brody.	Seafood	USA
1953	Piña colada. 1953 or 1954 are both claimed dates of invention at the Caribe Hilton Hotel in Puerto Rico, as well as 1963 at the Barrachina restaurant.	Alcoholic beverages	Puerto Rico
1958	The instant noodle was invented by Momofuku Ando of Nissin Foods in Japan, and launched the same year.	Grains	Japan
1958	The first conveyor belt sushi restaurant, Mawaru Genroku Sushi, opens in Higashiosaka.	Fast food	Japan
1953	Daim chocolate caramel almond bar introduced	Confections	Sweden
1958	Nestle Nestum introduced	Grains	Portugal
1959	Caramac caramel bar introduced by Mackintosh's	Confections	England
1960s	Dalgona candy becomes a popular street food in Korea	Confections	South Korea
1960	The invention of the potato water gun knife facilitates the mass production of French fries by fast food restaurants.	Technology	USA
1961	Invention of the Chorleywood bread process.	Grains	England
1964	Toffo toffee (originally named Toff-O-Lux until 1975) introduced by Mackintosh’s	Confections	England
1964	The iconic Australian biscuit Tim Tam enters the market.	Confections	Australia
1976	Pop Rocks fizzing candy introduced by General Foods (although it had been invented and patented earlier, in 1961)	Confections	USA
1980	Medalla Light beer introduced to commemorate the 1979 Pan American Games in Puerto Rico.	Alcoholic beverages	Puerto Rico
1981	Skor chocolate toffee bar introduced by The Hershey Company	Confections	USA
1983	Fruit Roll-Ups introduced	Confections	USA
1990s	Goldschläger, a gold-infused cinnamon schnapps based on goldwasser, the Polish liqueur from 1606 is introduced. It becomes a popular drink in the 1990s for shots.	Alcoholic beverages	Switzerland
1995	McFlurry soft serve dessert introduced by McDonald's	Fast Food	USA

== 21st century ==
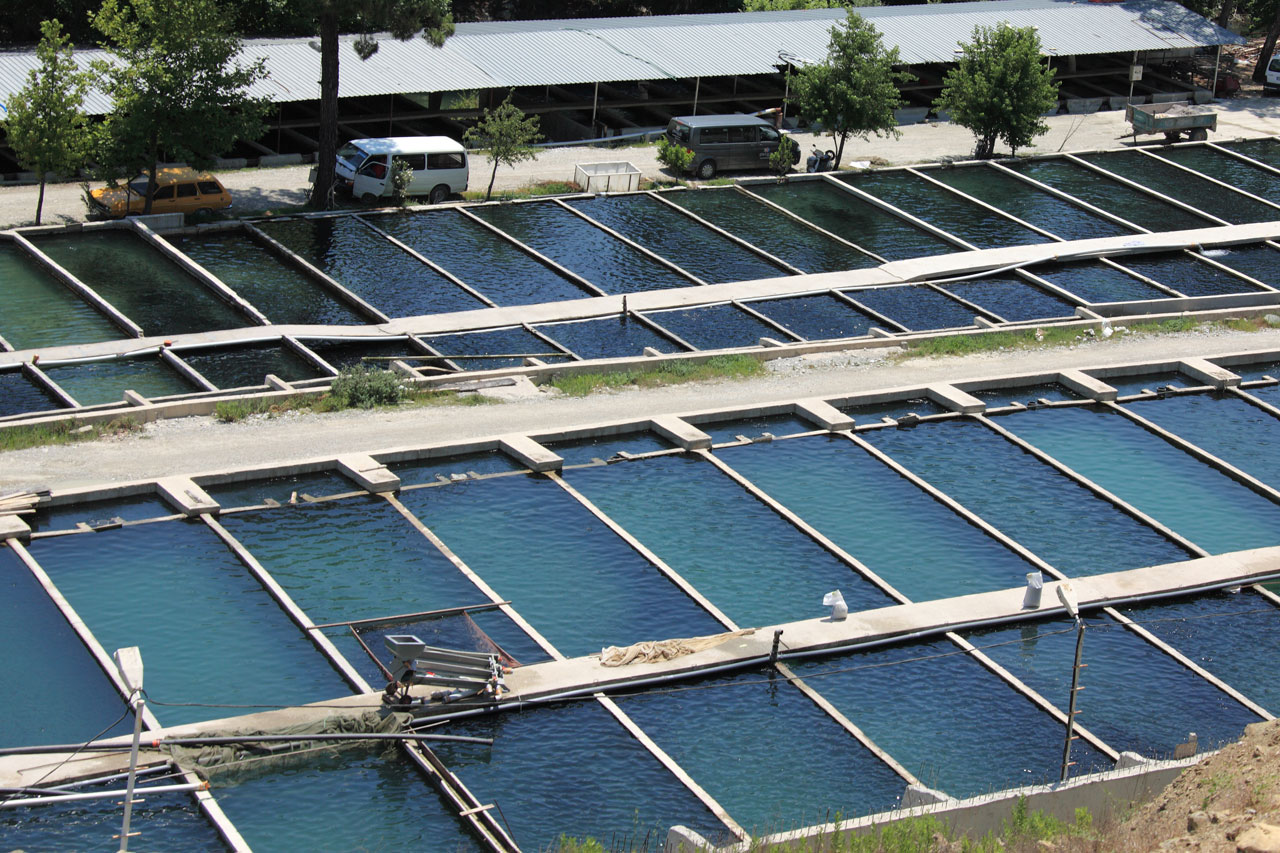
Modern aquaculture

- 2003: The Dutch Kapsalon and the Indonesian Ayam Geprek are both culinary product invented in 2003.
- 2013: Professor Mark Post at Maastricht University pioneered a proof-of-concept for cultured meat by creating the first hamburger patty grown directly from cells. Since then, other cultured meat prototypes have gained media attention: SuperMeat opened a farm-to-fork restaurant called "The Chicken"
- 2017: The art of making Neapolitan pizza was added to UNESCO's list of intangible cultural heritage.

== See also ==
- Timeline of culinary technologies
- Food history
- History of breakfast
- Lists
  - Ancient dishes
  - Historical cuisines
  - Post-classical dishes
  - Food and beverage museums
