= Certs =

Mint confectionery

- Product type: Breath mint
- Current owner: Reboot Brands (2025–present)
- Country: United States
- Introduced: 1956; 70 years ago
- Discontinued: 2018 (brought back in 2025)
- Previous owners: List: American Chicle Company (1956–1962); Warner–Lambert (1962–2000); Pfizer (2000–02); Cadbury Schweppes (2002–10); Kraft (2010–12); Mondelez (2012–18)
- Tagline: "Two Mints in One"; "The Right Amount of Mint"
- Website: certs.com

Certs is a brand of breath mint that is noted for the phrase "two mints in one" in its marketing. The original Certs were disc-shaped without a hole and sold in roll packaging similar to Life Savers and Polo.

Certs were one of the first mints to be nationally marketed in the United States and were a fixture at American drug stores and convenience stores from their debut on the market in 1956 until they were discontinued in 2018. Reboot Brands acquired the Certs brand in 2025 and relaunched it in partnership with Nature's Stance.

== History ==
Certs were developed by American Chicle and introduced into the North American market in 1956. The "Certs" name originated from its approval by Good Housekeeping (as in "certified by Good Housekeeping"), a magazine that, then as now, bestowed the Good Housekeeping Seal on products that pass its quality and reliability tests. In 1962, American Chicle was acquired by Warner-Lambert. Warner-Lambert placed its confectionery brands, which included Certs, Chiclets, Dentyne, Halls, and Trident, into its new Adams division (named after the founder of American Chicle). In 1988, sugar-free Certs Mini-Mints sweetened with Nutrasweet were introduced as a Tic Tac competitor. In 1997, Certs Cool Mint Drops were introduced in response to Altoids' rapid growth during the 1990s. Pfizer acquired Warner-Lambert in 2000. Citing confectionery as a "noncore" business, Pfizer sold its Adams portfolio to Cadbury for $4.2 billion in 2002, after Cadbury beat Nestlé in a bidding war. Mondelez International, then called Kraft Foods, made a hostile takeover of Cadbury in 2010 for $19.5 billion. The Certs name ceased to be mentioned by Mondelez as one of its brands in December 2013.

== Description ==
Certs were classified as mints, but they contained no oils of any mint plant. Instead, as has long been advertised, the mints contain "Retsyn", a trademarked name for a mixture of copper gluconate, partially hydrogenated cottonseed oil, and flavoring. It is the copper gluconate in Retsyn which gave Certs its signature green flecks.

Certs were originally shaped as simple circular tablets with beveled edges and "CERTS" embossed with the "C" enlarged and surrounding "ERTS". The shape later changed to have a toroidal bulge on each face without a hole; "CERTS" and "RETSYN" were debossed near the circumference.

== Variations ==
Certs Classic Mints are available in peppermint and spearmint.

Certs Mini-Mints, and later as Certs Powerful Mints, were small Tic-Tac-like mints available in peppermint, spearmint, and wintergreen.

Certs Cool Mint Drops, described as a "breath drop", were medium-sized oval-shaped mints. They came in flavors named "cinnamint", "freshmint", and peppermint, and fruit flavor.

== Advertising ==
In the 1960s and 1970s, Certs was heavily advertised on American television with a famous campaign featuring two attractive young people earnestly arguing over the proper classification of the mints. The one participant would assert, "It's a breath mint!" The other would assay a rebuttal by stating, "It’s a candy mint!" This taxonomic dilemma would finally be resolved by the unseen announcer, who would achieve synthesis by explaining that Certs was "Two, two, two mints in one!" Saturday Night Live lampooned the ads with a fictitious product called "Shimmer", with Gilda Radner's argument "It's a floor wax!" vs. Dan Aykroyd's "It's a dessert topping, you cow!" being resolved by announcer Chevy Chase's declaration that "New Shimmer's a floor wax and a dessert topping!". Indeed, the phrase "Two, two, two [insert almost any word or short phrase here] in one" remained an American idiomatic expression into the 21st century.

== Litigation ==
In 1999, the United States Customs Service classified Certs as a candy mint for tariff purposes; candy was taxed differently from oral hygiene products. In the ensuing suit before the United States Court of International Trade, Cadbury introduced expert testimony that Certs stimulate the flow of saliva, thus flushing bad odors from the mouth, and that its flavors and oils mask bad breath. But the court ruled that, since Certs did not contain antibacterial ingredients, they were, indeed, simply a candy mint. This ruling was, however, overturned at the Court of Appeals for the Federal Circuit, making Certs legally a breath mint.

== See also ==
- List of breath mints
