= Beemans gum =

Chewing gum

Beemans

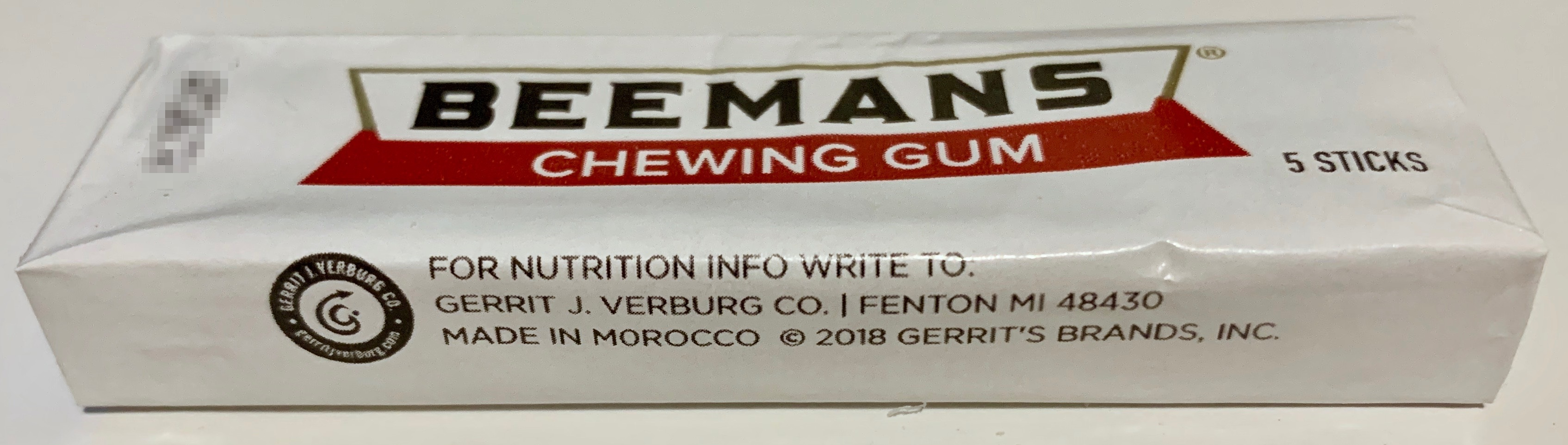
- Beemans pack commercialised in 2019
- Product type: Chewing gum
- Current owner: Gerrit J. Verburg Co. (2018present)
- Country: United States
- Introduced: 1890; 136 years ago
- Previous owners: List: American Chicle Company (1890–1962); Warner–Lambert (1962–2000); Pfizer (2000–02); Cadbury Schweppes (2002–10); Kraft (2010–12); Mondelez (2012–18)

Beemans gum (originally Beeman's Gum) is a chewing gum formulated by Ohio physician Edward E. Beeman and first sold in February 1890. It originally contained pepsin, but no longer does. Beemans became popular with early aviators as a good luck charm, and Chuck Yeager is purported to have chewed a stick of Beemans gum before every flight.

== History ==
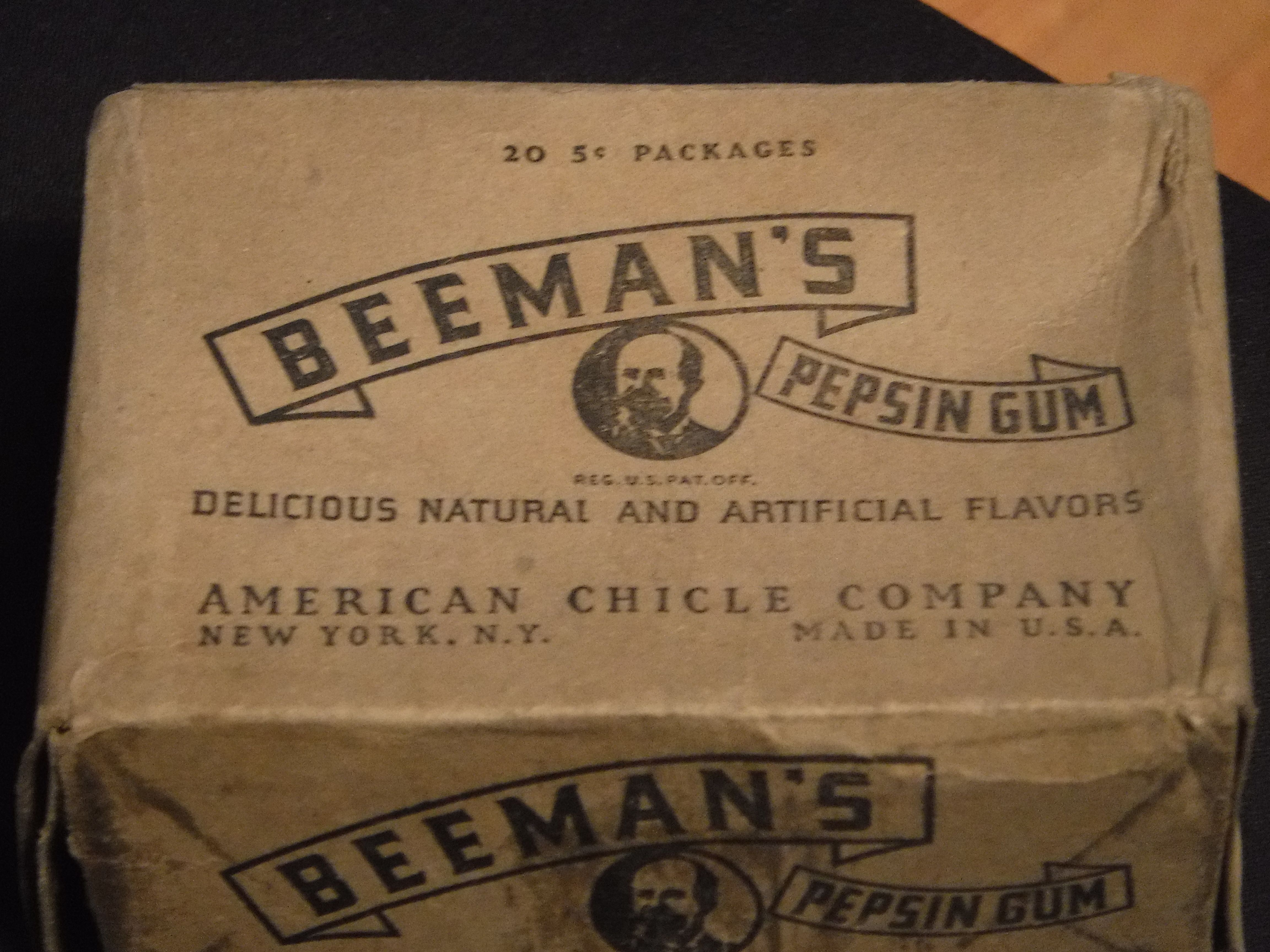
Wrapping for 20 packages of Beeman's Pepsin Gum, from the American Chicle Company

Beeman originally claimed the gum contained pepsin powder that would improve digestion. The product became a part of the American Chicle Company in 1898, and continued on after the purchase of American Chicle by Warner-Lambert in 1962. Production ceased in 1978 due to lagging sales. In 1985, the brand was revived in a nostalgia campaign, as an ordinary chewing gum without the medical claims, marketed along with Clove and Black Jack chewing gums.

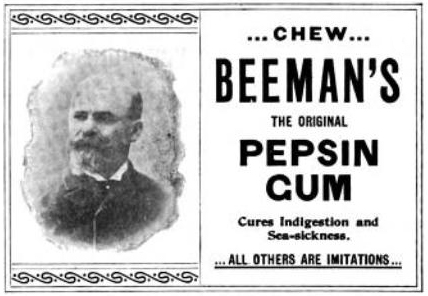
Beeman's Pepsin Gum ad of 1897

The original wrapper had a pig logo, but was later replaced with a logo featuring Beeman's name in scroll and his portrait. The modern wrapper design has a white and red background with white and black lettering. Beemans is sporadically produced by Cadbury Adams as a nostalgia gum, along with the other historic gums Clove and Black Jack. In 2015, the company announced it would no longer produce any of these popular gums. Since then, because of regular demand, all three brands have been reintroduced.

In 2019, Gerrit J. Verburg, one of America's largest candy importers, purchased the exclusive rights and resumed production. The gum is no longer made in the United States but rather in Morocco. Packaging is similar to the "original" as is the formula. The gum is sold sporadically in the United States by the Gerrit J. Verburg Co.

== Medical claims ==
The "lucky" gum of pilots is a superstition perhaps based in the original product's unsubstantiated claim of preventing seasickness, but applied to flight airsickness. Chewing any type of gum is thought to promote equalizing pressure in the ears.

The product no longer contains any pepsin or chicle, and instead follows the ordinary modern chewing gum recipe of sweetened and flavored synthetic gum base. The original medical claim that the chewing gum "cures indigestion and sea-sickness" was never substantiated and is not permitted by food and drug regulations dating to the 1930s.

== In popular culture ==
The gum is prominently featured in major movies The Right Stuff (1983), Hot Shots! (1991), The Rocketeer (1991) (in which the gum serves a key plot element), and Indiana Jones and the Kingdom of the Crystal Skull (2008), used by the character Mutt Williams (Shia LaBeouf). More recently, the gum appears on the workbench of young Frank Walker in Disney's Tomorrowland (2015), as the inventor works on his homemade jet-pack.

Beemans Gum is briefly mentioned in the Netflix series Monster: The Ed Gein Story (2025), when Ed Gein asks for some during an interrogation scene.
