= American Chicle Company Building =

- U.S. National Register of Historic Places
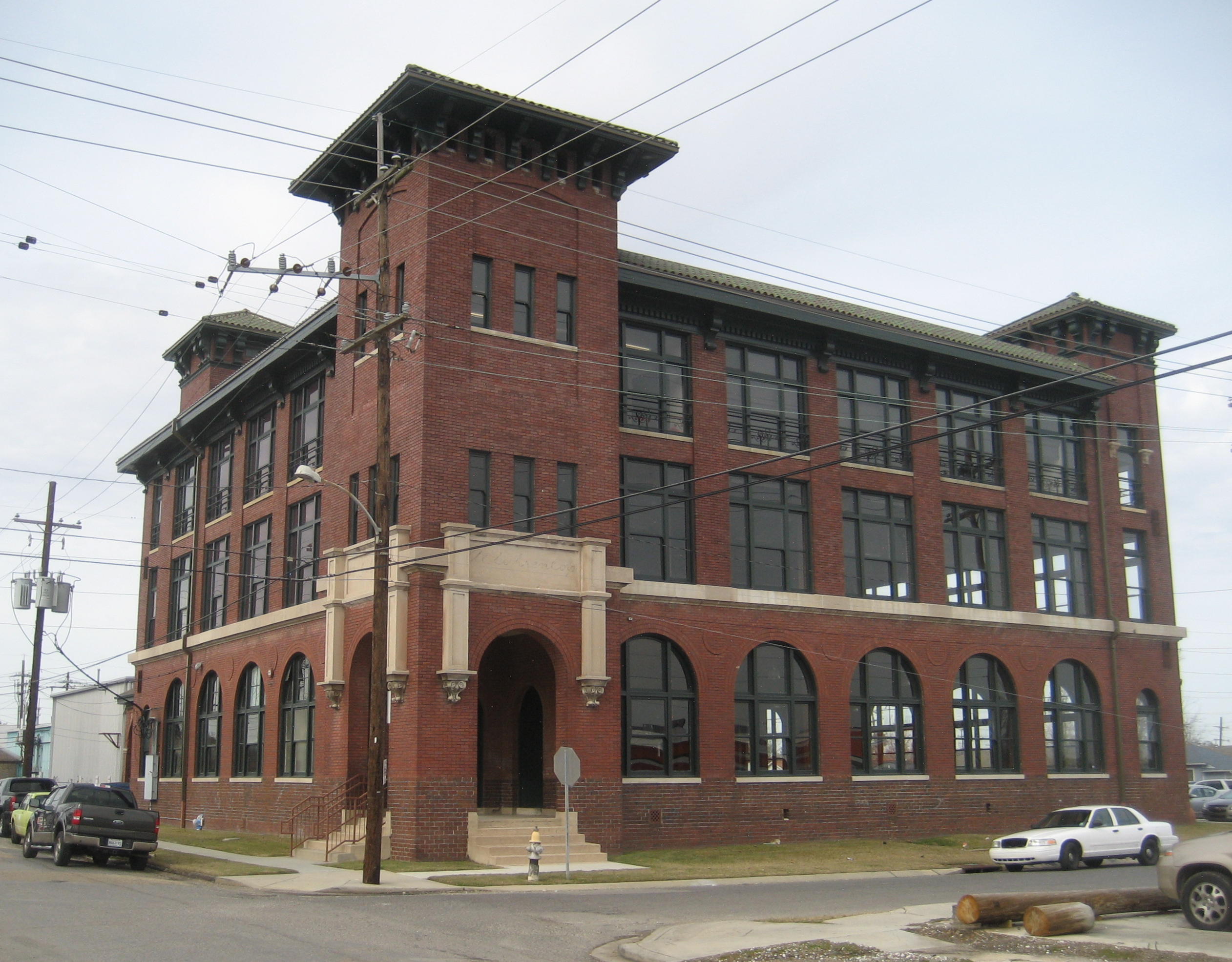
- Seen from Fig Street, 2010

- Location within East New Orleans Location within Louisiana Location within the United States
- Location: 8311 Fig St., New Orleans, Louisiana
- Coordinates: 29°57′43″N 90°7′3″W
- Area: less than one acre
- Built: 1911
- Architectural style: Italian Renaissance
- NRHP reference No.: 98001176
- Added to NRHP: September 18, 1998

The American Chicle Company Building, built in 1911, is located in the Gert Town neighborhood of New Orleans, Louisiana.

The New Orleans Chamber of Commerce started campaigning for a chewing gum factory in the city in 1900. Points in favor of New Orleans as a good location for such a factory included being USA's leading port of commerce with Latin America, so much chicle was already shipped through there, and large quantities of sugar are grown and refined in Louisiana.

The American Chicle Company built the building as a branch factory, which opened production in 1911.

After the gum factory closed, the building housed a box factory and an automotive parts warehouse.

It was added to the National Register of Historic Places in 1998.

The area flooded in the 2005 levee failure disaster during Hurricane Katrina. After remaining vacant for years, the building was refurbished as an office building in 2008–2009, and now houses the headquarters of Landis Construction Company.
