= Bubblicious =

Brand of bubble gum

- Product type: Bubble gum
- Current owner: Perfetti Van Melle (2023–pres.)
- Country: United States
- Introduced: 1977; 49 years ago
- Previous owners: List: Warner–Lambert (1977–2000); Pfizer (2000–02); Cadbury Schweppes (2002–10); Kraft (2010–12); Mondelez (2012–18)

Bubblicious is a brand of bubble gum owned by the Italian-Dutch company Perfetti Van Melle.

Originally produced by the American Chicle division of Warner-Lambert, the brand was launched in 1977 in response to the tremendous sales of Bubble Yum, the first soft bubble gum. The brand struggled upon introduction, but sales took off with the advent, in 1978, of the "Ultimate Bubble" advertising campaign. Bubblicious was later expanded internationally.

In 2025, Bubblicious was relaunched, bringing back the Original and Watermelon flavors with updated formulas and new packaging.

== Flavors ==
Bubblicious has been available in 28 flavors, including Bubblegum, Watermelon, Strawberry, Grape, Cotton Candy, Tropical Punch, Sour Citrus, Sour Apple, Blueberry, and Fruit Twist. Bubblicious is available in original format and Bubblicious Bursts with a liquid-filled center.

The original "Lightning Lemonade" flavor was discontinued in the year 2000. However, in 2005 the flavor was re-introduced as LeBron's Lightning Lemonade, based on a partnership between Bubblicious and basketball player LeBron James. The caricature featured on the packaging was illustrated by cartoonist Grey Blackwell. When the flavor was re-introduced, it was changed to include a raspberry flavor element.

"Bubblicious Ink'd!" was a sour flavor, the coloring of which caused the chewer's tongue to turn blue. The flavor was supported by Cartoon Network's Klik Street Skaters' Group, who performed a commercial similar to the company's original Ink'd! commercial.

In 2026, Bubblicious introduced "Gummy Gum", combining bubble gum with a soft and chewy gummy layer, available in Strawberry Orange and Watermelon Original flavors.

== Trivia ==
Bubblicious was involved in the Guinness World Records for the most bubble gum bubbles blown at one time. Hundreds of Little League players and fans joined Major League Baseball Hall of Famer Ozzie Smith to set the world record with over 100 fans and 300 pieces of Bubblicious gum.

In June 2013, former New England Patriots Tight End Aaron Hernandez was linked to a murder by his purchase of Blue Cotton Candy Bubblicious.
