= Chewels =

Defunct brand of chewing gum

- Product type: Chewing gum
- Current owner: (brand discontinued)
- Country: United States
- Introduced: 1977
- Related brands: Freshen Up
- Previous owners: Warner–Lambert (1977–92)

Chewels is a defunct brand of spearmint flavored chewing gum. It had a liquid center that oozed out when chewed. It was similar to Freshen Up.

== Advertising ==
A commercial for Chewels gum was one of the first advertisements aired on MTV. The commercial was later featured on MTV's website for their 25th anniversary, along with the first hour of programming when the network debuted. Chewels was also a regular sponsor of American Top 40 radio show.

Their first ad campaign had people switching from CareFree Sugarless Gum to Chewels with the simple explanation; "Chewels tastes better!" Their later jingle was: "Smack dab in the middle. Smack dab in the middle. Smack dab in the middle of the gum is the secret to Chewels' sugarless fun, a delicious center filling where others have none, smack dab in the middle of the gum."
