= American Chicle Company =

American chewing gum company

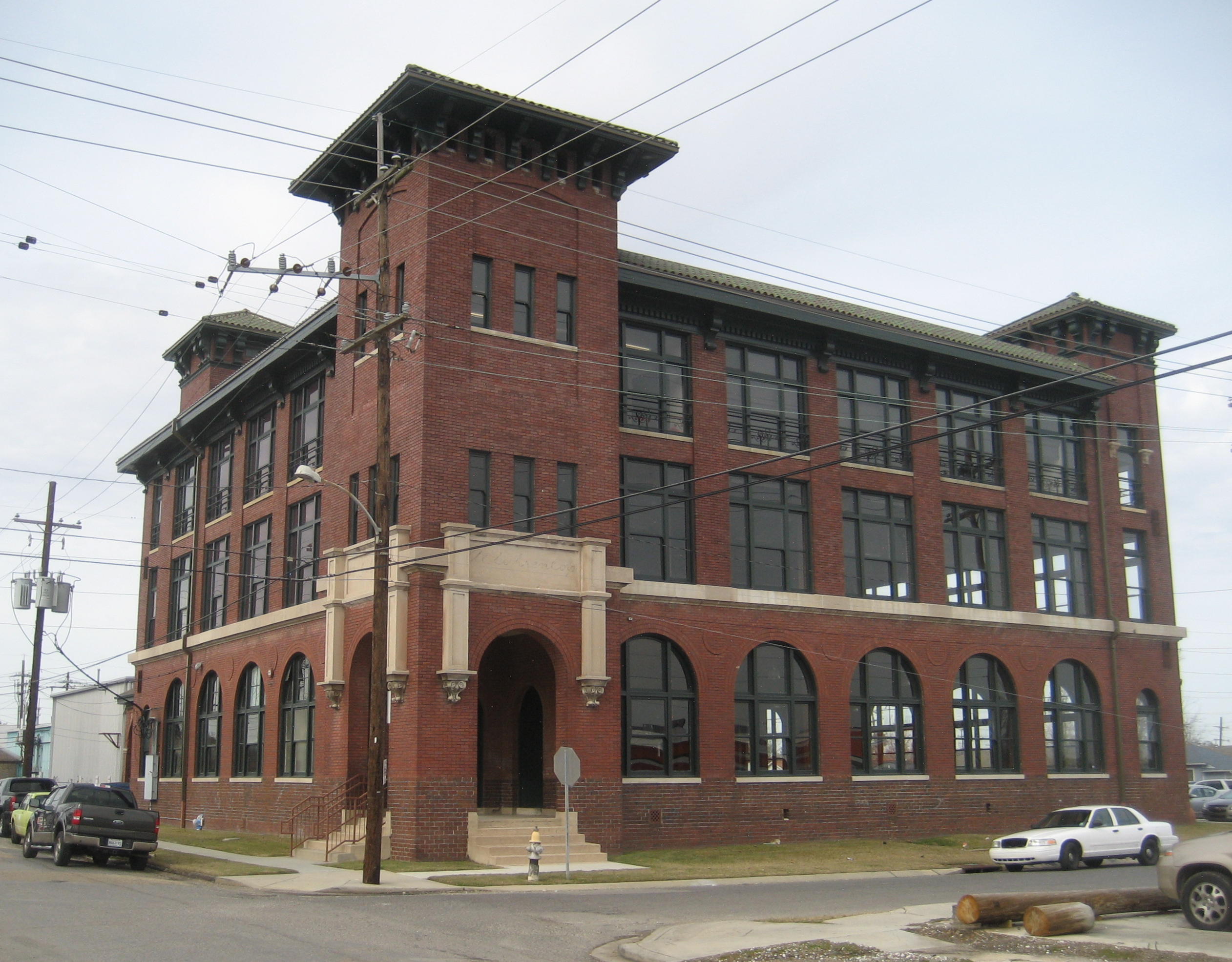
- Former company headquarters in New Orleans, photographed in 2010
- Type: Private (1899–1962); Subsidiary (1962–81)
- Industry: Confectionery
- Founded: 2 Jun 1899 in New Jersey
- Founder: Thomas Adams, Jr. Edward E. Beeman; Jonathan Primle
- Defunct: 1981; 45 years ago
- Fate: Defunct company; most of its brands are still in use
- Headquarters: New Orleans, U.S.
- Area served: Worldwide
- Products: Chewing gum
- Brands: List: Beemans; Black Jack; Bubblicious; Certs; Chewels; Chiclets; Clove; Clorets; Dentyne; Freshen Up; Trident
- Parent: Warner–Lambert (1962–81)

The American Chicle Company was a chewing gum trust founded by Thomas Adams, Jr., with Edward E. Beeman and Jonathan Primle.

The company was founded by Thomas Adams (May 4, 1818 – February 7, 1905), a 19th-century American scientist and inventor who is regarded as a founder of the chewing gum industry. Adams conceived the idea while working as a secretary to former Mexican leader Antonio López de Santa Anna, who chewed a natural gum called chicle. Adams first tried to formulate the gum into a rubber which was suitable for making tires. When that didn't work, he turned the chicle into a chewing gum called New York Chewing Gum. Adams created his first batch of flavorless chicle balls, named Adams New York Gum No. 1, in 1859, and they sold out quickly.

== History ==
=== American Chicle Company ===
Thomas Adams, founder of the company

Roots to the American Chicle Company can be traced to 1870, when Adams created the first flavored gum, black licorice, which he named Black Jack. He sold it from a warehouse on Front Street. In 1871, Adams patented the first chewing gum making machine. In 1888, his company opened a factory on Sands Street. His Tutti-Frutti gum was also one of the first to be sold in vending machines. Adams retired from the business in 1898 and his oldest son, Thomas Jr., took over. The wealth that Thomas Jr obtained from the company allowed him to build one of the fanciest mansions in Gilded Age New York.

The American Chicle Company was incorporated in Trenton, New Jersey, on June 2, 1899. Its market capitalization was $9,000,000 with one third issued as preferred stock and 6% with cumulative dividends. The business was a merger of the major chewing gum concerns at the time: Adams Sons & Company in Brooklyn; Beeman Chemical Company; W. J. White & Sons in Cleveland; J. P. Primley in Chicago; Kis-Me Gum Company Louisville, Kentucky; and S. T. Britten & Co. in Toronto. The corporation operated factories and gum forests in Yucatan. William J. White served as the company's first president and Thomas Adams Jr. Was the first chairman.

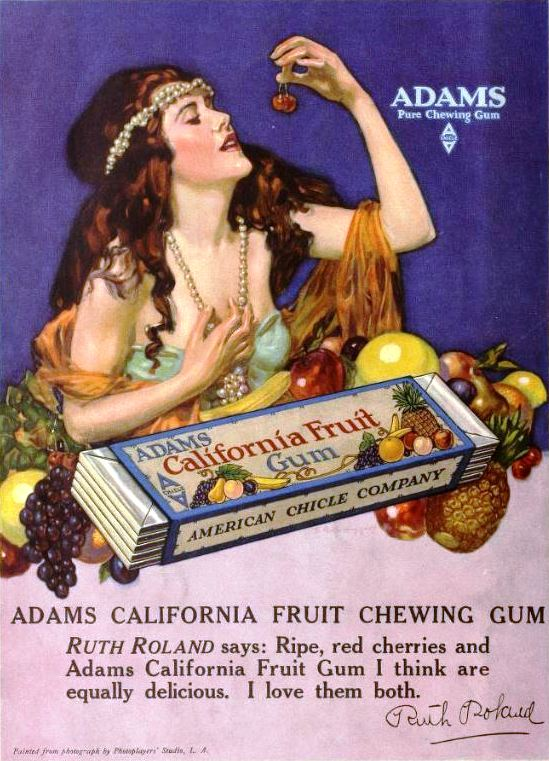
1919 advertisement of Adams California Fruit gum

In 1914, the company acquired Chiclets from the Fleer Chewing Gum Company of Philadelphia. It also acquired Dentyne in 1916. In 1919, American Chicle bought land at Degnon Terminal in Long Island City to build a new factory.

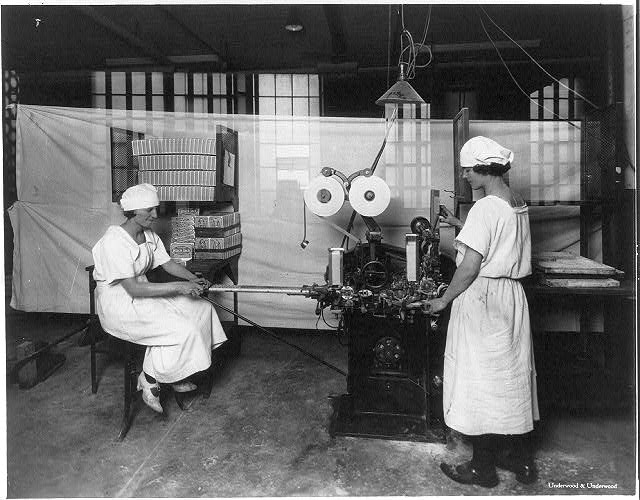
Two women operating gum-wrapping machine at the American Chicle Company Plant in Brooklyn, New York, 1923

On January 8, 1920, Don Ricardo Moreira, of San Salvador of the Coldwell & Moreira firm, registered American Chicle Co. trademarks in El Salvador. In 1923, the company moved into its new 550,000 square foot, $2 million factory and headquarters. The building could house over 500 employees and produced five million packages of chewing gum per day.

For decades, the building's Dentyne and Chiclet sign became a landmark for travelers entering Long Island. By 1935, American Chicle had 15% of the North American gum market, behind the William Wrigley Jr. Company and Beech-Nut Packing Company.

American Chicle utilized Dancer Fitzgerald Sample in 1950 to promote its products via radio, newspapers, and television.

=== American Chicle Group ===
American Chicle factory in Long Island, NY, 1976

American Chicle was acquired by the pharmaceutical company Warner-Lambert in 1962, with combined sales that year being estimated at around $300,000,000. During the 1970s, American Chicle discontinued Black Jack and Clove in order to focus resources to the sugarless Trident and liquid-filled Freshen-Up. Beemans was removed from the US market and remained available only in Canada.

In 1976, an explosion at the American Chicle Company factory killed six workers and injured more than 40. It remained closed for five weeks following the incident. In 1976, Bubblicious was released to compete against Bubble Yum.

The company's Long Island City factory was shut down at the end of 1981. Gum-making operations were moved to facilities in Anaheim, California and Rockford, Illinois. The Anaheim factory was closed in 1985 during a period of consolidation for the company. In the spring of 1986, American Chicle introduced Sticklets, a stick gum version of Chiclets. Later that year, the company brought Black Jack, Beemans, and Clove gum back into production. In 1988, Warner-Lambert acquired Junior Mints, Charleston Chew, Sugar Daddy, among other brands, from RJR Nabisco and integrated them into the American Chicle Group.

=== Adams ===
The American Chicle Company was renamed Adams in 1997. Warner-Lambert was acquired by Pfizer in 2000 for $90.2 billion. After a two-year ban on selling the company's gum assets, Cadbury Schweppes purchased Adams in 2002 for $4.9 billion. Kraft Foods purchased Cadbury in 2010 for $19.6 billion. When Kraft split into two companies in 2012, the Adams gum unit remained under Mondelez International. Chiclets chewing gum was discontinued in 2016, but returned to production 2019.

By 2018, Mondelez sold off the Black Jack, Beemans, and Clove brands. It then sold the remainder of its United States, Canada, and European gum assets to Perfetti Van Melle in 2023.

== Brands ==
- Adams California Fruit (c. 1917–1970s)
- Adams Sour (1970–early 1980s)
- Beemans (1890–)
- Black Jack (1884–)
- Bubblicious (1977–)
- Certs (1956–2018, 2025–)
- Chewels (1977–92)
- Chiclets (1900–)
- Clove (1890–)
- Clorets (1951–)
- Dentyne (1899–)
- Freshen-Up (1975–2019)
- Trident (1960–)

== See also ==
- American Chicle Company Building, New Orleans
- Charles Ranlett Flint
