= Black Jack (gum) =

Brand of chewing gum

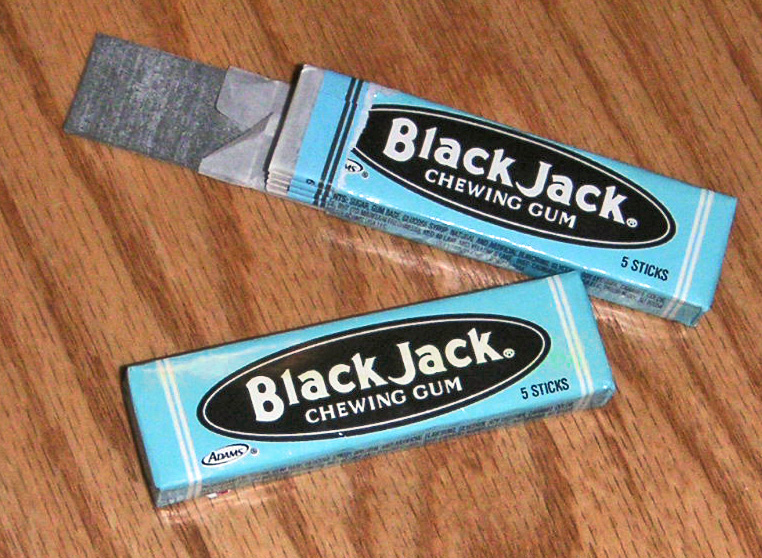
- Two 5-stick packs of Black Jack gum
- Product type: Chewing gum
- Current owner: Gerrit J. Verburg Co. (2018–present)
- Country: United States
- Introduced: 1884; 142 years ago
- Previous owners: List: American Chicle Company (1884–1962); Warner–Lambert (1962–2000); Pfizer (2000–02); Cadbury Schweppes (2002–10); Kraft (2010–12); Mondelez (2012–18)

Black Jack is an aniseed-flavored chewing gum manufactured by the American company Gerrit J. Verburg Co.

== History ==
In 1869, exiled former Mexican president and general Antonio Lopez de Santa Anna (famous for losing the Texas War of Independence) was living in New Jersey. He brought Mexican chicle with him in hopes of selling it to raise funds to help him return to power in his home country.

1926 ad for the product

He persuaded Thomas Adams of Staten Island, New York, to buy it. Adams, a photographer and inventor, intended to vulcanize the chicle for use as a rubber substitute.

Adams' efforts at vulcanization failed, but he noticed that Santa Anna liked to chew the chicle, which the ancient Mayans had done. Disappointed with the rubber experiments, Adams boiled a small batch of chicle in his kitchen to create a chewing gum. He gave some to a local store to see if people would buy it; they did and he began production.

In 1871, Adams received a patent on a gum-making machine and began mass-producing chicle-based gum. His first product ("Snapping and Stretching") was pure chicle with no flavoring, but sold well enough to encourage Adams in his plans. He began to experiment with flavorings, beginning with sarsaparilla. In 1884, he began adding licorice flavoring and called his invention "Adams' Black Jack", the first flavored gum in the U.S. It was also the first gum to be offered in sticks.

Black Jack Gum was sold well into the 1970s, until production ceased due to slow sales. It was re-introduced in 1986 and again in 2019.

== Ownership ==
Warner–Lambert acquired the American Chicle Company, including the Adams brand, in 1962. The American Chicle Company was renamed to Adams in 1997. Pfizer, which had bought Warner-Lambert in 2000, sold Adams and all of Pfizer's other candy brands to Cadbury in 2003. This unit became Cadbury Adams.

In 2019, Gerrit J. Verburg acquired the Black Jack gum brand among several others from Mondelez International, the parent company of Cadbury.

== In popular culture ==
In the Seinfeld episode "The Library", Jerry remembers his high school girlfriend Sherry Becker as an avid chewer of Black Jack, but upon meeting her again she states her distaste for it and insists that she preferred Dentyne.

In the 1990 movie Pump Up The Volume, Christian Slater's character chews Black Jack gum.

In the television series Homeland, the character of acting CIA director Saul Berenson is revealed as chewing a large amount of Black Jack gum during important operations for good luck.

In Season 3 Episode 15 "Three Amigos" of the television series Northern Exposure, Maurice J. Minnifield (Barry Corbin) is given a pack of Black Jack gum by Ruth-Ann (Peg Phillips) the general store owner, to be buried with his newly deceased friend.

In Season 7 episode 2 of the Amazon show Bosch, detective Jamie Edgar (Jamie Hector) is seen chewing Black Jack gum after a late night hangover, which he keeps in his police locker.
