= Copper gluconate =

Chemical compound

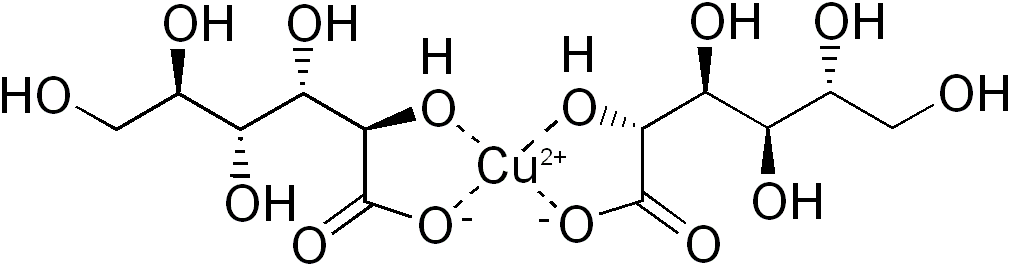

Clinical data
- AHFS/Drugs.com: Micromedex Detailed Consumer Information
- MedlinePlus: a601072
- Routes of administration: Oral
- ATC code: V03AB20 (WHO)

Identifiers
- IUPAC name: Copper(II) gluconate
- CAS Number: 527-09-3
- PubChem CID: 10692
- ChemSpider: 10242
- UNII: RV823G6G67
- CompTox Dashboard (EPA): DTXSID4035960
- ECHA InfoCard: 100.007.645

Chemical and physical data
- Formula: C_{12}H_{22}CuO_{14}
- Molar mass: 453.840 g·mol^{−1}
- 3D model (JSmol): Interactive image
- Melting point: 156 °C (313 °F)
- Solubility in water: 30 mg/mL (20 °C)
- SMILES: C([C@H]([C@H]([C@@H]([C@H](C(=O)[O-])O)O)O)O)O.C([C@H]([C@H]([C@@H]([C@H](C(=O)[O-])O)O)O)O)O.[Cu+2]
- InChI: InChI=1S/2C6H12O7.Cu/c2*7-1-2(8)3(9)4(10)5(11)6(12)13;/h2*2-5,7-11H,1H2,(H,12,13);/q;;+2/p-2/t2*2-,3-,4+,5-;/m11./s1; Key:OCUCCJIRFHNWBP-IYEMJOQQSA-L

Copper gluconate is the copper salt of D-gluconic acid. It is an odorless, light blue or blue-green crystal or powder which is easily soluble in water and insoluble in ethanol.

== Uses ==
- Dietary supplement to treat copper deficiency.
- Ingredient of Retsyn, which was an ingredient of Certs breath mints.
- Fertilizer deficiency corrector to treat a lack of this nutrient.

== Side effects ==
The U.S. Institute of Medicine (IOM) sets tolerable upper intake levels (ULs) for vitamins and minerals when evidence is sufficient. In the case of copper the adult UL is set at 10 mg/day.

Copper gluconate is sold as a dietary supplement to provide copper. The typical dose is 2.0 mg copper per day. This is one-fifth what the IOM considers a safe upper limit. Long-term intake at amounts higher than the UL may cause liver damage.
