= Freshen Up =

Flavored chewing gum in Brazil

Freshen Up was a brand of chewing gum with liquid centers manufactured by Cadbury Adams in Brazil. Flavours included cinnamon, peppermint, spearmint and bubble gum, with a fruit variation that was introduced in the 1970s.

== History ==
The product was launched in 1975. In 2019, the brand was discontinued by the manufacturer.

== Factory explosion ==
In 1976, an explosion of the Freshen Up gum manufacturing line at the American Chicle factory in Queens, New York killed six workers. The New York State Supreme Court justice in Queens dismissed the manslaughter and homicide charges against the Warner-Lambert Company and the four executives the following year.
