= Chiclets =

Brand of candy-coated chewing gum

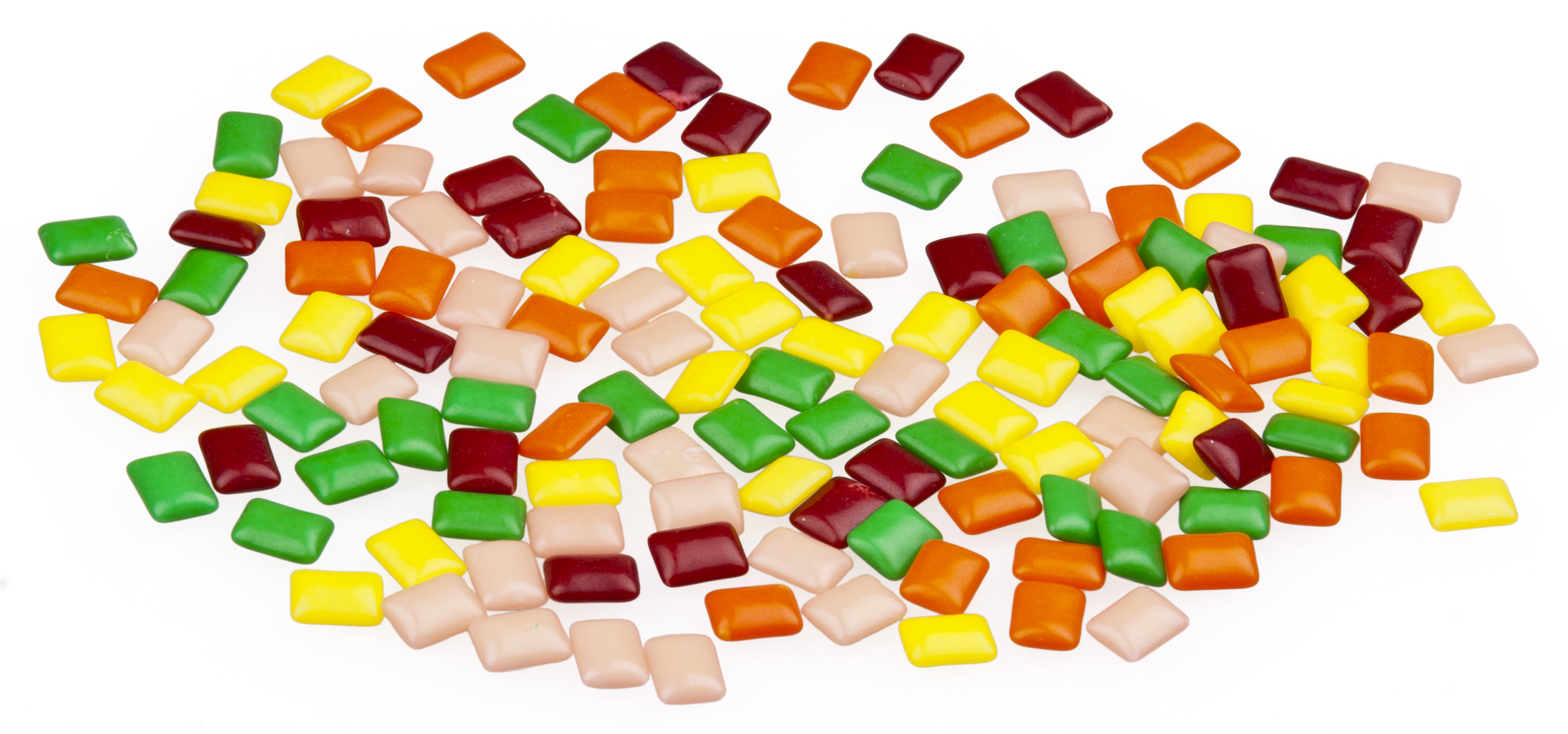
- Product type: Chewing gum
- Current owner: Perfetti Van Melle
- Country: United States
- Introduced: 1900; 126 years ago
- Previous owners: List: American Chicle Company; Adams Gum; Warner-Lambert; Pfizer; Cadbury Schweppes; Kraft; Mondelez

Chiclets is an American brand of candy-coated chewing gum owned by Perfetti Van Melle. The brand was introduced in 1900 by the American Chicle Company, a company founded by Thomas Adams.

== History ==
The Chiclets name derives from the Mexican Spanish word chicle, from the Aztec Nahuatl word "chictli/tzictli", meaning "sticky stuff" and referring to a pre-Columbian chewing gum found throughout Mesoamerica. This pre-Columbian chewing gum was tapped as a sap from various trees.

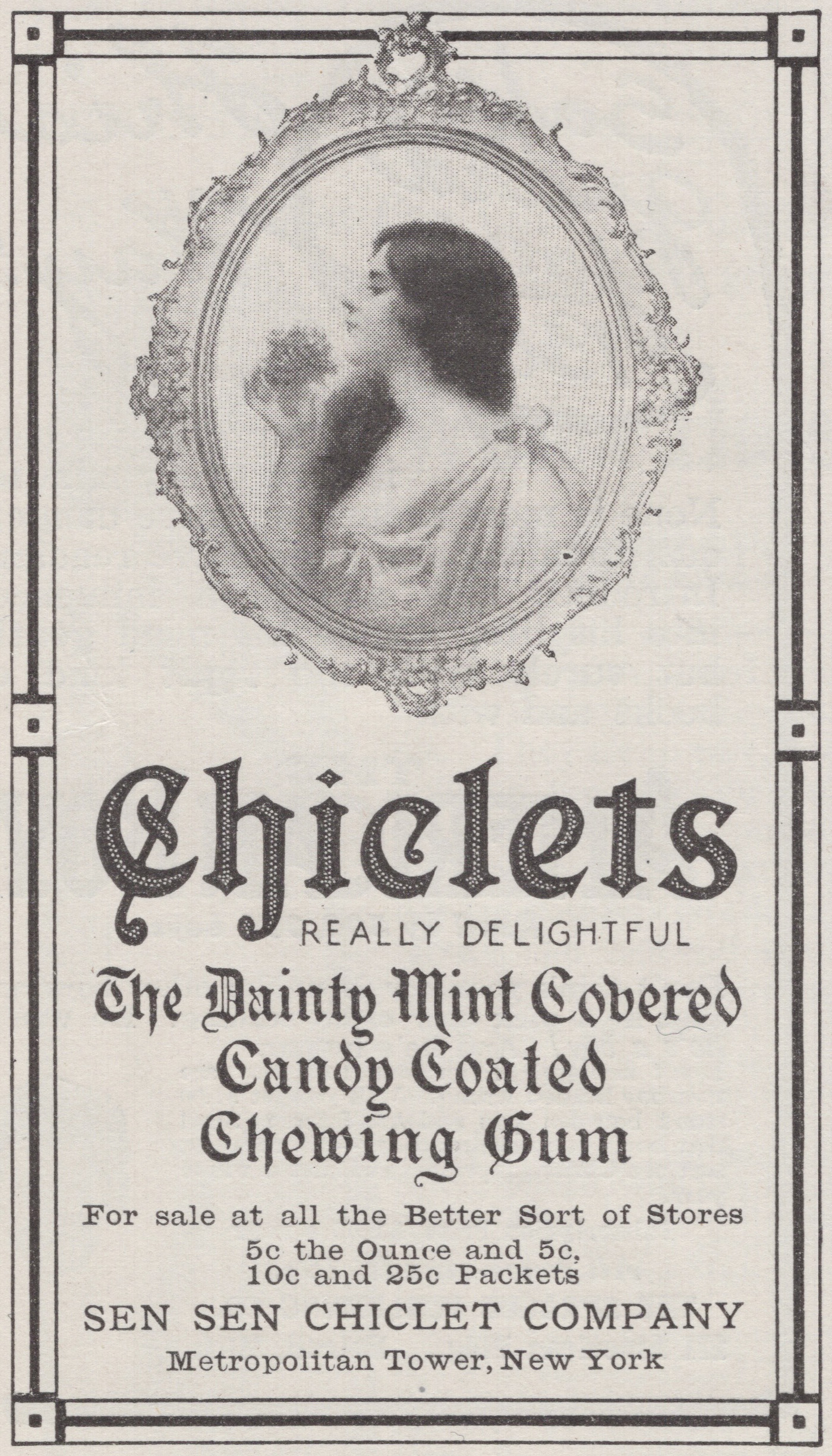
1912 advertisement

Chiclets are essentially the same as regular chewing gum, with the innovation of a hard sugar coating offered in various flavors and colors. The original flavor was peppermint, and assorted fruit flavors were available in Algeria, Argentina, Canada, Colombia, the Dominican Republic, Egypt, India, Iraq, Lebanon, Mexico, Portugal, Syria, Turkey, the United Kingdom, Venezuela, and parts of the Americas. In some markets, the brand is known as "Adams' Chiclets", named after brand founder Thomas Adams.

Both in Brazil and in Portugal, the name chiclete became a generic word for chewing gum due to the popularity of the brand.

Various people have been credited with inventing Chiclets, including the brothers Robert and Frank Fleer and Louis Mahle.

In 2019, the Saturday Evening Post said that as of 2016, Mondelez had discontinued selling Chiclets in the United States. It has re-appeared as of 2019, manufactured in Mexico. In 2020 the Trademark Trial and Appeal Board held that the Chiclets trademark had not been abandoned. To further confuse the issue, it was noted in an article on the Mashed website that Chiclets, identified as Adams Chiclets, were available at Walmart, Kmart and Amazon in the United States. Ingredient lists now show aspartame being used as a sweetener, while still showing sugar and glucose.

On December 19, 2022, Mondelez announced that it was selling its gum business, including the Chiclets brands, to Perfetti Van Melle, the makers of Mentos. The deal closed on October 2, 2023.

In ice hockey, the slang term spitting chiclets describes spitting broken teeth onto the ice (the teeth supposedly resembling Chiclets), a not-uncommon event in ice hockey, where hard blows to the face are a hazard of play. A popular hockey podcast is named Spittin' Chiclets.
