= Chicle =

Natural gum derived from trees of the genus Manilkara

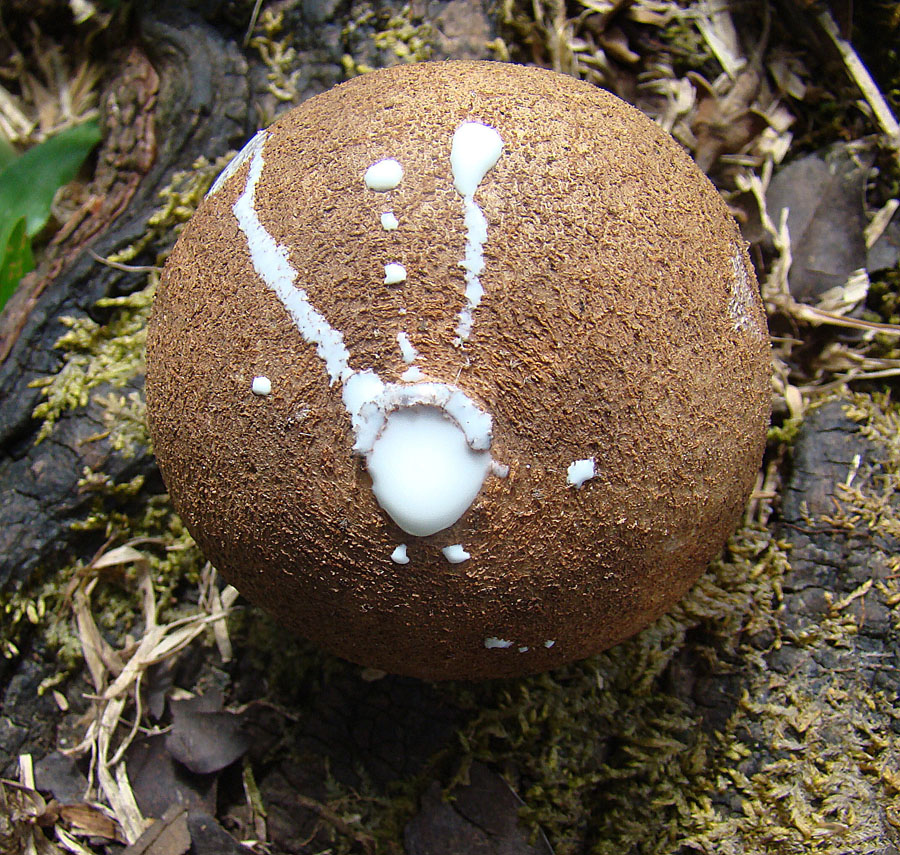
Chicle (white substance) oozing from the pod of a Manilkara zapota (sapodilla) tree in Panama

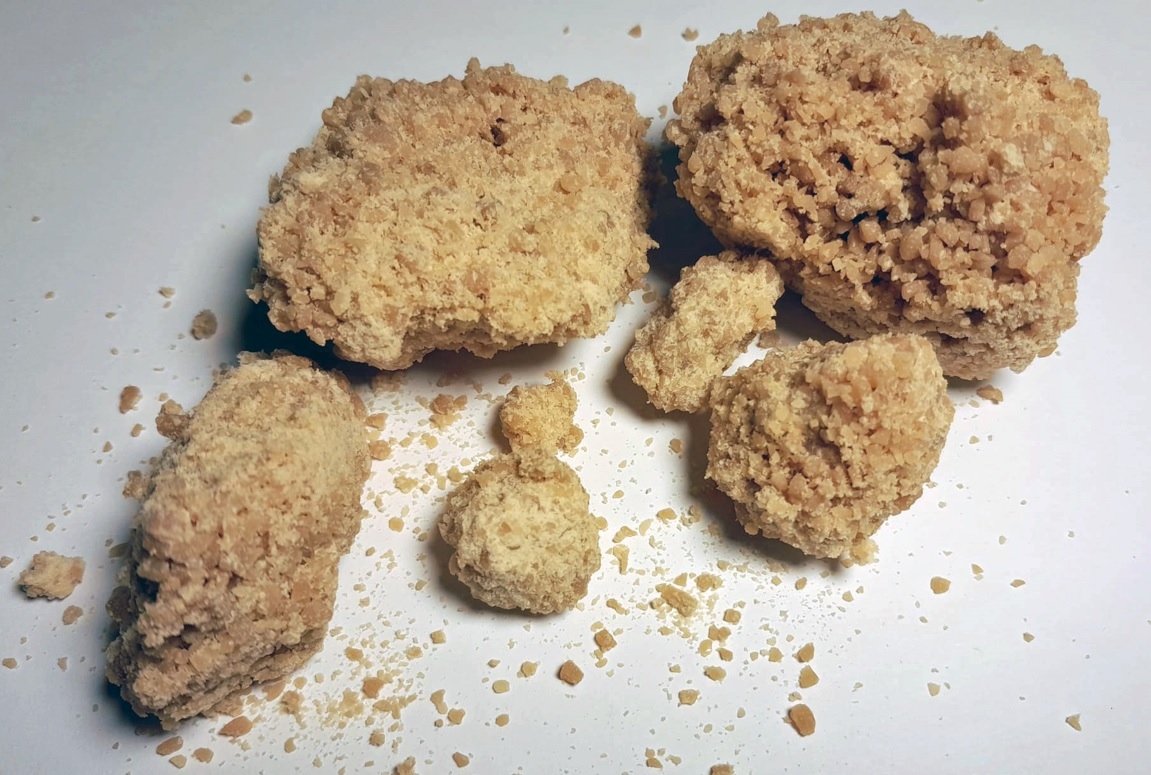
Chicle chunks

Chicle (/ˈtʃɪkəl/) is a latex traditionally used in making chewing gum and other products. It is collected from several species of Mesoamerican trees in the genus Manilkara, including M. zapota, M. chicle, M. staminodella, and M. bidentata.

The tapping of the gum is similar to the tapping of latex from the rubber tree: zig-zag gashes are made in the tree trunk and the dripping gum is collected in small bags. It is then boiled until it reaches the correct thickness. Locals who collect chicle are called chicleros.

== Etymology ==
The word chicle comes from the Nahuatl word for the latex, tzictli [ˈt͡sikt͡ɬi], which can be translated as "sticky stuff". Alternatively, it may have come from the Mayan word tsicte. Chicle was well known to the Aztecs and to the Maya, and early European settlers prized it for its subtle flavor and high sugar content. The word is used in the Americas and Spain to refer to chewing gum, chicle being a common term for it in Spanish and chiclete being the Portuguese term (both in Brazil and in parts of Portugal; other areas also use the term chicla). The word has also been exported to other languages such as Greek, which refers to chewing gum as τσίχλα (tsichla).

== History ==
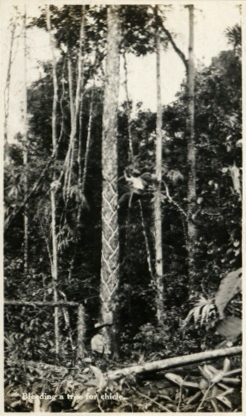
A chiclero bleeding a tree for chicle, Belize 1917

Both the Aztecs and Maya traditionally chewed chicle. It was chewed as a way to stave off hunger, freshen breath, and keep teeth clean. Chicle was also used by the Maya as a filling for tooth cavities.

The American Chicle Company, incorporated in June 1899, was the first prominent commercial user of this ingredient in the production of chewing gum. Its brand name, Chiclets, is derived from the word chicle.

In response to a land reform law passed in Guatemala in 1952 which ended feudal work relations and expropriated unused lands and sold them to the indigenous and peasants, the William Wrigley Company discontinued buying Guatemalan chicle. Since it was the sole buyer of Guatemalan chicle, the government was pushed to create a massive aid program for growers.

By the 1960s, most chewing gum companies had switched from using chicle to polybutadiene, which was cheaper to manufacture. Only a handful of small gum companies still use chicle, including Gud Gum, Glee Gum, Simply Gum, and Tree Hugger Gum.
