= Warner–Lambert =

American pharmaceutical company

- Type: Private
- Industry: Pharmaceutical
- Founded: 1856; 170 years ago Philadelphia, Pennsylvania, U.S.
- Founder: William R. Warner
- Defunct: 2000; 26 years ago
- Fate: Acquired by Pfizer in 2000, Adams confectionery business was sold to Cadbury Schweppes in 2002, Personal Healthcare division was sold to Energizer in 2003, and consumer healthcare division was sold to Johnson & Johnson in 2006
- Successors: Kenvue (Consumer Healthcare); Pfizer (Pharmaceuticals); Edgewell Personal Care (Personal Care); Mondelez International (Mints); Perfetti Van Melle (Gums)
- Headquarters: Morris Plains
- Parent: Pfizer

Warner–Lambert was an American pharmaceutical company.

== History ==
Formerly two separate entities, the first company was started in 1856, when William R. Warner founded a drug store in Philadelphia. Warner went on to invent a tablet coating process gaining him a place in the Smithsonian Institution. William R. Warner and Company Limited acquired several other cosmetics companies in the early 20th century, and was renamed Warner-Hudnut, Inc. in 1950. The second half of the name came from Jordan Wheat Lambert, founder of the Lambert Pharmacal Company of St. Louis, famous for Listerine. The two companies merged in 1955, to form Warner–Lambert.

Over the years, the company expanded through many mergers and acquisitions to become an international competitor in several businesses. In 1956, Warner–Lambert acquired Nepera Chemical (the makers of Anahist) from the Lasdon family, many of whom then became officers and directors of the merged business.

In 1962, Warner-Lambert bought American Chicle, one of the world's largest manufacturers of gums and mints. The 1965 acquisition of a small cough tablet company in the United Kingdom resulted in the success of the Halls Mentho-Lyptus brand on a global scale. In 1970, Warner-Lambert bought the Schick razor blade company, founded in 1926 by Jacob Schick. In the same year, they also took over Parke-Davis, founded in Detroit in 1866, by Hervey Parke and George Davis. This was followed by acquisitions of Wilkinson Sword in March 1993, and Agouron Pharmaceuticals in January 1999.

Its subsidiary Parke-Davis marketed the antidiabetic drug Rezulin, which was approved by the FDA in January 1997 but withdrawn by them in early 2000.

In the end of the 1990s, Warner–Lambert formed an alliance with Pfizer to bring its drug Lipitor to market. Lipitor launched in January 1997 to resounding success, reaching $1B in domestic sales within its first twelve months on the market. By 1999, Warner-Lambert was in agreement to merge with American Home Products, before Pfizer made its own offer to acquire the company. In February 2000, Pfizer bought Warner Lambert along with all of its subsidiary companies. The headquarters of Warner–Lambert in Morris Plains, New Jersey, was subsequently used by Pfizer, Johnson & Johnson, and Honeywell.
