= Eating disorders and memory =

Memory impairments linked to eating disorders

Many memory impairments exist as a result from or cause of eating disorders. Eating disorders (EDs) are characterized by abnormal and disturbed eating patterns that affect the lives of the individuals who worry about their weight to the extreme. These abnormal eating patterns involve either inadequate or excessive food intake, affecting the individual's physical and mental health.

In regard to mental health, individuals with eating disorders appear to have impairments in executive functioning, visual-spatial ability, divided and sustained attention, verbal functioning, learning, and memory. Some memory impairments found in individuals with eating disorders are due to nutritional deficiencies, as well as various cognitive and attentional biases. Neurobiological differences have been found in individuals with ED compared to healthy individuals, and these differences are reflected in specific memory impairments. There are certain treatments and effects of treatments, aimed at these ED-specific memory impairments. Animal research and areas of future research in relation to ED and memory, are also integral to understanding the effects of ED on memory. There are three particular diagnoses of eating disorders that have been linked to memory impairments: anorexia nervosa (AN), bulimia nervosa (BN), and binge eating disorder (BED).

Many areas of the brain are affected by eating disorders, and this is reflected in memory performance.

== Memory impairments ==
=== Memory biases ===
Individuals with eating disorders show increased tendencies to direct their attention toward irregular eating-related thought processing and attentional bias compared to non-ED individuals. Studies have suggested a strong link between eating disorders and information processing, such as attention and memory. All types of eating disorders (bulimia nervosa, anorexia nervosa, and EDNOS) consistently display attentional biases towards disorder-related stimuli specific to their ED. Examples of disorder-related stimuli include food, shape, weight, and size. This heightened attention to disorder-related stimuli leads to higher levels of encoding, consolidation and retrieval of this information, acting as a potential cause for the mental maintenance of the disorder(s).

Individuals with eating disorders display several memory and attentional biases to food, shape, weight and size. Specific memory biases include:

- Directed-forgetting: individuals with eating disorders, particularly anorexia nervosa, display more difficulty in forgetting information or cues related to body, shape, and food than those without eating disorders. This leads to greater availability of such memories, facilitating the maintenance of the eating disorder.
- Schema-related: display maladaptive perceptions of food, shape, weight and self that lead to obsessive attention on and enhanced memory for these items, leading to maintaining the eating disorder thought and eating behaviour. Memories for these items are more easily encoded and retrieved compared to other information. Most of the research in this area has been on individuals with anorexia nervosa. Cued recall tasks, recognition tasks and Stroop task tests are used to study these effects. Some studies have shown contradictory results to ED individuals' heightened attention and enhanced memory, however the difference could be attributed to an anxiety-induced response and avoidance behaviour. This could cause impairments in the individuals' ability to remember the information learned, and suggests that more research needs to be done in this area to better understand the relationship between schema-related biases and ED's.
- Selective memory bias: studies have been done on individuals with bulimia nervosa, suggesting selective memory bias exists for positive and negative weight-related items compared to emotional items. Biases towards food-related items were also found, a common finding in individuals with depression.

=== Explicit memory ===
Patients with anorexia nervosa show a strong explicit memory bias towards anorexia-related words. In one study, participants (AN group compared to a control group) were presented with a list of words divided into four categories: positive, negative, neutral, and anorexia-related. They were then tested explicitly with cued recall, and it was found that the AN participants better favored the anorexia-related words, showing a schema-related memory bias. Participants were also tested implicitly with word stem completion tests, but no implicit bias was found.

In another study, AN participants were found to have less ability to concentrate in the presence of explicit distractors, as well as to have a conscious cognitive bias towards illness-related words. These explicit biases were associated with a longer duration of the illness. A different study characterized AN patients as having trouble integrating positive and negative experiences and that the length of the illness also affected these symptoms and reinforced these impairments. The results of these studies suggest that there are clear differences in the explicit cognitive processing of stimuli between AN individuals and healthy controls and that the length of the illness can affect the extent of these memory biases.

A different study showed that currently ill AN patients had problems with immediate and delayed verbal recall; these disadvantages were also found in weight-restored AN individuals. There was no difference between healthy controls and AN patients in working memory, just memory function. This study demonstrates that there are not only memory biases found in AN individuals but memory impairments as well.

Autobiographical memory deficits have been found in individuals with AN. One study found that AN patients with a history of sexual abuse had impairments in their autobiographical memory characterized by their increased general memory recall. Another study found that anorexic patients are characterized by an overgeneralization of both positive and negative autobiographical memories, which positively correlates with the duration of the illness. The impairment of both positive and negative memories suggests a general impairment in the access to emotional memories. Therefore anorexic patients are more prone to suppress or control not only negative but also positive affect. One hypothesis suggests that these more general memories are what allow these patients to reduce the impact of a negative event.

In one study, participants (bulimia nervosa patients and healthy controls) were exposed to television commercials that were neutral, food-related or body-related. Recall and recognition tests were carried out to test for an explicit memory bias. When compared to healthy controls, BN patients had less recall and recognition for body-related stimuli. This suggests that BN individuals avoid encoding/processing stimuli related to body image and have a selective memory bias.

Obese individuals with binge eating disorders have been compared with obese controls to see if there are different explicit memory biases between these two groups of people. It was found that both groups showed a bias towards negative words, but individuals with BED retrieved positive words less often. This demonstrates an explicit memory bias in which individuals with BED avoid encoding or pay less attention to positive words and focus their conscious attention almost exclusively on negative words. This is similar to the selective memory bias mentioned above.

=== Implicit memory ===
It was once thought that individuals with eating disorders had different implicit memory biases and attitudes towards food, depending on the type of eating disorder. BED was associated with a positive evaluation of food, and anorexia and bulimia were associated with a negative evaluation of food. This turns out not to be the case. There were no implicit differences in affective attitudes towards foods between high and low-restraint eaters. This suggests that regardless of the type of eating disorder, individuals with eating disorders view food in similar ways and attitudes towards food.

Focusing on obesity, it has been found that obese individuals have more negative attitudes towards high-fat foods than a normal weight control group. It has also been found that children, particularly obese children, were faster at pushing a positive key than a negative key for food. These different attitudes towards food at different ages could represent different stages in the development of obesity. Future research could be done to explore these effects found in obesity and determine if similar effects are seen in individuals with binge eating disorder and perhaps also in individuals with anorexia and bulimia.

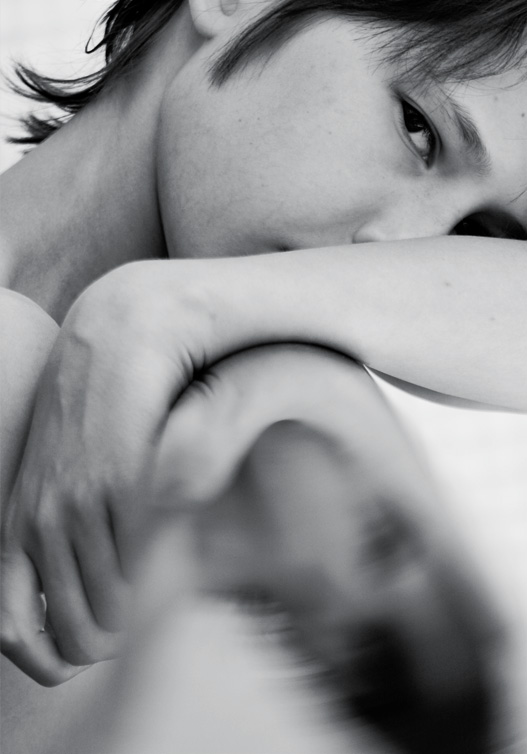
Individuals with eating disorders have been shown to develop negative affect in social situations, and therefore learn to expect others to be unavailable and insensitive to their needs.

=== Other ===
A study on the effects of priming combined event-related potential (ERP) and behavioural reactions, and investigated explicit and implicit associations between shape, weight, and self-evaluations. This was done by means of shape/weight related priming sentences and target words. ERP, reaction times, and subject ratings were collected and priming effects were analyzed. Results showed that there were stronger affective priming effects in patients with AN and BN compared to healthy controls, showing that eating disorder (ED) patients associate shape/weight concerns not only with appearance, but also nonappearance-related self-evaluation domains of interpersonal relationships and also with achievement and performance.

Social cognition is the understanding and action in interpersonal situations, and include cognitive processes involved in how people perceive and interpret information about themselves, others, and social situations. The dysfunction of social control may play a role in eating disorders. Women with ED have been shown to have lower levels of negative affect attribution compared to healthy controls, which suggests that they learn to expect others to be unavailable and insensitive to their needs. In addition, these patients were less successful at correctly encoding cause-effect relations in a social contexts and it has been suggested that their capacity to mentalize experiences is impaired. In addition to impairments in social cognition, it has been found that individuals with ED have an inability to recognize, label, and respond to different emotional states, and are impaired in visual recognition tasks.

Dementia is a disorder characterized by multiple deficits in cognition, including memory impairments. Patients with various forms of dementia have impairments in their activities of daily living including eating, and eating disorders have been found in patients with dementia. Patients with frontotemporal dementia (FTD) tend to have an eating disorder where they have food cravings and difficulty controlling the amount and type of food eaten but their memory and spatial functioning is not affected. Meanwhile, patients with Alzheimer's disease (AD), do not have this impairment, but their memory and spatial loss is negatively affected. Similar findings were shown where patients with fronto variant-frontotemporal dementia (fvFTD) show more severe and frequent symptoms of eating disorders than patients with AD. ED in patients with dementia have been tracked back to lesions in the frontal subcortical circuits including the anterior cingulate circuit, and data suggests that ED seem to be distinctive features of behavioural syndromes in groups of patients with fvFTD.

== Neurobiology ==
Neurobiological differences have been found between individuals with eating disorders (ED) and healthy individuals. These differences are reflected in memory abilities and capabilities. Some of the main neurobiological differences are highlighted below:

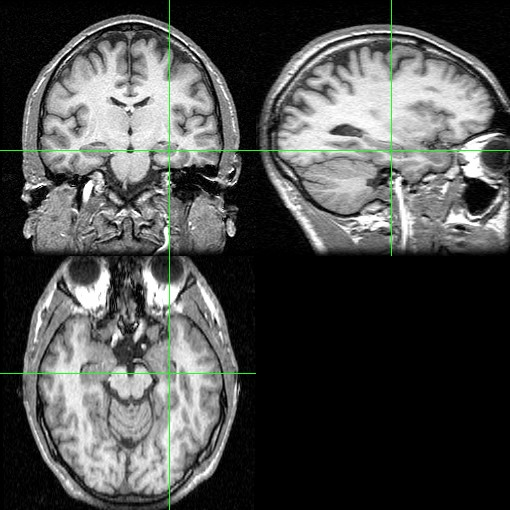
An MRI scan with the hippocampus indicated in a coronal, lateral and horizontal view.

=== Anorexia nervosa ===
Imbalances found in certain serotonin receptor activity in cortical association regions, including the frontal lobes, are found in individuals with AN and may be the cause of impairment in their working memory, attention, motivation, and concentration. In addition, the ability of individuals with AN to activate remote memories, learn new information, plan ahead, regulate actions according to environmental stimuli, and shift behavioural sets appropriately are all implicated. Some individuals with anorexia nervosa (AN) have an inability to change their pattern response behaviours, which has been linked to disturbances found in the cortical and subgenual cingulate - mesial temporal pathways of these individuals.

The reduced blood flow in the limbic system of individuals with AN is what mostly accounts for their impairment in cognitive functioning. More specifically, the set of structures in the limbic system including the temporal lobes and adjacent structures like the hypothalamus, amygdala, and hippocampus are important in memory as well as emotion, appetite regulation, motivation, and perception, and are therefore implicated. Reduced cerebral blood flow to these areas have also been associated with impairments in complex visual memory, enhanced information processing and visuospatial ability.

Individuals with AN have been reported to have prolonged exposure to high levels of corticosteroids, a class of chemicals involved in things such as stress and behaviour, and prolonged exposure to corticosteroids has been associated with impairments in memory and learning. The hippocampus is an area of the brain that is dense with corticosteroid receptors, and therefore may be what is mediating these impairments.

=== Bulimia nervosa ===
Activation of the medial prefrontal cortex has been shown in some studies to reflect self-schemata evaluation of relevant information, and could be used to investigate body image representations in individuals with bulimia nervosa (BN). In addition, increased activation in brain areas associated with information processing like the dorsal and anterior medial prefrontal cortex (mPFC), adjacent areas of the cingulate cortex, and the posterior cingulate and precuneus have been implicated in individuals with BN, meaning that the working memory used to actively manipulate information in these individuals is affected.

Areas of the brain such as the insula and anterior cingulate cortex (ACC) have been found to be disturbed in individuals with BN. These areas are involved in self-regulation as well as executive control which controls cognitive processes including working memory, and may be the reason for impairment.

=== Binge eating ===
An increase in dopamine in the caudate and putamen have been found in binge eaters, and studies have found a decrease in a particular serotonin transporter (5-HT) in binge eaters compared to controls. Both the caudate nucleus and putamen make up the dorsal striatum and are important as part of the brain's memory system. Dopamine is required to allow these structures to perform properly and thus this is affected in individuals with binge eating disorders, however the exact mechanism is unknown.

A dysregulation of the ventral limbic circuit has been found in individuals who binge eat. The ventral limbic circuit is important in the regulation of feeding behaviour and includes the amygdalae, insula, ventral striatum, ventral regions of the anterior ACC, and orbitofrontal cortex (OFC). A stronger activation of the OFC has been found in patients who binge eat compared to normal weight controls, when viewing pictures of food.

=== Conditioning ===
The regulation of eating is controlled by areas of the brain involved in behaviour reinforcement. The rewarding qualities of food, including taste and smell, activate regions of the brain that are impaired in patients with anorexia nervosa (AN) and bulimia nervosa (BN), including the orbitofrontal cortex (OFC), anterior cingulate cortex (ACC), anteromedial temporal, and the insula.

Normally, eating is pleasant when an individual is hungry and less pleasant when an individual is full. Neuronal activation in the OFC decreases when an individual is full, however there is a disturbance in this pathway in individuals with AN and BN. Thus, patients with AN have little response to food or a quick response to being full, and patients with BN have an exaggerated response to food or a decrease in feeling full.

Areas of the cortex receive signals of being full by the gut through subcortical mechanisms including the thalamus which relays information from associated systems in the hypothalamus. The hypothalamus has projections into the nucleus accumbens (NAcc), which is involved in the reward system of feeding. Increased extracellular acetylcholine from interneurons in the NAcc have been found to be associated with the discontinuation of eating, and the dysregulation of this mechanism has been found in the food-reward system in eating disorder studies.

=== Body image ===
Neurons located in different structures of the medial temporal lobe are what cause the transformation from an egocentric to an allocentric representation in space. The hippocampus generates allocentric representations for long-term memory, and the parietal cortex, retrosplenial cortex, entorhinal cortex, and hippocampus are part of a network that processes allocentric spatial information. The lateral entorhinal cortex carries nonspatial information from the perirhinal cortex to the dorsal hippocampus where it is then combined with the medial entorhinal cortex to create object-place or event-place representations in the hippocampus.

Impairment of the transformation from an egocentric to allocentric representation of oneself is what is thought to be behind the origin of obesity and eating disorders, where the egocentric perception-driven experience of an individual's real body image cannot change the allocentric memory-driven experience of a negative body, and an individual is therefore “locked” in an allocentric view of a negative representation of their body. In addition, stress and chronic stress can cause damage to the hippocampus through the overwhelming activity of the amygdala on the hippocampus.

== Nutritional deficiencies and memory ==
Nutrition has proven to show effects on cognitive abilities and spatial memory. The brain's neuronal and glial cells require sufficient nutrients for energy to perform important cognitive functions such as attention and memory, and without a steady supply of nutrients including glucose, fatty acids, and vitamins B1 (Thiamine), neural activation required for memory functions becomes impaired. Individuals with eating disorders often lack the ability to consume the required amount of these nutrients, resulting in notable cognitive impairments such as those necessary for proper memory functioning.

Areas of the brain effected by glucose (frontal lobe (pink), temporal lobe (yellow) and parietal lobe (blue)).

Glucose is the preferred energy source for the brain, accounting for 25% of the body's glucose consumption, despite being only 2% of the body's total weight. Glucose, along with serotonin, have been found to have significant effects within the cingulate cortex, frontal lobe, temporal lobe, and parietal lobe regions of the brain, including in those with anorexia. Individuals with eating disorders such as bulimia and anorexia show lower neural metabolism of glucose, possibly due to neural consequences of the disorder and/or due to heightened anxiety or depression. Studies have indicated the importance of glucose on memory, showing that reduced levels of glucose in the brain impair an individual's ability to retrieve memories. Most evidence suggests that severe negative impairments are due to long term, prolonged glucose deprivation or restriction, such as those seen in individuals affected by eating disorders, however effects have been studied on a more short-term basis with negative memory impairments seen in individuals who consumed breakfast compared to those who did not.

The brain contains high concentrations of lipids than any other organ in the body with the most prominent type being polyunsaturated fatty acids (PUFAs), such as omega-3 fatty acids (ω-3). Evidence that shows that low-fat intake occurs during weight loss in adolescent girls with eating disorders. Dietary ω-3 fatty acids play a particularly important role in prevention of neuropsychiatric disorders such as depression and Alzheimer's disease. Studies using animal models have expressed that ω-3 deficiencies result in diminished synaptic plasticity, impaired learning, memory and emotional coping performance later in life.

All B vitamins play a part in helping the nervous system function properly. Vitamin B1 (thiamine) is an important B vitamin and is associated with Korsakoff's syndrome, a neurological disorder due to the lack of vitamin B1. Chronic alcohol abuse is the number one cause of this syndrome, but unfortunately, even though supplementation may improve muscle co-ordination, it usually cannot reverse memory loss. Case studies have reported that the co-morbidity between eating disorders and substance abuse as a significant health issue for women, and the subgroup of patients with AN who also misuse alcohol are at particular risk of developing Korsakoff's syndrome. In other studies regarding thiamine deficiency, impairments in spatial memory, retrograde amnesia, episodic memory and working memory have all been observed.

== Animal models used in eating disorders ==
Animal models have contributed a fair amount to the current understanding of eating disorders and obesity, in different ways and to different extents; one of the main reasons being the difference in pathophysiology of these disorders. The one specific feature of eating disorders not shared with animal behavior, is the personal choice to curtail food intake. The suitability and limitations of animal models in studies regarding human eating disorders have been discussed in various reviews. Several various types of animal models have been described which include: etiologic, isomorphic, mechanistic and predictive models.

=== Anorexia nervosa ===
The activity-based anorexia model has been one of the most suitable animal models when studying anorexia nervosa (AN). The important behavioral aspects of AN, the drive for activity, the restricted food intake during hunger, and other physiological consequences of malnutrition, are all reproduced in this model. The “activity/stress” model produces starvation-induced immunodeficiency and various complications not observed in individuals with AN. "Separation" models involve physical separation as a stressor to induce a depression-like condition; this includes decreased feeding, weight loss, and various cognitive changes . Studies with animal models simulating loss of hunger are not well suited to replicate AN because they are essentially based on the assumption of loss of appetite.

=== Bulimia nervosa ===
Two major factors found to contribute to binge eating in bulimia nervosa (BN) patients are: stress and negative emotions. One model of BN produces stress-induced hyperphagia, where rats go through periods of restricted food and then are allowed free access to food; this mimics the intermittent self-imposed fasting and yielding to food of BN patients. Sham-feeding rat models have been used to present the defect in the satiety mechanisms in BN due to vomiting or purging after food intake. It is known that multiple mechanisms regulate meal patterning, although in order to study them, precise consumption patterns of BN patients must be known; these intake patterns are still currently being studied.

Other models of binge eating have used various combinations of stress limited access to optional foods, and/or restriction/refeeding cycles, along with scheduled eating. These specific models have been able to address the consumptive side of BN, and have proven to be useful for testing drug effects on intake behavior. Due to the pharmacological response differences between rodents and humans, new drug development has been concentrating on drug testing specifically in human subjects.

=== Binge eating disorder ===
The development of animal models for binge eating has been necessary, because the mechanisms underlying the physiological and neural effects are not very well understood. Since the emotional aspects such as distress and loss of control prove difficult to model in animals, the central feature of the binge eating disorder, was attempted to be mimicked. Sham-feeding was the most prominent model used to study BED.

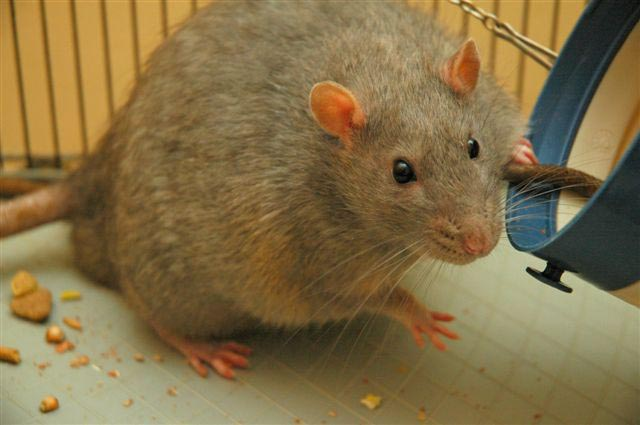
A Zucker rat which has developed diabetes due to a genetic disorder that causes obesity.

=== Obesity ===
Animal models have been able to provide key knowledge of the central and peripheral biological pathways regulating body weight and energy balance. They have proven effective and critical in examining environmental influences, along with identifying therapeutic targets and treatments. Animal models have been able to determine that malnutrition, maternal stress, and insulin injections can predispose offspring to adult obesity. Previous studies have identified the effect of the adipocyte hormone leptin, reveal that leptin treatments reverse obesity in knockout mice (ob/ob), and that diabetic (db/db) and Zucker fatty (fa/fa) rats (Zucker rat) display similar obesity phenotypes. Work on characterizing rodent obesity syndromes spontaneously arising from single gene mutations has been critical in obesity research. By 2007 there were 10 spontaneously single gene mutations characterized which deliberate an obesity phenotype. Currently, many investigators are using animal models in order to analyze genetic, neural, and physiological influences on susceptibility to diet-induced obesity.

== Treatments ==
=== Neurocognitive reserve ===
Cognition in individuals with anorexia nervosa (AN) has been shown to improve after treatment. It has been found that age, education, depression, body mass index (BMI), duration of illness, and length of hospitalization were not related to cognitive functioning during hospitalization and neuropsychological improvement. One of the predictors of cognitive impairment in individuals with AN is their cognitive reserve, where the greater cognitive reserve leads to more resiliency to cognitive impairment. The level of cognitive reserve predicts improvement in neuropsychological function including verbal memory, semantic fluency, basic auditory attention, and visuospatial construction. In addition, the level of cognitive reserve has been found to be associated with different AN prognosis and therefore treatment may be altered based on the cognitive reserve, where individuals who may experience more severe neuropsychological deficits may need more rehearsal and repeated practice of skills during treatment.

=== COMET ===
Low self-esteem is considered to be an important aspect of various eating disorders (ED). Implicit and opinions that refer to oneself are the main issues of low self-esteem, and competitive memory training (COMET) was developed as a treatment method for individuals with ED in order to target these opinions. COMET is aimed at making the knowledge that patients already know more easily retrieved from long-term memory by strengthening the retrieval of functional representations that are in competition with dysfunctional representations.

COMET emphasizes positive memories by using imagery, posture and facial expressions, self-verbalizations, and music. COMET stimulates emotional saliency of functional self-concepts by writing stories about scenes where positive characteristics are in action and repeatedly verbalized positive self-statements are connected to the scenes. Other techniques of COMET used to promote emotional salience include the deliberate movements of posture, facial expressions and imagery. Music that is selected by patients with ED is used to stimulate positive mood. COMET promotes higher and competitive retrieval by activating emotionally enhanced positive self-knowledge repeatedly, and then this knowledge is associated with situations and cues that trigger these dysfunctional negative self-concepts. Overall, studies have confirmed that COMET, in addition to regular therapy, enhances self-esteem in individuals with eating disorders and low self-esteem.

=== Virtual reality ===
A reference frame is a way someone can represent their location in space, and evidence has shown that our spatial experience involves the combination of our sensory inputs from two specific reference frames including egocentric and allocentric. The ability to represent and recall objects, including our own body, changes according to our frame of references, where an egocentric stance represents objects relative to ourselves while an allocentric stance represents objects independent of ourselves. These reference frames influence how memories are stored and retrieved where in the egocentric frame, an individual sees an event from their own perspective while in the allocentric frame, an individual sees themselves engaged in the event as an observer would.

In Western culture, the body is considered a personal symbol where slenderness is associated with happiness, success and social acceptability and being overweight is associated with laziness, lack of willpower and being out of control. Social influence may therefore explain the progression from the “locked” allocentric negative body image, to obesity or eating disorders (ED) because the media and culture both promote diet and controlled eating as methods to improve body-image satisfaction. Individuals with ED are not able to use their sensory inputs to update allocentric representations of the body, therefore they hate their body even after significant weight loss and continue to attempt to improve it.

Virtual reality (VR) has been aimed at fixing this issue by helping to change the experience of the body and to improve body image in patients with ED or obesity. In VR sessions, patients enter a virtual environment that causes them to face critical situations and are then helped to develop specific strategies to cope and avoid these situations. Side effects of VR include nausea and dizziness. Overall, good results were found during treatment with experiential cognitive therapy that also included specific body-image protocol based on VR in obese and binge-eating patients.
