= Rev7 Gum =

Chewing gum

Rev7
- Rev7 Gum, UK (above) and US (below)
- Product type: Chewing gum
- Current owner: Revolymer Ltd.
- Country: United Kingdom
- Introduced: 2010
- Markets: United Kingdom and United States

Rev7 Gum was a chewing gum, which after chewing is to some extent removable and biodegradable. The idea behind the gum's composition was developed by Professor Terence Cosgrove at the University of Bristol and it was developed by the British company Revolymer.

Rev7 is designed to be a low adhesive gum that, unlike conventional gum, can be easily removed from a variety of surfaces, and which degrades and disperses over a short time-scale when in contact with water.

== Composition ==
Conventional chewing gums use poly(styrene-co-butadiene) or poly(ethylene-co-vinylacetate). In contrast, Rev7 Gum contains an amphiphilic material, containing both hydrophobic (water repellent) and hydrophilic (water attracting) regions, which aids in the degradability and removability of the substance. It is composed of a polyisoprene backbone and grafts of poly(ethylene oxide) (PEO) and has a CAS number of 1246080-53-4.

== Development ==
The polymer was developed at the University of Bristol in an effort to curb pollution issues, due to regular chewing gum, which are prevalent in the United Kingdom. Britain spends over £150 million annually (as of 2008) on gum cleanup efforts, using techniques such as high pressure steam hoses, corrosive materials, and freezing machines to help remove this synthetic material from sidewalks and other public spaces.

Its name is derived from the word "revolution" (Rev), and the number of attempts it took to achieve the degradable gum (7). Rev7 has two flavours: Natural Peppermint and Natural Spearmint.

== Availability ==
=== United Kingdom ===
Rev7 launched in Spring 2012.

=== United States ===
Rev7 was on the US market from 4 October 2010 to December 2012, when it was withdrawn due to low sales.

It was available at multiple retailers, including 7-Eleven, Huck's Market, Mobil, BP and Weigel's, as well as Rev 7's online store.
