= Chewing gum =

Soft substance meant to be chewed without swallowing

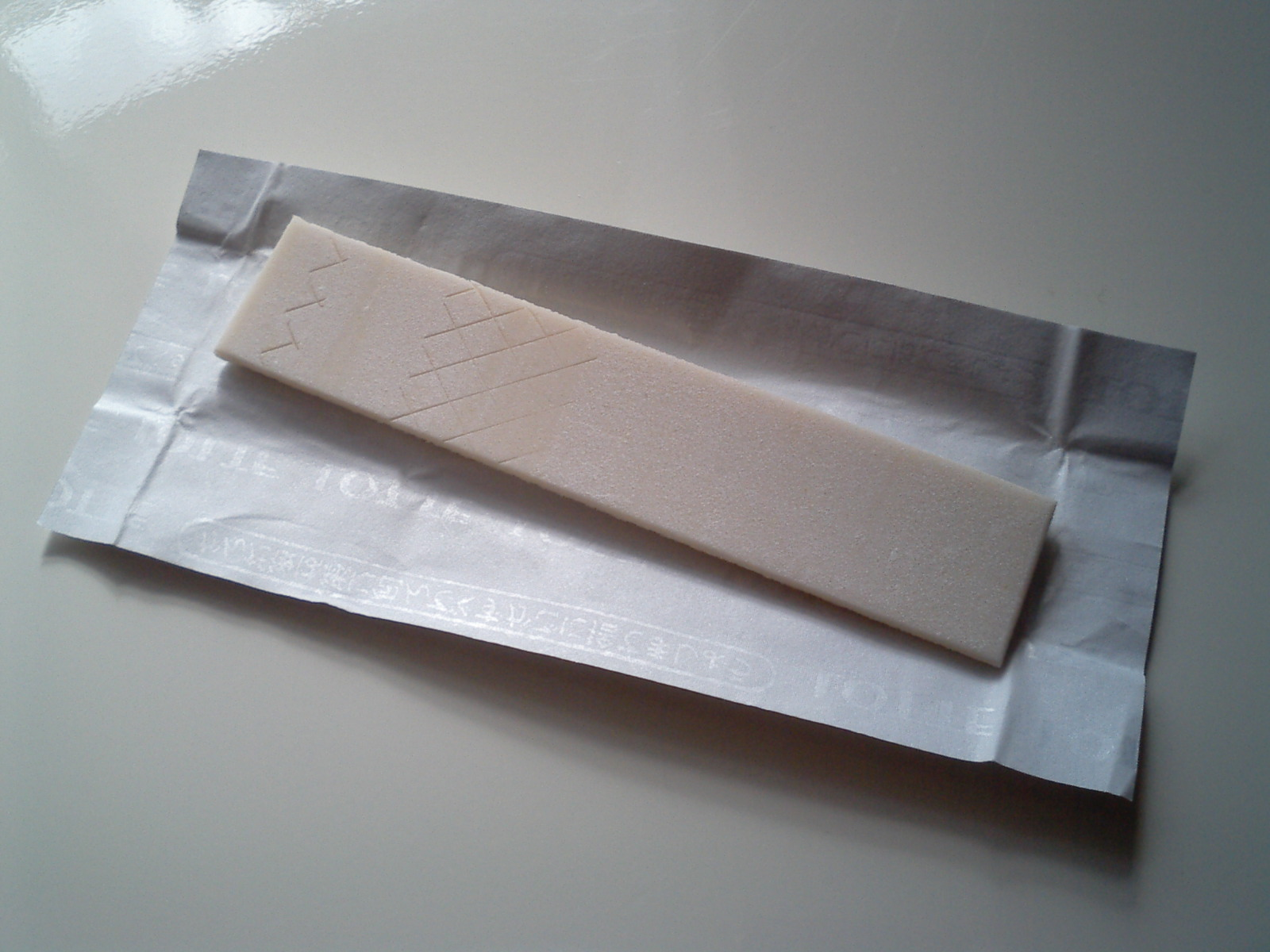
- An unwrapped stick of chewing gum
- Type: Confectionery
- Main ingredients: Gum base, sweeteners, plasticizers, flavors, colors, polyols

Chewing gum is a soft, cohesive substance designed to be chewed without being swallowed. Modern chewing gum is composed of gum base, sweeteners, softeners/plasticizers, flavors, colors, and, typically, a hard or powdered polyol coating. Its texture is reminiscent of rubber because of the physical-chemical properties of its polymer, plasticizer, and resin components, which contribute to its elastic-plastic, sticky, chewy characteristics.

== History ==
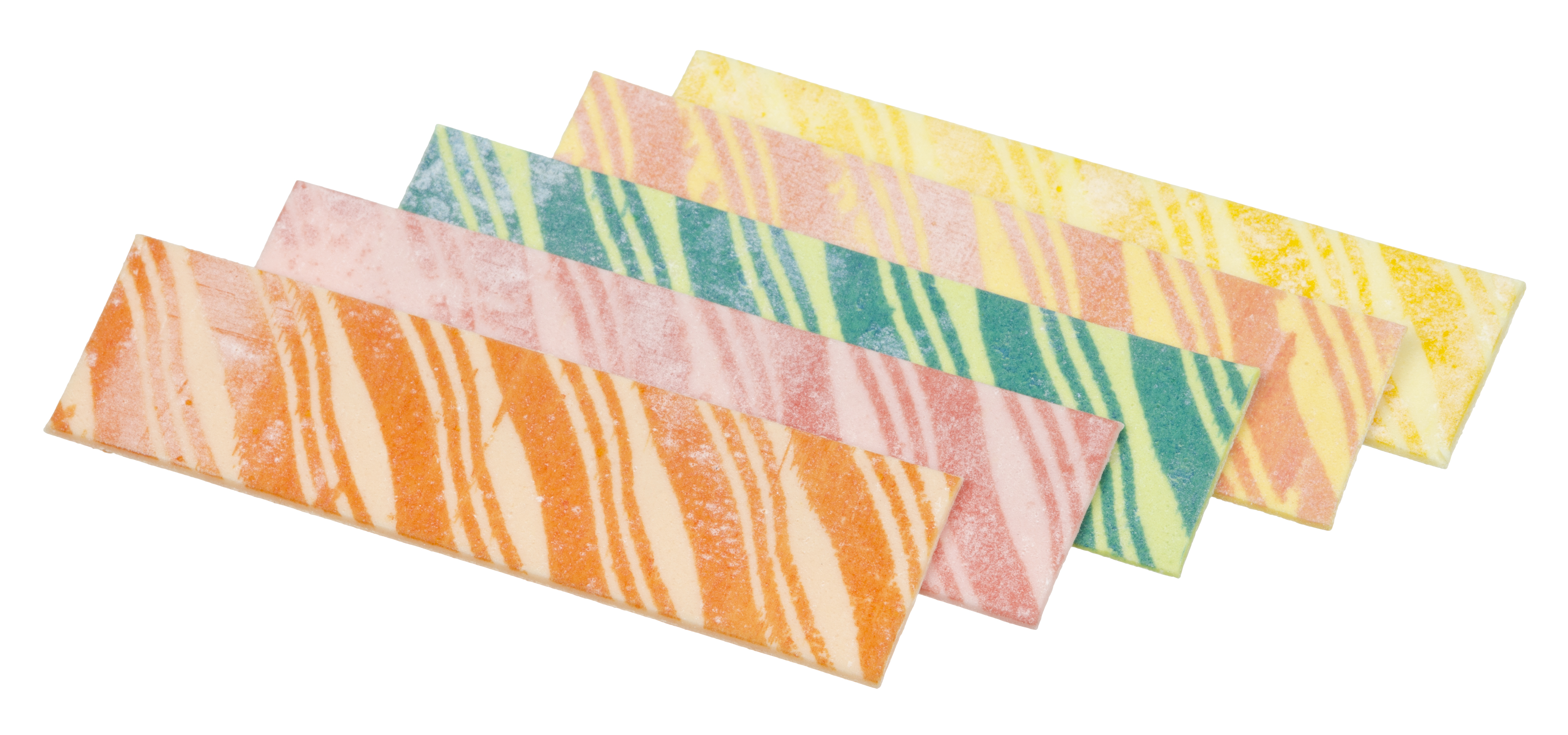
Sticks of Fruit Stripe chewing gum

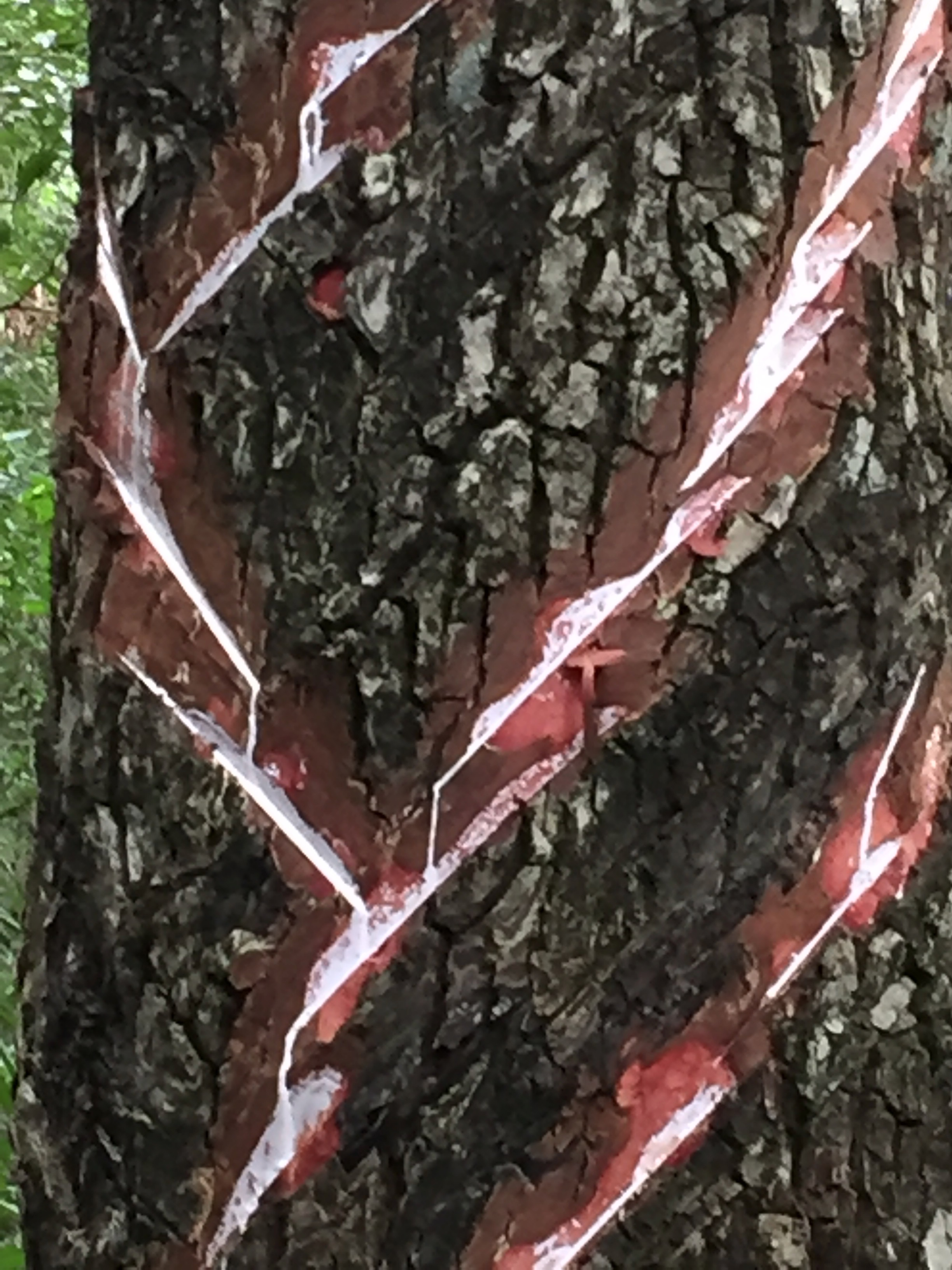
Traditional extraction of chicle from chicozapote tree (Achras zapota) in Quintana Roo, Mexico. This way of extracting by making zigzag incisions has been known since the ancient Mayan civilization, who called it sicté.

The cultural tradition of chewing gum seems to have developed through a convergent evolution process, as traces of this habit have arisen separately in many early civilizations. Each early precursor to chewing gum was derived from natural growths local to the region and was chewed purely out of the instinctual desire to masticate. Early chewers did not necessarily desire to derive nutritional benefits from their chewable substances but at times sought taste stimuli and teeth cleaning or breath-freshening capabilities.

Chewing gum in many forms has existed since the Neolithic period. 5,000-year-old chewing gum made from birch bark tar, with tooth imprints, has been found in Kierikki in Finland. The tar from which the gums were made is believed to have antiseptic properties and other medicinal benefits. It is chemically similar to petroleum tar and is in this way different from most other early gum. The Mayans and Aztecs were the first to exploit the positive properties of gum; they used chicle, a natural tree gum, as a base for making a gum-like substance and to stick objects together in everyday use. Forms of chewing gum were also chewed in Ancient Greece. The Ancient Greeks chewed mastic gum, made from the resin of the mastic tree. Mastic gum, like birch bark tar, has antiseptic properties and is believed to have been used to maintain oral health. Both chicle and mastic are tree resins. Many other cultures have chewed gum-like substances made from plants, grasses, and resins.

Variations of early chewing gum worldwide
Ancient civilization	Chewing gum precursor
Ancient Greece	Mastic (plant resin)
Ancient Maya	Chicle
Ancient Horn of Africa and Yemen	Khat
Chinese	Ginseng plant roots
Inuit	Blubber
Native Americans	Sugar pine and spruce sap
South Americans	Coca leaves
South Asia (India)	Betel nuts
Tropical West Africa	Kola nuts
United States (early settlers)	Tobacco leaves

Although chewing gum can be traced back to civilizations worldwide, the modernization and commercialization of this product mainly took place in the United States. The American Indians chewed resin made from the sap of spruce trees. The New England settlers picked up this practice, and in 1848, John B. Curtis developed and sold the first commercial chewing gum called The State of Maine Pure Spruce Gum. In this way, the industrializing West, having forgotten about tree gums, rediscovered chewing gum through the First Americans. Around 1850 a gum made from paraffin wax, a petroleum product, was developed and soon exceeded the spruce gum in popularity. To sweeten these early gums, the chewer would often make use of a plate of powdered sugar, which they would repeatedly dip the gum in to maintain sweetness. William F. Semple, a dentist from Mount Vernon, Ohio, filed an early patent on chewing gum, patent number 98,304, on 28 December 1869. Semple's gum was intended to clean the teeth and strengthen the chewer's jaw. It was not a sweet treat; ingredients included chalk and powdered licorice root. Charcoal was also suggested as a "suitable" ingredient in the patent.

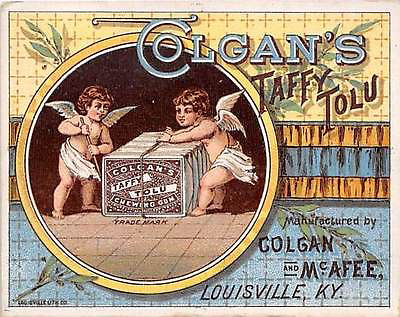
An image of a Colgan's Taffy Tolu Chewing Gum chromolithograph advertisement, c. 1910

The first flavored chewing gum was created in the 1860s by John Colgan, a Louisville, Kentucky, pharmacist. Colgan mixed with powdered sugar the aromatic flavoring tolu, a powder obtained from an extract of the balsam tree (Myroxylon), creating small sticks of flavored chewing gum he named "Taffy Tolu". Colgan also led the way in the manufacturing and packaging of chicle-based chewing gum, derived from Manilkara chicle, a tropical evergreen tree. He licensed a patent for automatically cutting chips of chewing gum from larger sticks: US 966,160 "Chewing Gum Chip Forming Machine" 2 August 1910 and a patent for automatically cutting wrappers for sticks of chewing gum: US 913,352 "Web-cutting attachment for wrapping-machines" 23 February 1909 from Louisville, Kentucky, inventor James Henry Brady, an employee of the Colgan Gum Company.

Modern chewing gum was first developed in the 1860s when chicle was brought from Mexico by the former president, General Antonio Lopez de Santa Anna, to New York, where he gave it to Thomas Adams for use as a rubber substitute. Chicle did not succeed as a replacement for rubber, but as a gum cut into strips and marketed as Adams New York Chewing Gum in 1871. Black Jack (1884), which is flavored with licorice, Chiclets (1899), and Wrigley's Spearmint Gum were early popular gums that quickly dominated the market and are all still around today. Chewing gum gained worldwide popularity through American GIs in WWII, who were supplied chewing gum as a ration and traded it with locals. Synthetic gums were first introduced to the U.S. after chicle no longer satisfied the needs of making good chewing gum. By the 1960s, US manufacturers had switched to butadiene-based synthetic rubber, as it was cheaper to manufacture. In the United States, chewing gum experienced a decline in popularity in the early 21st century, as it lost its association with counterculture and teenage rebelliousness. Others blamed smartphones reducing impulse purchases at the checkout.

Demand for chewing gum also declined during the COVID-19 pandemic, as people were less concerned about bad breath and impulse purchases also declined; U.S. sales of gum fell about 30 percent. While demand was back up to the pre-pandemic level in 2023 in dollar terms, this was the result of price increases, as the average price of a pack increased from $1.70 in 2018 to $2.71 in 2023. Globally, sales were down 10 percent from 2018.

== Ingredient composition ==
Gum base composition is considered proprietary information known by select individuals within each gum-manufacturing company. Information about the other components of chewing gum are more accessible to the public and they are listed in Table 2.

Table 2: Common ingredients in the formulation of modern chewing gum

Ingredient	Percent (by weight) Composition	Functionality	Common examples	
Gum Base	25–35%	Although the formulation of gum bases is considered proprietary information for industry competitors, three main components make up all gum bases: resin, wax, and elastomer. Resin (ex. terpene) is the main chewable portion. Wax softens the gum. Elastomers add flexibility. The molecular composition of gum base is very similar to that of plastics and rubbers.	Natural or synthetic ingredients (See Table 3)	
Sweeteners	Sugar alcohols: 40–50% Artificial Sweeteners: 0.05–0.5%	Bulk Polyol Sweeteners are responsible for initial sweetness, whereas intensive sweeteners are intended for prolonging the sweetness effect. Intensive Sweeteners are often encapsulated to delay the release of flavor.	Bulk polyol sweeteners: sugar, dextrose, glucose or corn syrup, erythritol, isomalt, xylitol, maltitol, mannitol, sorbitol, lactitol	Intensive sweeteners: aspartame, acesulfame-K, saccharine, sucralose, neohesperidine, dihydrichalcone
Glycerine	2–15%	To maintain moistness		
Softener/Plasticizer	1–2%	To soften gum by increasing flexibility and reducing brittleness by altering the glass transition temperature. Quantities of this additive are altered to balance processability and packaging speed.	lecithin, hydrogenated vegetable oils, glycerol ester, lanolin, methyl ester, pentaerythritol ester, rice bran wax, stearic acid, sodium and potassium stearates	
Flavors	1.5–3.0%	For taste and sensory appeal. Flavor components in gum exist in liquid, powder or micro-encapsulated forms. Liquid flavor incorporations are either water-soluble, oil-soluble, or water-dispersible emulsions. The oil-soluble flavors remain in the gum longer, resulting in longer lasting flavor sensations, because the gum base is hydrophobic and attracted to oil-based components.	Natural or synthetic Peppermint and spearmint are the most popular flavors. Food acids are implemented to provide a sour flavor (i.e. citric, tartaric, malic, lactic, adipic, and fumaric acids).	
Colors	Variable	For visual appeal	Natural or synthetic	
Polyol coating	Variable	Pellet gum's characteristic hard outer shell is due to a polyol coating. Polyols can also be implemented as a water absorbent powder dusting to maintain the quality and extend the shelf life of the product. These humectants bind water by establishing many hydrogen bonds with water molecules.	Sorbitol Maltitol/Isomalt Mannitol Starch	

=== Gum base ===
Gum base is made of polymers, plasticizers, and resins. Polymers, including elastomers, are responsible for the stretchy and sticky nature of chewing gum. Plasticizers improve flexibility and reduce brittleness, contributing to the plastic and elastic nature of gum. The interactions of plasticizers within gum base are governed by solubility parameters, molecular weight, and chemical structure. Resins compose the hydrophobic portion of the gum base, responsible for its chewiness. Although the exact ingredients and proportions used in each brand's gum base are trade secrets within the gum industry, Table 3 lists all of the natural and synthetic gum base components approved for use in the United States, demonstrating some examples of key gum base components.

Table 3: Gum base ingredients approved for use by the U.S. Food and Drug Administration (2016)

Natural ingredients	Synthetic ingredients
Sapotaceae Chicle Chiquibul Crown gum Gutta hang kang Massaranduba balata Massaranduba chocolate Nispero Rosidinha Venezuelan chicle	Butadiene-styrene rubber Isobutylene-isoprene copolymer (butyl rubber) Paraffin (via the Fischer–Tropsch process) Petroleum wax Petroleum wax synthetic Polyethylene Polyisobutylene Polyvinyl acetate
Apocynaceae Jelutong Leche caspi (sorva) Pendare Perillo	Butadiene-styrene rubber Isobutylene-isoprene copolymer (butyl rubber) Paraffin (via the Fischer–Tropsch process) Petroleum wax Petroleum wax synthetic Polyethylene Polyisobutylene Polyvinyl acetate
Moraceae Leche de vaca Niger gutta Tunu (tuno)	Butadiene-styrene rubber Isobutylene-isoprene copolymer (butyl rubber) Paraffin (via the Fischer–Tropsch process) Petroleum wax Petroleum wax synthetic Polyethylene Polyisobutylene Polyvinyl acetate
Euphorbiaceae Chilte Natural rubber	Butadiene-styrene rubber Isobutylene-isoprene copolymer (butyl rubber) Paraffin (via the Fischer–Tropsch process) Petroleum wax Petroleum wax synthetic Polyethylene Polyisobutylene Polyvinyl acetate

== Manufacturing process ==
First, gum base is previously prepared through a melting and straining or filtering process. The formulation for gum base is proprietary information known to few individuals within each gum-producing company. Next, other ingredients such as nutritive and non-nutritive sweeteners and flavors are added to the gum base until the warm mixture thickens like dough. The gum base mixture is heated during this mixing process to increase the entropy of the polymers to achieve a more uniform dispersion of ingredients. Then, extrusion technology is implemented to smooth, form, and shape the gum. Next, the gum goes through a shaping process that is determined by gum type and consumer demand. For example, cut and wrap (chunk or cube) pieces are severed straight out of the extruder using a vertical cutter. Sheeting is a technique often used for stick, slab and tab gums. Next, gum is either conditioned by being sprinkled with a powdered polyol or coated via the application of subsequent layers of coating using temperature controlled coating basins before it is sent to packaging.

=== Product varieties ===
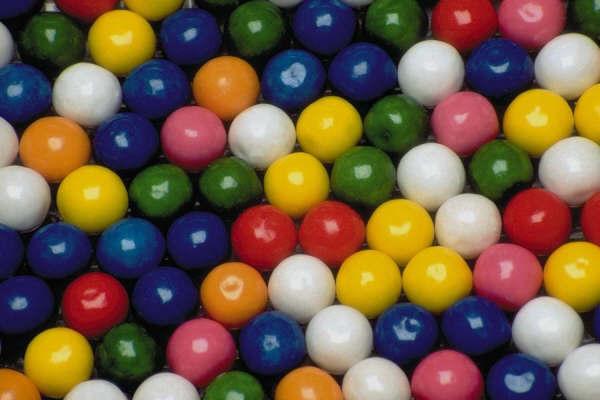
Chewing gum balls

Chewing gum can come in a variety of formats ranging from 1.4 to 6.9 grams per piece, and products can be differentiated by the consumers' intent to form bubbles or the sugar/sugarless dichotomy.

Chewing gum typically comes in three formats: tablets, coated pellets, and sticks/ slabs. Bubble gum typically come in three formats as well: tablets, hollow balls, and cubes or chunks. Stick, slab, and tab gums typically come in packs of about five to 17 sticks or more, and their medium size allows for softer texture. Pellet gums, or dragée gums, are pillow shaped pieces that are almost always coated. Packaging of pellet gums can vary from boxes to bottles to blister packs. The coating of pellet gum allows for the opportunity for multiple flavor sensations, since coating is done in a layering process and different flavor attributes can be added to various layers. Cube or chunk gums, which are typically intended for bubble blowing, are called cut and wrap gums as they are typically severed from continuous strands of extruded gum and packaged directly.

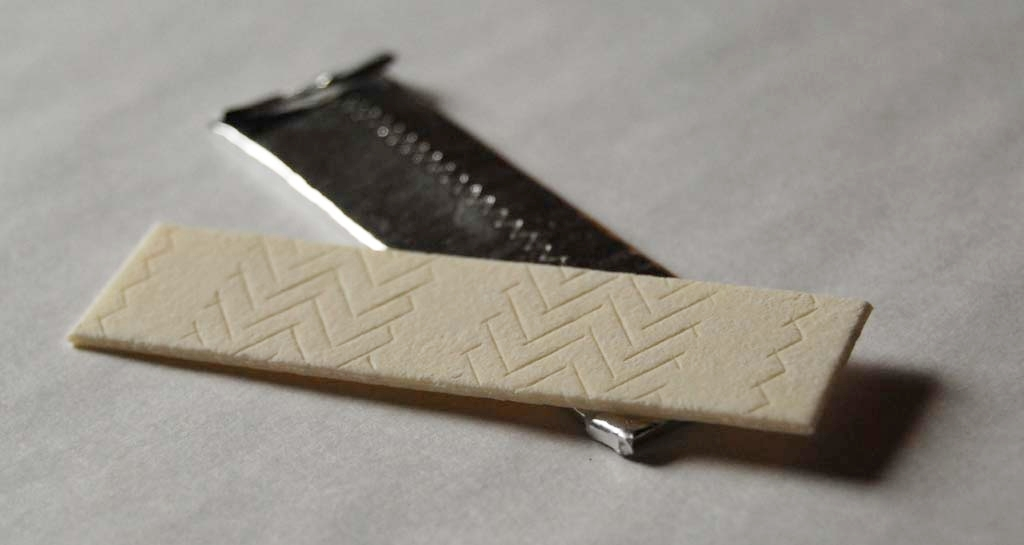
Stick

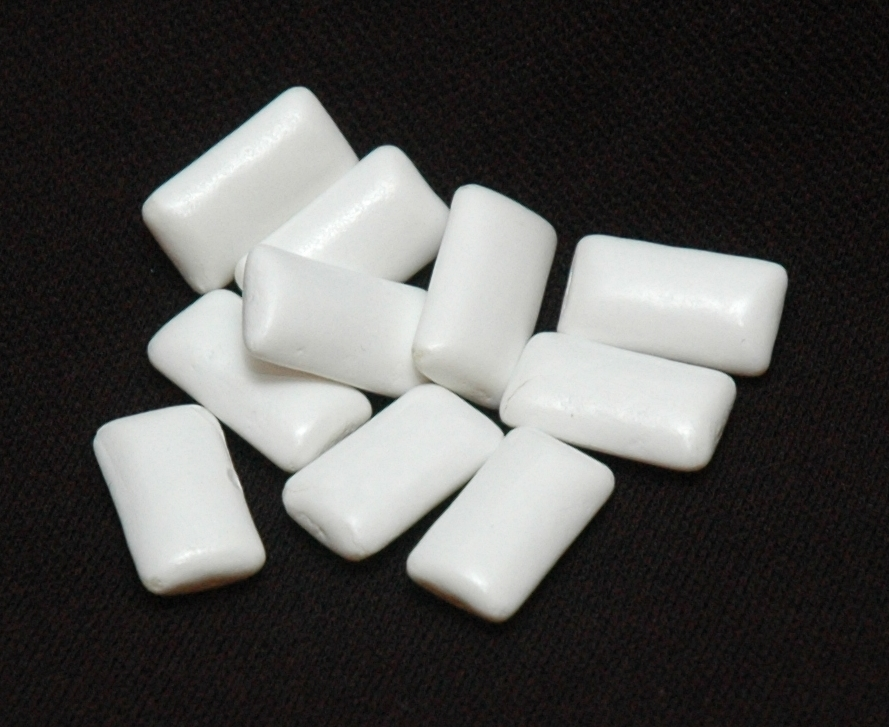
Coated pellets

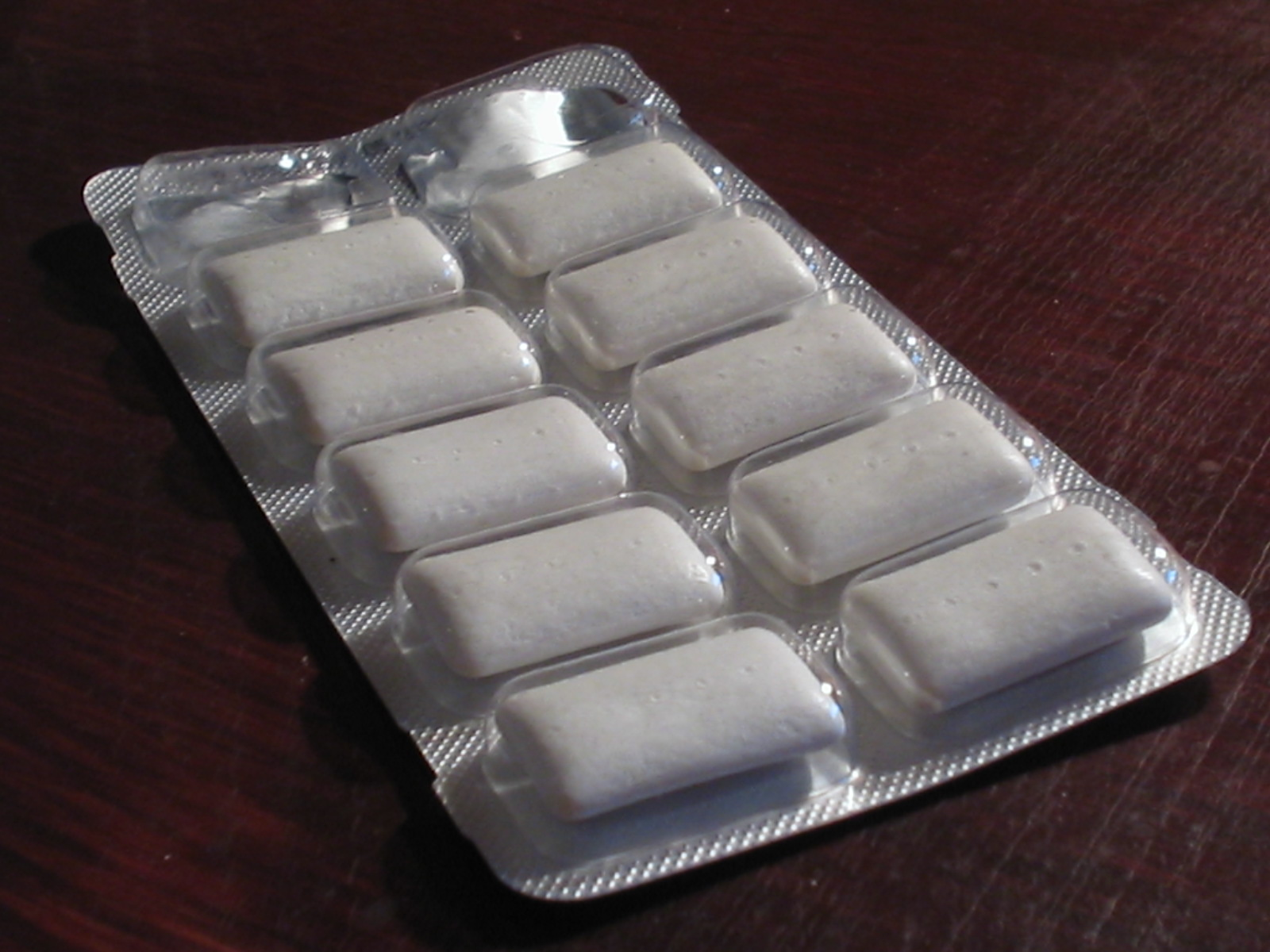
Uncoated

=== Quality and safety ===
Chewing gum is rather shelf stable because of its non-reactive nature and low moisture content. The water activity of chewing gum ranges from 0.40 to 0.65. The moisture content of chewing gum ranges from three to six percent. In fact, chewing gum retains its quality for so long that, in most countries, it is not required by law to be labeled with an expiration date. If chewing gum remains in a stable environment, over time the gum may become brittle or lose some of its flavor, but it will never be unsafe to eat. If chewing gum is exposed to moisture, over time water migration may occur, making the gum soggy. In lollipops with a gum center, water migration can lead to the end of the product's shelf life, as it causes the exterior hard candy shell to soften and the interior gum center to harden.

== Physical and chemical characteristics ==
The physical and chemical properties of chewing gum impact all aspects of this product, from manufacturing to sensory perception during mastication.

=== Chewiness ===
The polymers that make up the main component of chewing gum base are hydrophobic. This property is essential because it allows for retention of physical properties throughout the mastication process. Because the polymers of gum repel water, the water-based saliva system in a consumer's mouth will dissolve the sugars and flavorings in chewing gum, but not the gum base itself. This allows for gum to be chewed for a long time without breaking down in the mouth like conventional foods. Chewing gum can be classified as a product containing a liquid phase and a crystalline phase, providing gum with its characteristic balance of plastic and elastic properties.

=== Stickiness ===
While hydrophobic polymers beneficially repel water and contribute to chewiness, they also detrimentally attract oil. The stickiness of gum results from this hydrophobic nature, as gum can form bonds and stick when it makes contact with oily surfaces such as sidewalks, skin, hair, or the sole of one's shoe. To make matters worse, unsticking the gum is a challenge because the long polymers of the gum base stretch, rather than break. The sticky characteristic of gum may be problematic during processing if the gum sticks to any machinery or packaging materials during processing, impeding the flow of product. Aside from ensuring that the machinery is free from lipid-based residues, this issue can be combatted by the conditioning and coating of gum toward the end of the process. By adding either a powder or a coating to the exterior of the gum product, the hydrophobic gum base binds to the added substance instead of various surfaces with which it may come in contact.

=== Bubble-blowing capability ===
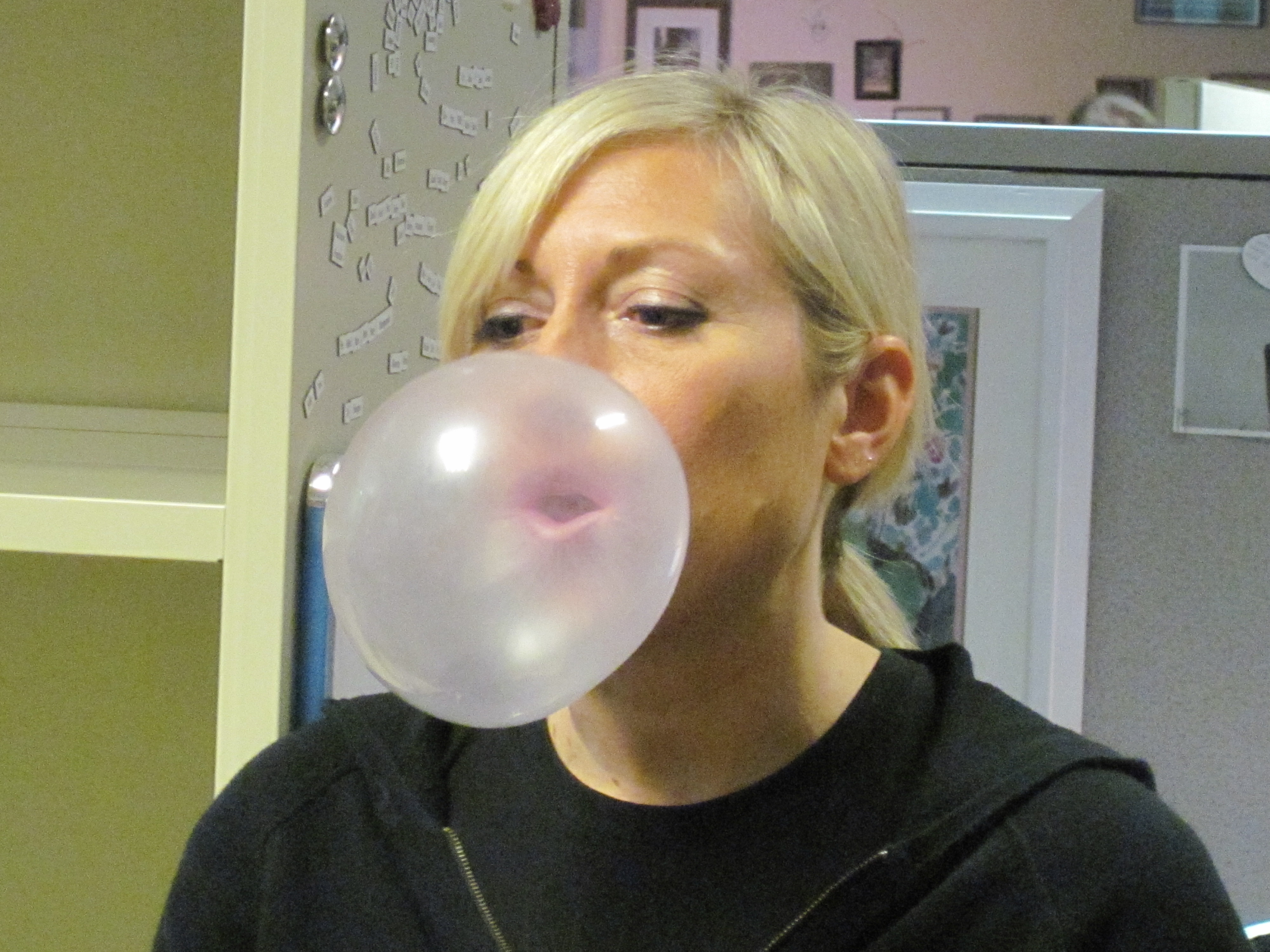
Bubblegum bubble

Bubblegum bubbles are formed when the tension and elasticity of gum polymers acts against the constant and equally dispersed pressure of air being directed into the gum bolus. Bubble gum bubbles are circular because pressure from the focused air being directed into the bolus acts equally on all of the interior surfaces of the gum cud, uniformly pushing outward on all surfaces as the polymers extend. As the bubble expands, the polymers of the gum base stretch and the surface of the bubble begins to thin. When the force of the air being blown into the bubble exceeds the force that the polymers can withstand, the polymers overextend and the bubble pops. Due to the elastic attributes of chewing gum, the deflated bubble recoils and the wad of gum is ready to continue being chewed.

Gum bases with higher molecular weights are typically used in gums intended to meet bubble-forming expectations. Higher molecular weight gum bases include longer polymers that are able to stretch further, and thus are able to form larger bubbles that retain their shape for a longer time.

=== Flavor release ===
Flavor delivery is extended throughout the mastication process by timed release of different flavor components due to the physical-chemical properties of many of chewing gum's ingredients. During the first three to four minutes of the chew, bulking agents such as sugar or sorbitol and maltitol have the highest solubility and, therefore, are chewed out first. As these components dissolve in the consumers' saliva and slide down the esophagus, they are no longer retained in the gum base or perceived by the chewer. During the next phase of the chew in the four to six-minute range, intense sweeteners and some acids are dissolved and chewed out. These components last slightly longer than the bulking agents because they have a slightly lower solubility. Next, encapsulated flavors are released during either 10–15 minutes into the chew or after 30–45 minutes. Encapsulated flavors remain incorporated in the gum base longer because the molecules that they are encapsulated in are more easily held within the gum matrix. Finally, during the last phase of the chew, softeners such as corn syrup and glycerin and other textural modifiers are dissolved, resulting in a firming up of the gum and the end of the chew.

Studies have shown that gum flavor is perceived better in the presence of sweetener. Companies have started to create chemical systems in gum so that the sweetener and flavor release together in a controlled manner during chewing.

=== Cooling sensation ===
A cooling sensation is achieved through the chemical phenomenon of the negative enthalpy of dissolution that occurs with bulk sweeteners, such as the sugar alcohols. The enthalpy of dissolution refers to the overall amount of heat that is absorbed or released in the dissolving process. Because the bulk sweeteners absorb heat as they dissolve and have a negative enthalpy, they yield a cooling sensation as they are dissolved in a consumer's saliva.

== Health effects ==
=== Brain function ===
A review about the cognitive advantages of chewing gum by Onyper et al. (2011) found strong evidence of improvement for the following cognitive domains: working memory, episodic memory and speed of perception. However the improvements were only evident when chewing took place prior to cognitive testing. The precise mechanism by which gum chewing improves cognitive functioning is however not well understood. The researchers did also note that chewing-induced arousal could be masked by the distracting nature of chewing itself, which they named "dual-process theory", which in turn could explain some of the contradictory findings by previous studies. They also noticed the similarity between mild physical exercise such as pedaling a stationary bike and chewing gum. It has been demonstrated that mild physical exercise leads to little cognitive impairment during the physical task accompanied by enhanced cognitive functioning afterwards. Furthermore, the researchers noted that no improvement could be found for verbal fluency, which is in accordance with previous studies. This finding suggests that the effect of chewing gum is domain specific. The cognitive improvements after a period of chewing gum have been demonstrated to last for 15–20 minutes and decline afterwards.

=== Dental health ===
Sugar-free gum sweetened with xylitol has been shown to reduce cavities and plaque. The sweetener sorbitol has the same benefit, but is only about one-third as effective as xylitol. Other sugar substitutes, such as maltitol, aspartame and acesulfame K, have also been found to not cause tooth decay. Xylitol is specific in its inhibition of Streptococcus mutans, bacteria that are significant contributors to tooth decay. Xylitol inhibits Streptococcus mutans in the presence of other sugars, with the exception of fructose. Xylitol is a safe sweetener that benefits teeth and saliva production because, unlike most sugars, it is not fermented to acid. Daily doses of xylitol below 3.44 grams are ineffective and doses above 10.32 grams show no additional benefit. Other active ingredients in chewing gum include fluoride, which strengthens tooth enamel, and p-chlorbenzyl-4-methylbenzylpiperazine, which prevents travel sickness. Chewing gum also increases saliva production.

Food and sucrose have a demineralizing effect upon enamel that has been reduced by adding calcium lactate to food. Calcium lactate added to toothpaste has reduced calculus formation. One study has shown that calcium lactate enhances enamel remineralization when added to xylitol-containing gum, but another study showed no additional remineralization benefit from calcium lactate or other calcium compounds in chewing-gum.

Other studies indicated that the caries preventive effect of chewing sugar-free gum is related to the chewing process itself rather than being an effect of gum sweeteners or additives, such as polyols and carbamide. A study investigating the in situ effect of casein phosphopeptide–amorphous calcium phosphate (CPP–ACP) found that its incorporation into a sugar-free gum increases the remineralization / protection of eroded enamel surface significantly.

Gum chewing is regarded as a helpful way to cure halitosis (bad breath). Chewing gum not only helps to add freshness to breath but can aid in removing food particles and bacteria associated with bad breath from teeth. It does this by stimulating saliva, which essentially washes out the mouth. Chewing sugar-free gum for 20 minutes after a meal helps prevent tooth decay, according to the American Dental Association, because the act of chewing the sugar-free gum produces saliva to wash away bacteria, which protects teeth. Chewing gum can also help with the lack of saliva or xerostomia since it naturally stimulates saliva production. Saliva can also promote enamel remineralization as long as it does not become too acidic.

Masumoto et al. looked at the effects of chewing gum after meals following an orthodontic procedure, to see if chewing exercises caused subjects pain or discomfort, or helped maintain a large occlusal contact area. 35 adult volunteers chewed gum for 10 to 15 minutes before or after three meals each day for 4 weeks. 90% of those questioned said that the gum felt "quite hard", and half reported no discomfort.

=== Use in surgery ===
Several randomized controlled studies have investigated the use of chewing gum in reducing the duration of post-operative ileus following abdominal and specifically gastrointestinal surgery. A systematic review of these suggests gum chewing, as a form of "sham feeding", is a useful treatment therapy in open abdominal or pelvic surgery, although the benefit is less clear when laparoscopic surgical techniques are used.

Chewing gum after a colon surgery helps the patient recover sooner. If the patient chews gum for fifteen minutes for at least four times per day, it will reduce their recovery time by a day and a half. The average patient took 0.66 fewer days to pass gas and 1.10 fewer days to have a bowel movement. Saliva flow and production is stimulated when gum is chewed. Gum also gets digestive juices flowing and is considered "sham feeding". Sham feeding is the role of the central nervous system in the regulation of gastric secretion.

=== Use in cardiovascular disease ===
Chewing gum has been shown to be effective in relieving the symptom of thirst in patients living with heart failure.

=== Stomach ===
Chewing gum is used as a novel approach for the treatment of gastroesophageal reflux disease (GERD). One hypothesis is that chewing gum stimulates the production of more bicarbonate-containing saliva and increases the rate of swallowing. After the saliva is swallowed, it neutralizes acid in the esophagus. In effect, chewing gum exaggerates one of the normal processes that neutralize acid in the esophagus. However, chewing gum is sometimes considered to contribute to the development of stomach ulcers. It stimulates the stomach to secrete acid and the pancreas to produce digestive enzymes that aren't required. In some cases, when consuming large quantities of gum containing sorbitol, gas and/or diarrhea may occur.

=== Microplastics ===
Chewing gum releases microplastics and nanoplastics into saliva as it is being chewed, and these particles enter the body when that saliva is swallowed. Multiple potential heath risks have been identified from ingestion of microplastics, but the full effects on human health are still under investigation.

== Controversies ==
=== Classification as food ===
Controversy arises as to health concerns surrounding the questionable classification of gum as food, particularly in regard to some alternative uses for gum base ingredients. According to the U.S. Food and Drug Administration (FDA), chewing gum is considered a food, as the term "food" means "a raw, cooked, or processed edible substance, ice, beverage, or ingredient used or intended for use or for sale in whole or in part for human consumption, or chewing gum". Chewing gum is defined as a food of minimal nutritional value. However, many of the ingredients in gum base have uses in inedible products, which raises concern in some consumers. Polyethylene, one of the most popular components of gum base, belongs to a common group of plastics and is used in products from plastic bags to hula hoops. Polyvinyl acetate is a sticky polymer found in white glue. Butyl rubber is typically used in caulking and the lining of car tires, in addition to its role in gum base. Paraffin wax is a byproduct of refined petroleum.

=== Possible carcinogens ===
Concern has arisen about the possible carcinogenicity of the vinyl acetate (acetic acid ethenyl ester) used by some manufacturers in their gum bases. Currently, the ingredient can be hidden in the catch-all term "gum base". The Canadian government at one point classified the ingredient as a "potentially high hazard substance." However, on 31 January 2010, the Government of Canada's final assessment concluded that exposure to vinyl acetate is not considered to be harmful to human health. This decision under the Canadian Environmental Protection Act (CEPA) was based on new information received during the public comment period, as well as more recent information from the risk assessment conducted by the European Union.

=== Choking and excretion of swallowed gum ===
Various myths hold that swallowed gum will remain in a human's stomach for up to seven years, as it is not digestible. According to several medical opinions, there seems to be little truth behind the tale. In most cases, swallowed gum will pass through the system as quickly as any other food.

There have been cases where swallowing gum has resulted in complications in young children requiring medical attention. A 1998 paper describes a four-year-old boy being referred with a two-year history of constipation. The boy was found to have "always swallowed his gum after chewing five to seven pieces each day", being given the gum as a reward for good behavior, and the build-up resulted in a solid mass which could not leave the body. A 1½-year-old girl required medical attention when she swallowed her gum and four coins, which got stuck together in her esophagus. A bezoar is formed in the stomach when food or other foreign objects stick to gum and build up, causing intestinal blockage. As long as the mass of gum is small enough to pass out of the stomach, it will likely pass out of the body easily, but it is recommended that gum not be swallowed or given to young children who do not understand not to swallow it.

Adults have choked to death on chewing gum in rare cases. A 2012 report describes a 42-year-old woman who fell on the stairs while chewing gum. Due to the impact, the gum fell into the pharynx and was inhaled into the larynx, causing complete blockage and resulting in the woman's death by asphyxiation.

=== Environmental effects ===
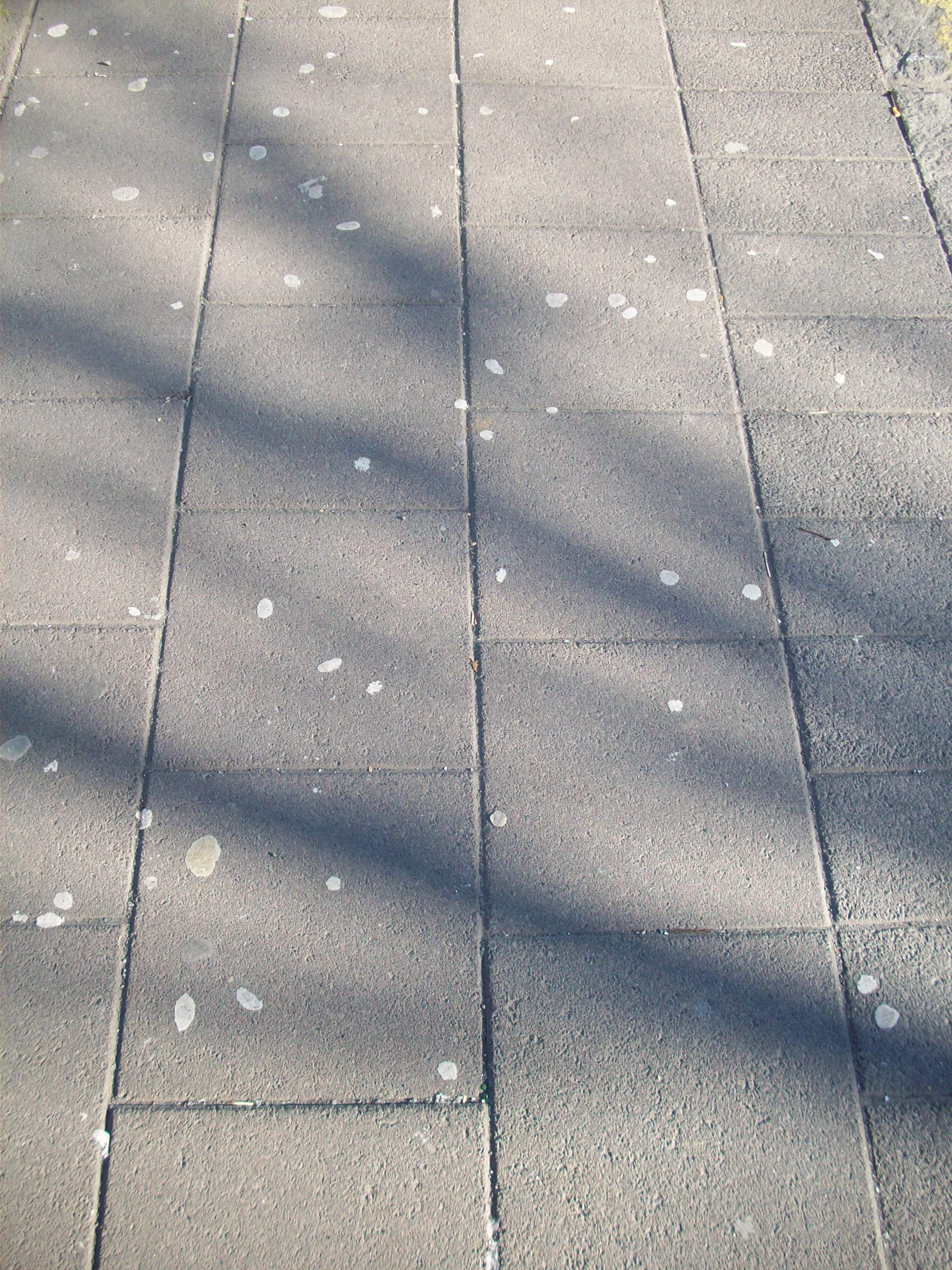
Chewing gum on a sidewalk in Reykjavík

Chewing gum is not water-soluble and unlike other confectionery is not fully consumed. There has been much effort at public education and investment aimed at encouraging responsible disposal. Despite this it is commonly found stuck underneath benches, tables, handrails and escalators. It is extremely difficult and expensive to remove once "walked in" and dried. Gum bonds strongly to asphalt and rubber shoe soles because they are all made from polymeric hydrocarbons. It also bonds strongly with concrete paving. Removal is generally achieved by steam jet and scraper but the process is slow and labour-intensive.

Most external urban areas with high pedestrian traffic show high incidence of casual chewing gum discard. In 2000 a study on Oxford Street, one of London's busiest shopping streets, showed that a quarter of a million black or white blobs of chewing gum were stuck to its pavement. Gum removal from city streets, or even famous landmarks, can be a costly effort; in Rome, 15,000 pieces of chewed gum are discarded on a daily basis and the removal of each piece costs the city one euro. However, likely as a consequence of Singapore's ban, Singapore's pavements are, perhaps uniquely amongst modern cities, free of gum.

Various teams of researchers have developed gum that is less adhesive and degrades within days or weeks. One example, Rev7 Gum, was briefly for sale from 2010 to 2012.

=== Bans ===
Many schools do not allow chewing gum because students often dispose of it inappropriately (leaving it under desks and chairs, behind vending machines, etc.). The chewing may also pose a distraction to class, and the gum might carry diseases or bacteria from other students.

The Singapore government outlawed chewing gum in 1992 citing the danger of discarded gum being wedged in the sliding doors of MRT trains and general cleanliness. However, in 2004 the government allowed sugarless gum to be sold in pharmacies if a doctor or dentist prescribed it due to the Singapore–United States Free Trade Agreement.

== Recycling ==
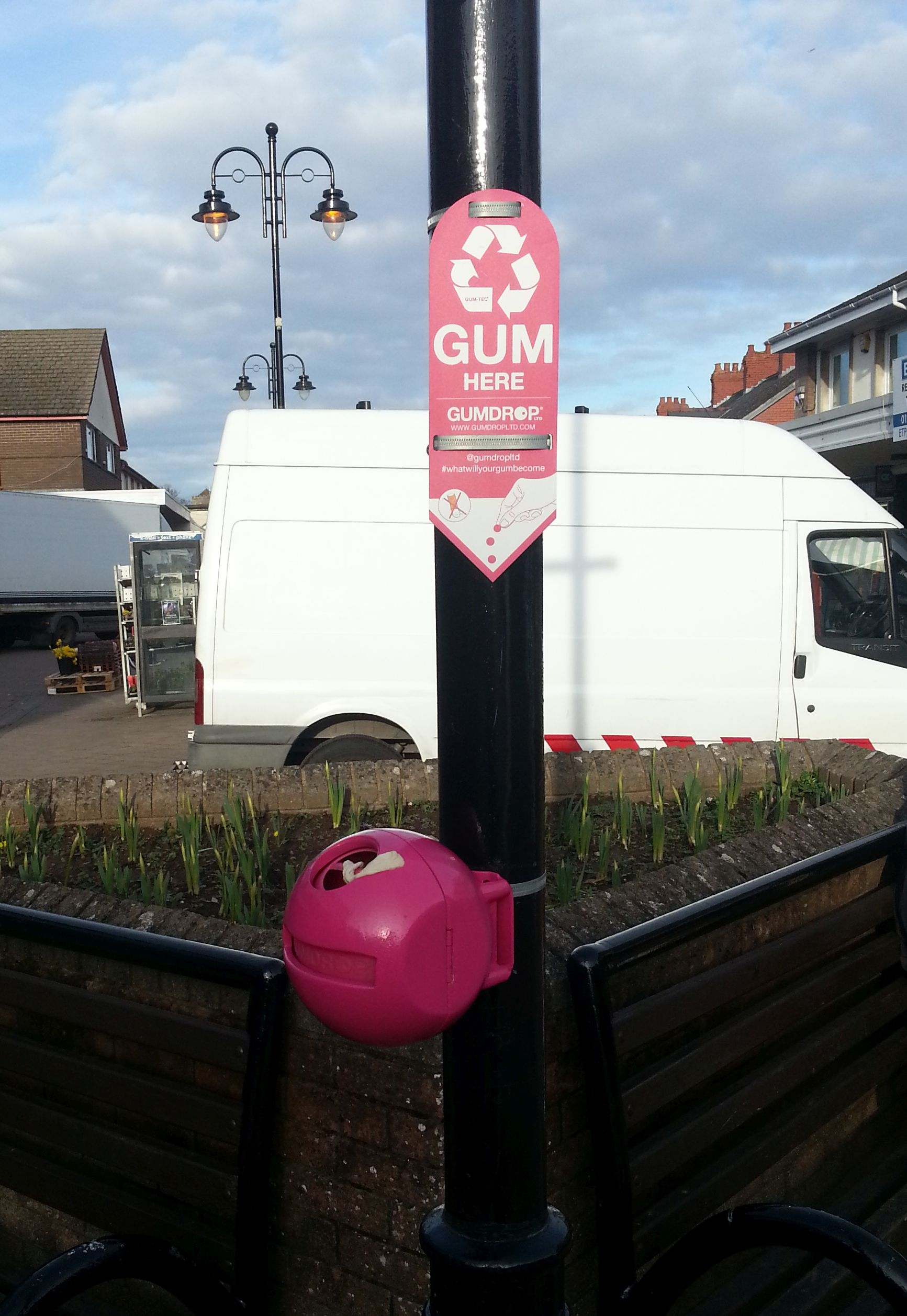
Gumdrop chewing gum collecting bin

In 2018, the BBC published a news article on British designer Anna Bullus, who created a method of collecting and recycling chewing gum into plastic, noting that litter from chewing gum is the second most common form of litter, second only to cigarette litter. She uses a Worcester recycling plant to make old chewing gum into plastic. She then uses that plastic at a plastic moulding specialist, Amber Valley, in Leicester to make plastic objects. Known objects made are collection containers for more chewing gum, shoe soles, rubber boots, and plastic cups. Her company advertises itself as the "first company in the world to recycle and process chewing gum into a range of new compounds that can be used in the rubber and plastics industry". The company is called Gum-tec, and the collection containers are dubbed "gumdrops". Advertised products on the website are pencils, coffee mugs, guitar picks, a "bicycle spoke", rulers, sports cones, frisbees, boomerangs, door stops, "meal mates", lunch-boxes, and combs.

== See also ==
- Bubble gum
- List of chewing gum brands
- Bubblegum Alley
- Gum Wall in Seattle
- Gum base
