= Sham feeding =

Procedure that mimics food consumption

Sham feeding is any procedure that mimics normal food consumption but where food and drink are not actually digested or absorbed. It is generally used in experiments studying hunger, eating or digestion, and is a predominant method used in studying binge eating disorder. In animal research it often involves inserting a tube into either the oesophagus or stomach, that leaks out anything that has been swallowed. Animals who are sham fed in this manner eat and swallow almost continually without becoming satiated. Chewing gum can also be considered sham feeding, as whilst very little or no nutrients are being absorbed into the body, the process of chewing still stimulates digestive system nerves which trigger the release of gastrointestinal hormones, and also increase the production of both saliva and pancreatic secretions. In human studies a process known as modified sham feeding (MSF) is typically used, which involves smelling, tasting and chewing food, then spitting it out when it would normally be swallowed.
