= Chewing gum industry =

Industry

Two multi-national companies, Wrigley and Cadbury, together account for some 60% market share of the worldwide chewing gum market. The global market shares for the top five chewing gum companies are estimated to be:

- 35% Wrigley Company (US)
- 26% Cadbury Trebor Bassett (UK)
- 14% Lotte (South Korea + Japan)
- 6% Perfetti Van Melle (Italy)
- 2% Hershey's (US)

The remaining 17% of the global market is provided by an estimated 200 to 250 smaller gum companies, some of which are listed below.

The worldwide chewing gum industry in 2012 is estimated to be worth $26 billion in sales, and has grown by more than 14% in the last three years.

Chewing gum accounts for 85% of global sales, and bubble gum the other 15%.

== History ==
- 1848: John B. Curtis developed "State of Maine Pure Spruce Gum"
- 1869: Mexican general, Antonio López de Santa Anna brought chicle from Mexico to New York
- 1872: Thomas Adams Jr. sold his brand "Adams New York No. 1" with a picture of New York's City Hall, two for a penny
- 1875: Adams adds shredded liquorice to his chicle mass and created the first known flavored gum – Adams’ Black Jack gum.
- 1880: William J. White added corn syrup, sugar and flavoring to his "Yucatan" brand
- 1881: Civil War doctor from Cleveland, Ohio, Dr. Edward E. Beeman, added pepsin compound as a digestive aid
- 1891: Wrigley Company (US) was established
- 1895: Henry Fleer, the brother of Frank H. Fleer, started the brand "Chiclets"
- 1899: William J. White, of Yucatan fame, started the merger of six manufacturers to form the American Chicle Co.
- 1899: Franklin V. Canning developed Dentyne a contraction of "dental hygiene" gum with pink-colored gum with a cinnamon flavor
- 189?: Frank E. Barbour started Beech-Nut gum
- 1906: Frank H. Fleer Co., introduced the first bubble gum, Blibber-Blubber.
- 1909: Dr. Louis A. Dreyfus formed the L.A. Dreyfus company
- 1915 Stimorol (Denmark) was established by Dandy
- 1916: Franklin V. Canning sold Dentyne trademark and process to the American Chicle Co.
- 1916: Wrigley Co. acquired a controlling interest in the L.A. Dreyfus Co. and, in 1935 became sole owner
- 1916: The Hershey Company enters the chewing gum business
- 1918: NACGM [National Association of Chewing Gum Manufacturers] (US) established
- 1919: Ford Gum & Machine (US) established by Ford Mason
- 1921: Clark Chewing Gum Co. of Pittsburgh started Teaberry, Tendermint, and Cinadent brands.
- 1921: Leaf Confectionery (US) established
- 1926: Richardson Brands (US) established
- 1928: Donruss (US) established
- 1928: Walter Diemer, at the Fleer Company, improved the quality of bubble gum "Dubble Bubble"
- 1937: White Laboratories introduced Aspergum, an analgesic gum. "Pheenamint", a laxative gum and Chooz, an antacid gum containing calcium carbonate.
- 1938: Topps (US) established
- 1946: Ambrogio and Egidio Perfetti, started Perfetti S.p.A. in Lainate, Italy
- 1948: The Japanese company, Lotte, began chewing gum operations
- 1948: Dr. Bruno Petrulis of Amurol Products Company developed a sugar-free chewing gum.
- 1948: Maple Leaf (Holland) established
- 1949: Claude E. Parfet formed Krema-Hollywood Chewing Gum in France.
- 1953: Topps (US) establishes the Bazooka bubble gum brand
- 196?: Vincent Ciccone of American Charms Co. conceives the idea of inserting a bubble gum filling in a ball lollipop named "Blo Pops"
- 1962: American Chicle Co. was acquired by the Warner-Lambert Pharmaceutical Co.
- 1964: American Chicle Co. introduced their first sugar-free chewing gum, Trident
- 1965: Damel (Spain) established
- 1971: Proaroma (Brazil) established
- 1974: Warner-Lambert launches "Freshen Up" liquid center filled gum.
- 1975: Life Savers established Bubble Yum
- 1977: Bubblicious established
- 1979: Hubba Bubba established by Wrigley
- 1979: Bubble Yum launches a sugarless version
- 1980: Big League Chew launched by Wrigley
- 1983: Huhtamäki (Finland) creates the Leaf Group gum & candy business through the US acquisitions of Leaf Confectionery, D. L. Clark Company, Richardson Brands and the Donruss division of General Mills
- 1985: Huhtamäki (Finland) acquires Ford Gum & Machine (US)
- 1988: Bubble Tape created by Amurol subsidiary of Wrigley
- 1989: EACGI [European Association of the Chewing Gum Industry] (Belgium) established
- 1992: Fleer acquired by Marvel Entertainment (comics publisher)
- 1993: Cadbury (UK) buys its first chewing gum business with the acquisition of Stani (Argentina)
- 1995: Fleer shuts down its Philadelphia plant and moves its corporate office to suburban Mount Laurel, New Jersey
- 1996: Topps (US) closes its bubble gum factories in Duryea, Pennsylvania (US) and Innishmore (Ireland) and out-sources its Bazooka bubble gum production to Hersheys (US)
- 1996: The Hershey Company (US) acquires Leaf's gum brands: Rain-Blo and Super Bubble
- 1997: Huhtamäki (Finland) acquires the gum business of the Wuxi Leaf joint-venture in China
- 1998: Huhtamäki (Finland) divests the Leaf (Spain) gum business to Damel
- 1998: Concord Confections buys Dubble Bubble from Marvel Entertainment and moves operations to suburban Toronto
- 1999: Zed Gum (Ireland) is established
- 1999: CSM (Netherlands) buys the Leaf Europe candy and gum business from Huhtamäki (Finland) for €390 million
- 2000: Cadbury (UK) buys Kraft's "Hollywood" chewing gum business in France for €185 million
- 2000: The Hershey Company (US) buys Fruit Stripe and Bubble Yum gum brands and mints from Nabisco (US)
- 2000: Cadbury (UK) buys the small Wuxi Leaf gum business in China from Huhtamäki (Finland) for only €3 million
- 2000: Concord Confections partners with Walmart and Children's Miracle Network to conduct a national bubble-blowing contest across America for children 12 and under (conducted annually until 2006)
- 2001: Perfetti (Italy) merges with Van Melle (Netherlands)
- 2002: Cadbury (UK) buys a 51% stake in the gum and candy business of Kent Gida (Turkey) for €110 million
- 2002: Zed Gum (Ireland) acquires Leaf (Ireland) from CSM and changes name to Zed Candy
- 2002: Cadbury (UK) buys Dandy's gum brands, mainly in Scandinavia & Russia for €310 million
- 2003: The Hershey Company (US) sells Fruit Stripe, Rain-Blo and Super Bubble gum brands to Farley's & Sathers Candy Co. (US)
- 2003: Concord Confections (Canada) acquires Philadelphia Chewing Gum (US) and moves production to suburban Toronto
- 2003: Cadbury (UK) buys the global gum business of the Adams gum division from Pfizer for $4.2 billion
- 2004: Wrigley Company (US) buys the Joyco gum and candy and Cafosa Gum Base business from Agrolimen (Spain) for $272 million
- 2004: Tootsie Roll Industries (US) acquires Concord Confections (Canada) for $197 million
- 2005: ICGA [International Chewing Gum Association] (Belgium) established by the merger of the NACGM and EACGI
- 2006: Cadbury (UK) invests €148 million to expand gum capacity in Poland and Mexico
- 2006: Cadbury (UK) buys the other 49% of Kent Gida (Turkey) for €80 million
- 2006: Perfetti Van Melle (Italy) buys candy and gum company Chupa Chups (Spain) for an estimated €400 million
- 2006: ZOFT Gum Company (US) established
- 2008: Mars Inc., makers of M&Ms, buys the Wm. Wrigley Jr. Co. and forms Mars-Wrigley]
- 2009: Vitamin Gum | Vitaball, Inc. (US)
- 2009: Chicza Organic chewing gum (MEX) launched in the UK and others countries of EU
- 2010: PÜR Gum (CA) established
- 2011: Ello Gum (US) established
- 2017: First Energy Holding B.V. (NL) established
- 2019: QUICK ENERGY Co.Ltd. (Czech Rep) established
- 2025: Perfetti Van Melle Group B.V. buys developed market gum business of Mondelez International, Inc.

== See also ==
- Bubble gum
- Chewing gum
- Functional chewing gum
- Gum base
- List of chewing gum brands
