= List of chewing gum brands =

Alphabetical listing of brand names and marketing regions

This is a list of chewing gum brands in the world. Chewing gum is a type of gum made for chewing, and dates back at least 5,000 years. Modern chewing gum was originally made of chicle, a natural latex. By the 1960s, chicle was replaced by butadiene-based synthetic rubber which is cheaper to manufacture. Most chewing gums are considered polymers. This list contains both chewing gum and bubblegum.

Key:

Flavour variant of gum

== 0-9 ==
Name	Image	Distribution	Manufacturer	Description	Ref
5		United States, Canada, Worldwide	Wrigley		

== A ==
Name	Image	Distribution	Manufacturer	Description	Ref
Action		IRAN	MasterFoodeh Co	Sugar free, Caffeine gum that contains 25 milligrams of caffeine with cool mint flavor.	
Airwaves		United Kingdom, Hong Kong, Europe, East Asia	Wrigley		
Alert		United States	Wrigley	Caffeine gum that contains 40 milligrams of caffeine which is the equivalent of half a cup of coffee. Has a bitter, medicinal taste.	
Alpine		United States	Wrigley		
Apollo Energy Gum®		United States, Sweden, Norway, Iceland, Denmark, Finland	Apollo Brands, LLC		

== B ==
Name	Image	Distribution	Manufacturer	Description	Ref
Babble Joe		Philippines	Rebisco		
Bazooka		United States, Canada	Topps	Classic pink gum flavour in a small square shape. Each piece of gum comes with a comic strip featuring the main character Bazooka Joe.	
Beechies		United States	Beech-Nut		
Beemans		United States	Gerrit J. Verburg Co.		
Big League Chew		United States, Canada	Ford Gum	Classic Big League Chew is a baseball themed gum that comes in pouches to resemble that of chewing tobacco. They also have gumballs.	
Big Rally Blue Raspberry		United States, Canada	Ford Gum	Blue raspberry flavour	
Curve Ball Cotton Candy		United States, Canada	Ford Gum	Cotton candy flavour	
Ground Ball Grape		United States, Canada	Ford Gum	Grape flavour	
Outta' Here Original		United States, Canada	Ford Gum	Classic bubblegum flavour. Also comes in Easter and Christmas pouches, two sizes of Big Rally Buckets of gumballs, and a to go cup of mini gumballs.	
Slammin' Strawberry		United States, Canada	Ford Gum	Strawberry flavour	
Swingin' Sour Apple		United States, Canada	Ford Gum	Sour apple flavour	
Wild Pitch Watermelon		United States, Canada	Ford Gum	Watermelon flavour	
Big Red		United States, Canada	Wrigley	Cinnamon flavoured	
Big Tattoo		China	Fujian Jinjiang Kangjian Food Co., Ltd.	A variety of different gum that comes with various press on tattoos	
Big Babol		Italy	Perfetti Van Melle		
Biodent		IRAN	MasterFoodeh Co.	Sugar Free Chewing Gums containing xylitol. These series are tape-like shape; with tropical, strawberry, spearmint, banana & mango, pomegranate flavors.	
Activated Carbon Color		IRAN	MasterFoodeh Co.	Black gum, 100% natural, Mint flavor.	
45min lasting flavor		IRAN	MasterFoodeh Co.	Sugar Free Chewing Gums containing xylitol, Cool Mint flavor.	
In love		IRAN	MasterFoodeh Co.	5 tape-like shape with chocolate and strawberry flavor.	
Black Jack		United States	Gerrit J. Verburg Co.		
Blockhead		United Kingdom			
Brooklyn		Italy	Perfetti Van Melle		
Boomer		India	Wrigley	A strawberry Flavoured gum	
Bubbaloo		Mexico	Perfetti Van Melle		
Bubble Tape		United States, Canada	Wrigley	Line of gum under the Hubba Bubba brand. Comes in a tape-like shape and container. Comes in standard six foot rolls while the king size roll is nine feet and mega is ten feet.	
Bubble Yum		United States	Hershey	Cube-shaped with the classic bubblegum flavour	
Bubblicious		United Kingdom, United States, Canada	Perfetti Van Melle	Cube-shaped with the classic bubblegum flavour	

== C ==
Name	Image	Distribution	Manufacturer	Description	Ref
Carmen		Syria	Seham Food Stuff Co.		
Canel's		Mexico	Canel's		
Center Fresh		India	Perfetti Van Melle		
Chappies		South Africa	Mondelez International		
Chiclets		United Kingdom, Canada, United States, Mexico, Brazil	Perfetti Van Melle	Square-shaped gum with an outer shell that becomes soft while chewing	
Chicza		Mexico	Consorcio Chiclero		
Cinnaburst		United Kingdom	Cadbury	Cinnamon flavour	
Clorets		United Kingdom, Canada	Mondelez International		
Clove		United States	Gerrit J. Verburg Co.		
Cry Baby		United States, Canada	Tootsie Roll Industries		

== D ==
Name	Image	Distribution	Manufacturer	Description	Ref
Dentyne		United States, Canada	Perfetti Van Melle		
Dirol		Denmark	Dandy		
Donald Bubble Gum		Netherlands	Maple Leaf	Gum with ridges, to aid breaking it into pieces. Came with a small comic strip and sometimes with a temporary sticky tattoo. Was also available in a sugar-free varieties.	
Doublemint		United States, Canada, Philippines	Wrigley		
Dubble Bubble		United States, Canada	Tootsie Roll Industries	Classic bubblegum flavour in a small square shape. Each piece of gum comes with a comic strip featuring the main character Pud.	
Dunkin Bubble Gum		Spain			

== E ==
Name	Image	Distribution	Manufacturer	Description	Ref
Eat It		United States	Eat It, LLC		
Eclipse		United States, Australia	Wrigley		
Ello Gum		United States	Ello Gum International		
Europe Chewing Gum		Canada	Ayul Trading Incorporated		
Excel		Canada	Wrigley		
Exit		Turkey	Unigum		
Extra		Australia, Canada, Germany, Hong Kong, Ireland, New Zealand, South Africa, United Kingdom, United States, Mexico	Wrigley		

== F ==
Name	Image	Distribution	Manufacturer	Description	Ref
First Energy Gum		Netherlands	FIRST Energy International Holding B.V.		
FLY Gum		United States	Apollo Brands, LLC		
Focus Gum		Australia		Caffeinated Gum	
Freedent		United States, Canada	Wrigley		
Freshen Up		United States	Mondelez International		
Frooty Bubble Pop		Philippines	Columbia		
Fruit Stripe		United States	Ferrara		
Fusen gum		Japan	Marukawa		

== G ==
Name	Image	Distribution	Manufacturer	Description	Ref
Gator Gum		United States	Fleer Corporation		
Glee Gum		United States	Verve, Inc.	Focus on "all-natural" ingredients and xylitol sweetened gums	
Golf Gum		United States, Sweden, Norway, Iceland, Denmark, Finland	Apollo Brands, LLC		
Gorila		Portugal	Lusiteca		
GRIZZ Energy Gum		The Netherlands			

== H ==
Name	Image	Distribution	Manufacturer	Description	Ref
Hollywood		France	Perfetti Van Melle		
Hoodia Gum		United States			
Honest Gum		Australia		Natural chewing gum	
Hubba Bubba		United States, Canada, Australia	Wrigley		

== I ==
Name	Image	Distribution	Manufacturer	Description	Ref
Ice Breakers		United States, Canada	Hershey	Cube-shaped, long-lasting, sugar free gum with flavour crystals that comes in a variety of packaging	
Ice Cubes Arctic Grape		United States, Canada	Hershey	Long-lasting grape flavour	
Ice Cubes Bubble Breeze		United States, Canada	Hershey	Classic bubblegum flavour	
Ice Cubes Cherry Limeade		United States, Canada	Hershey	Cherry and lime flavour	
Ice Cubes Cinnamon		United States, Canada	Hershey	Cinnamon flavour	
Ice Cubes Cool Lemon		United States, Canada	Hershey	Tangy lemon flavour	
Ice Cubes Fruit Punch		United States, Canada	Hershey	Fruit punch flavour	
Ice Cubes Cool Orange		United States, Canada	Hershey	Orange flavour	
Ice Cubes Golden Apple		United States, Canada	Hershey	Apple flavour	
Ice Cubes Kiwi Watermelon		United States, Canada	Hershey	Classic kiwi and watermelon mix of flavours	
Ice Cubes Peppermint		United States, Canada	Hershey	Peppermint flavoured	
Ice Cubes Raspberry Sorbet		United States, Canada	Hershey	Raspberry flavour	
Ice Cubes Snow Cone		United States, Canada	Hershey	Limited edition gum with blue and red breath-freshening flavour crystals	
Ice Cubes Spearmint		United States, Canada	Hershey	Spearmint flavour	
Ice Cubes Strawberry Lemonade		United States, Canada	Hershey	Strawberry lemonade flavour	
Ice Cubes Tropical Freeze		United States, Canada	Hershey	Tropical flavours with a cooling effect	
Ice Cubes Wintergreen		United States, Canada	Hershey	Mint-like flavour	
iCool		Philippines	Columbia		

== J ==
Name	Image	Distribution	Manufacturer	Description	Ref
Jenkki		Finland	Leaf		
Judge		Philippines	Rebisco		
Juicy Fruit		United States, Canada, Australia	Wrigley	Original Juicy Fruit is a mix of fruit flavours	

== K ==
Name	Image	Distribution	Manufacturer	Description	Ref
Kallas		Syria	Khayri Kallas		

== L ==
Name	Image	Distribution	Manufacturer	Description	Ref
Lazer		Turkey	Ülker		
Lotte		Japan			
Love is...		Turkey			

== M ==
Name	Image	Distribution	Manufacturer	Description	Ref
Malabar		France	Carambar & Co	Rectangular gum packed individually that comes with a printed figure inside the packaging (image, extra short comic, temporary tattoo, etc.). Exists in several flavours, including dual-flavour gum.	
Maple Leaf Chewing Gum		Netherlands	Maple Leaf		
Maple Leaf Blue Mint		Netherlands	Maple Leaf		
Maple Leaf Fruit		Netherlands	Maple Leaf		
Maple Leaf Kosher Fruit		Netherlands	Maple Leaf		
Maple Leaf Longfresh		Netherlands	Maple Leaf	Contains double menthol.	
Maple Leaf Peppermint		Netherlands	Maple Leaf	Peppermint flavour.	
Maple Leaf Spearmint		Netherlands	Maple Leaf	Spearmint flavour.	
Master		Lebanon			
Mentos Gum		Netherlands, Canada, United States, Worldwide	Perfetti Van Melle	Sugar free gum that comes in a bottle, curvy bottle, bubble packaging, and stick form in the United Kingdom.	
Mentos Always White Bubblegum		Netherlands, Canada, United States, Worldwide	Perfetti Van Melle	Classic bubblegum flavour that also whitens teeth	
Mentos Always White Peppermint		Netherlands, Canada, United States, Worldwide	Perfetti Van Melle	Pepperment flavour that also whitens teeth	
Mentos Bubble Fresh Cotton Candy		Netherlands, Canada, United States, Worldwide	Perfetti Van Melle	Cotton candy flavoured gum in blue and pink	
Mentos Bubblegum		Netherlands, Canada, United States, Worldwide	Perfetti Van Melle	Classic bubblegum flavour	
Mentos Pure Fresh Cinnamon		Netherlands, Canada, United States, Worldwide	Perfetti Van Melle	Cinnamon flavoured	
Mentos Pure Fresh Grape Medley		Netherlands, Canada, United States, Worldwide	Perfetti Van Melle	Grape flavoured	
Mentos Pure Fresh Fresh Mint		Netherlands, Canada, United States, Worldwide	Perfetti Van Melle	Mint flavoured with green tea extract	
Mentos Pure Fresh Spearmint		Netherlands, Canada, United States, Worldwide	Perfetti Van Melle	Spearmint flavour with green tea extract	
Mentos Pure Fresh Tropical		Netherlands, Canada, United States, Worldwide	Perfetti Van Melle	Tropical flavours such as pineapple, orange, and mango	
Mentos Pure Fresh Watermelon		Netherlands, Canada, United States, Worldwide	Perfetti Van Melle	Watermelon flavoured	
Mentos Pure White Sweet Mint		Netherlands, Canada, United States, Worldwide	Perfetti Van Melle	Sweet mint flavour that also whitens teeth	
Mentos Pure Fresh Wintergreen		Netherlands, Canada, United States, Worldwide	Perfetti Van Melle	Mint-like flavour with green tea extract	
Mentos Red Fruit		Netherlands, Canada, United States, Worldwide	Perfetti Van Melle	Red fruit such strawberry and raspberry mixed with lime	
Mentos Red Fruit Lime & Tropical		Netherlands, Canada, United States, Worldwide	Perfetti Van Melle	Red fruit such as strawberry and raspberry mixed with lime and separate tropical flavours	
Mintad		Syria			
Mr. DJ		Denmark	Dandy Chewing Gum A/S		

== N ==
Name	Image	Distribution	Manufacturer	Description	Ref
Nature dent		IRAN	MasterFoodeh Co.	100% natural gum base, sugar and aspartame free.	
Saffron		IRAN	MasterFoodeh Co.	This product contains saffron powder.	
cardamom		IRAN	MasterFoodeh Co.	This product contains cardamom powder. Cardamom contains Antioxidant, Anti-Inflammatory effects, and Diuretic properties.	
Turpentine & Mint		IRAN	MasterFoodeh Co.	It reduces Dental cavities, Bad breath, Depression, Fatigue, Headache, Stress, Colonic spasm, and Gastric-gas.	
Neuro		United States	NeuroGum Inc.	Energy gum containing 40 mg caffeine and 60 mg L-theanine per piece.	
Nicorette		Sweden, Canada, Worldwide	McNeil AB	A stop smoking aid	

== O ==
Name	Image	Distribution	Manufacturer	Description	Ref
Orbit		United States，Malta	Wrigley		
Ouch!		United States	Wrigley	Sugar-free gum under the Hubba Bubba brand. Each stick of gum comes in wrapper designed to look like a bandage and was packaged in a metallic container similar to a bandage box. Each box came with one of twenty collectable games.	
Ouch! Bubblegum		United States	Wrigley	Classic bubblegum flavour	
Ouch! Grape		United States	Wrigley	Grape flavour	
Ouch! Strawberry		United States	Wrigley	Strawberry flavour	
Ouch! Watermelon		United States	Wrigley	Watermelon flavour	

== P ==
Name	Image	Distribution	Manufacturer	Description	Ref
Pedro		Czech Republic	Velim		
Peppersmith		United Kingdom	Peppersmith		
Pintoora		Philippines	Columbia		
P.K.		Australia	Wrigley		
Proaroma		Brazil	Candy Company		
PÜR Gum		Canada	Action Candy Company		

== Q ==
Name	Image	Distribution	Manufacturer	Description	Ref
QUICK! ENERGY Gum		Czech Republic	Quick Energy		

== R ==
Name	Image	Distribution	Manufacturer	Description	Ref
Rasha		Syria			
Razzles		United States, Canada	Tootsie Roll Industries	Circular candy that turns into gum upon being chewed. Originally introduced in 1966 by Fleer Company.	
Razzles Original		United States, Canada	Tootsie Roll Industries	Flavours are lemon, grape, raspberry, orange, and blueberry	
Razzles Sour		United States, Canada	Tootsie Roll Industries	Flavours are lemon, cherry, blue raspberry, and orange	
Razzles Tropical		United States, Canada	Tootsie Roll Industries	Flavours are pineapple, strawberry banana, tropical punch, tangerine, and kiwi-lime	
Renex		IRAN	MasterFoodeh Co.	sugar and aspartame free. Flavors are watermelon, eucalyptus, strawberry, tropical, spearmint.	

== S ==
Name	Image	Distribution	Manufacturer	Description	Ref
Safari Bubble Gum		Germany	Hitschler		
Scottie Chew Crazy Long		United States			
Seham		Syria	Seham Food Stuff Co.		
Simply Gum		United States			
Splot		Columbia	Colombina		
Sportlife		Netherlands, Belgium	Cloetta		
Spry		United States	Xlear Inc.		
Stimorol		Denmark	Perfetti Van Melle		
Stride		United Kingdom, United States, Canada	Mondelez International		
Super Bubble		United States	Ferrara		
Surpass		United States	Wrigley	Short-lived antacid gum	
Synapse® Gum		United States	Synapse, LLC		

== T ==
Name	Image	Distribution	Manufacturer	Description	Ref
TATTOO Bubble Gum		Germany	Hitschler		
Think Gum		United States	Think Gum, LLC		
Thrills		Canada	Tootsie Roll Industries		
Tidal Wave		United States	Amurol Confections		
Trident		United States, Canada, United Kingdom, Europe	Perfetti Van Melle		
True Gum		Copenhagen, Denmark			
Turbo		Turkey, Poland, Romania	Kent	Square-shaped gum that comes with stickers	
Two Wise Chimps		United Kingdom	The Natural Gum Company Ltd.		

== U ==
Name	Image	Distribution	Manufacturer	Description	Ref
Underbrush		United States	Nathan & Sons, LLC		

== V ==
Name	Image	Distribution	Manufacturer	Description	Ref
V6		Sweden	Perfetti Van Melle		
V Fresh		Philippines	Columbia		
Vibe Energy Gum		United Kingdom	Super Mouth Ltd.		

== W ==
Name	Image	Distribution	Manufacturer	Description	Ref
Winterfresh		United States	Wrigley		
Wrigley's Spearmint		United States, Canada	Wrigley		
WUG		Spain	WUGUM Functional Gums SL		

== X ==
Name	Image	Distribution	Manufacturer	Description	Ref
X-Time		Columbia	Colombina		
Xylifresh		Netherlands	Cloetta	Chewing gum with 100% xylitol that removes plaque and helps prevent cavities. Launched in 1991 in the Netherlands.	
XyloBurst		United States	Focus Nutrition		

== Y ==
Name	Image	Distribution	Manufacturer	Description	Ref
Yakee		Philippines	Columbia		
Yosan		Indonesia	Mustika Manis Utama		

== Z ==
Name	Image	Distribution	Manufacturer	Description	Ref
Zapp Gum		United States	Zapp Xylitol Gum Brands		
ZOFT Gum		United States	ZOFT Gum Company		

== See also ==
- Bubble gum
- Chewing gum industry
- List of confectionery brands
