= Hitschler =

Hitschler is a surname. Notable people with the surname include:

- Brigitte Hitschler (born 1954), German artist
- Konrad Hitschler (1896–1945), German officer
- Thomas Hitschler (born 1982), German politician

It can also refer to:

- Hitschler (company), a German confectionery manufacturer

== See also ==
- German chewing gum producer
