= Gum base =

Component of chewing and bubble gum

Gum base is the non-nutritive, non-digestible, water-insoluble masticatory delivery system used to carry sweeteners, flavors, and any other substances in chewing gum and bubble gum. It provides all the basic textural and masticatory properties of gum.

The actual composition of a gum base is usually a trade secret. In the United States, the FDA allows 46 different chemicals under the umbrella of "gum base". These chemicals are grouped into the following categories.

- Synthetic coagulated or concentrated latices: Polymers such as butadiene-styrene, polyvinyl acetate, polyethylene, paraffin, and petroleum waxes are the most commonly used gum bases on the market today. They are petroleum-derived polymers which are designed to maximize elasticity and incorporate other components of the gum base as well as flavors and sweeteners in their chemical matrix.
- Plasticizing materials (softeners): These materials generally help to emulsify various chemical components that do not always bind to each other. They are generally medium-sized molecules and are frequently esters of tree resins and rosins.
- Terpene resins: This specific subcategory is not fundamentally different from materials in the first two categories except it is a specific substance that can be produced both naturally and artificially.
- Preservatives: The most common antioxidant preservative in gum, BHT, functions by scavenging free radicals (which spoil food) and sequestering them behind its sterically hindering tert-butyl groups.
- Natural coagulated or concentrated latices of vegetable origin: These include many of the resins such as chicle that were traditionally chewed as gum. It also includes natural waxes like beeswax and latex (natural rubber). These natural sources of gum base have largely been replaced by synthetic, petroleum-derived gum bases.

Gum bases for chewing gum are different from those for bubble gum. A bubble gum base is formulated with the ability to blow bubbles; it contains higher levels of elastomers or higher molecular weight polymers for this purpose. Gum bases for antacid use calcium carbonate as a filler, while gum bases for acid flavored gum use talc as a filler, since acids can react with calcium carbonate to produce carbon dioxide gas, which is undesirable.

Bubble gum usually contains 15–20% gum base, while chewing gum contains 20–25% gum base and sugar-free chewing gum contains 25–30% gum base.

Researchers at the University of Illinois at Urbana–Champaign and at Wm. Wrigley Jr. Company are studying the possibility of making gum base with biodegradable zein (corn protein).

Large chewing gum manufacturers generally produce their own gum base in-house while small chewing gum producers usually buy gum base from third-party suppliers.

== Composition and manufacture ==
Another way to categorize the various components of gum bases is by their utility in the base.

- Elastomers: provide the elasticity or bounce, and can be natural latexes (e.g. couma macrocarpa (also called leche caspi or sorva), loquat (also called nispero), tunu, jelutong, or chicle (which is still commercially produced), or synthetic rubbers (e.g. styrene-butadiene rubber, butyl rubber, polyisobutylene).
- Resins: provide a cohesive body or strength, and are most often glycerol esters of gum, terpene resins, and/or polyvinyl acetate.
- Waxes: act as softening agents and are most usually paraffin or microcrystalline wax.
- Fats: behave as plasticizers and mainly come from hydrogenated vegetable oils.
- Emulsifiers: help to hydrate, the most common being lecithin or glycerol monostearate.
- Fillers: impart texture and the most commonly used are calcium carbonate or talc.
- Antioxidants: protect from oxidation and extend shelf-life; the most common type is BHT.

Old gum bases were based on either natural elastomers such as latexes, vegetable gums like chicle, spruce gum, and mastic gum, or alternatively on waxes, e.g. paraffin wax and beeswax, but today synthetic rubbers are preferred.

== See also ==
- Gums and Stabilisers for the Food Industry, a conference series about title subject
- Bubblegum
- Chewing gum
- Functional chewing gum
- Chewing gum industry
- List of chewing gum brands
