= Think Gum =

American chewing gum brand

A packet of Think Gum

Think Gum is a brand of functional chewing gum made by Palo Alto, California-based company Think Gum LLC. Its packaging claims to "enhance concentration and improve memory". It contains caffeine, Ginkgo biloba, Bacopa, vinpocetine, guarana, peppermint and rosemary. The chewing gum is sugar free and contains 10 mg of caffeine per piece. The brand was introduced in late 2007.

Think Gum was created by a Stanford University medical student who developed the product to get more out of his studying.

Think Gum was featured at the 2008 Cool Product Expo as well as on the San Francisco Bay Area Evening News. Think Gum LLC has sponsored events such as the Butt-Numb-A-Thon, Stanford's Entrepreneurship Week, and the Ernst & Young Entrepreneur of the Year Awards.

== See also ==
- Bubblegum
- Chewing gum
- Gum industry
- List of chewing gum brands
