= Super bubble =

Super bubble may refer to:

- Superbubble, an astronomical term for a large low-density region of the interstellar medium created by stellar winds
- Super Bubble, a brand of bubble gum
- Super Bubble Pop, a video game
- Super Bubble Bobble, an advanced mode in the game Bubble Bobble
