= Functional chewing gum =

Gum which serves a practical function

- Type: Confectionery
- Variations: Nicotine gum, dental gum

Functional chewing gum is the name given to types of chewing gum which impart some practical function instead of, or in addition to, the usual enjoyment provided by a traditional chewing gum as a confectionery product. Examples of this include nicotine gum which is used to aid smoking cessation and products like the herbal supplement Think Gum. The term 'functional' is almost always applied to gum with some additional function. Medical uses for 'functional chewing gum' include a reported reduction in the duration of post-operative ileus following abdominal and specifically gastrointestinal surgery.

Ortek Therapeutics developed an arginine-containing gum could be used to reduce cavities.

== See also ==
- Aspergum
- Bubble gum
- Chewing gum
- Gum base
- Gum industry
- List of chewing gum brands
