= Chuckles =

Type of candy

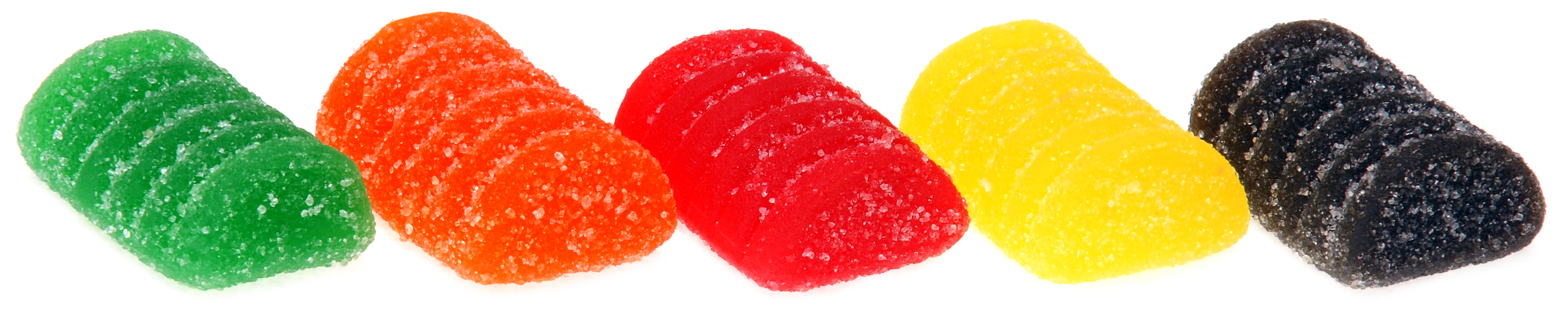
- Chuckles candies
- Type: Confectionery
- Place of origin: Danville, Illinois
- Created by: Fred W. Amend
- Invented: 1921
- Main ingredients: Corn syrup, sugar, cornstarch, natural and artificial flavors and colors
- Food energy (per serving): 150 kcal (630 kJ)
Nutritional value
(per serving)
- Protein: 0 g
- Fat: 0 g
- Carbohydrate: 37 g
- Other information: produced by Ferrara Candy Company

Chuckles in package

Chuckles are jelly candies coated with a light layer of sugar. They come in five flavors: lime, orange, cherry, lemon, and licorice. Each package of Chuckles contains one piece of each flavor. The candies are made with corn syrup, sugar, modified and unmodified cornstarch, and natural and artificial flavors and colors.

== History ==
The Chuckles brand was first produced in 1921 by Fred W. Amend. The only factory was in Danville, Illinois. Nabisco bought the Chuckles Company in 1970. A management buyout occurred in 1986, and the company was quickly acquired by Leaf. Leaf's US properties were sold to The Hershey Company in 1996 and the Chuckles trademark was licensed to Hershey. Hershey sub-licensed Chuckles to Farley's & Sathers in 2002, which later merged with Ferrara Pan in 2012 (also owned by Catterton Partners), forming the Ferrara Candy Company. The Chuckles trademark is currently owned by Iconic IP Interests, LLC.

From 1974 to 1975, Chuckles sponsored stuntman Evel Knievel.

== See also ==
- List of confectionery brands
