= Aspergum =

Brand of analgesic chewing gum

Aspergum is the United States trademark name for an analgesic chewing gum, whose active ingredient is aspirin. Aspergum is owned by Retrobrands USA LLC.

Aspergum contained 227 mg (3½ grains) of aspirin, and was available in cherry and orange flavors. This product was generally used for the analgesic, anti-inflammatory, and anti-pyretic properties of its active ingredient. The Aspergum trademark is currently owned by Insight Pharmaceuticals, the same company that produces the aspirin- and caffeine-based Anacin.

== History ==
Medicated chewing gum containing aspirin was first sold in the United States in 1924. In December 1927, Frank M. Dillard and William C. Nalle formed the Dillard-Nalle company and sought U.S. trademark protection for Aspergum. Dillard-Nalle then began selling their Dellard's Aspergum in the United States in 1928. it was an early example of a functional gum – chewing gum as a drug delivery system.

It was significant in the recognition of aspirin's antithrombotic effect, when general practitioner Lawrence Craven reported in 1953 that patients who chewed Aspergum as an analgesic after tonsillectomy tended to bleed more easily. As a result of Dr. Craven's discovery through Aspergum in the 1950s, physicians themselves now often take low-dose aspirin to prevent heart attacks and strokes, and emergency rooms routinely give aspirin to patients who they suspect may be experiencing a heart attack.

In June 1993, Farmades spa of Rome, Italy began manufacturing Aspergum Confetti Gommosi Masticabili for sale in Italy.

People have adopted their own uses for the gum. For example, in her 1997 book Streisand, Academy Award-winning American singer Barbra Streisand relates a story of how she filled in the gap caused by the removal of two front teeth with Aspergum when she began her career.

In 1998, Gumtech announced that it was to produce Aspergum for Schering-Plough HealthCare Products.

Aspergum was discontinued in 2006. As of January 2016, Retrobrands USA LLC has obtained the trademark and plans to re-launch the brand.

== See also ==
- Functional gum
