= Favorite Brands International =

Favorite Brands International, Inc.
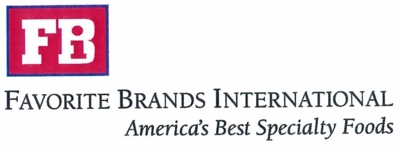
- Industry: Confections
- Founded: July 1, 1995
- Defunct: November 19, 1999
- Successor: Nabisco
- Headquarters: Bannockburn, Illinois, United States
- Number of locations: 11 plants
- Area served: North America
- Key people: Steven F. Kaplan; Al Bono; Mark Upson
- Products: marshmallows; caramels; fruit snacks; gummies
- Brands: Jet-Puffed Marshmallows
- Revenue: US$ 700,000,000 (1999)
- Owner: Texas Pacific Group
- Number of employees: 4,000

Favorite Brands International was founded in 1995, when Texas Pacific Group bought Kraft Foods, Inc. confection division.

== Formation ==
In early 1995, the newly appointed head of Kraft General Foods, James M. Kilts, merged Kraft USA, General Foods USA, and Kraft General Foods Canada into a single organization called Kraft Foods, Inc. This was the main food subsidiary of Philip Morris USA. Looking to improve margins, Kraft Foods put their confections division, which consisted of the Jet-Puffed Marshmallows brand and Kraft Caramels, along with the Kendallville, Indiana plant, and marshmallow production and packaging equipment from Kraft's Buena Park, California, Garland, Texas, and Canadian plants, up for sale in early 1995. Texas Pacific Group and InterWest Partners acquired the $150-million-in-sales caramel and marshmallow businesses on July 1, 1995.

== Expansion ==
In May 1996, Favorite Brands bought out one of its major competitors, Kidd & Co, headquartered in Ligonier, Indiana, along with a plant in Henderson, Nevada. In October 1996, the Ligonier plant was converted to a warehouse and all production was transferred to the Henderson and Kendallville plants, along with the employees.

Favorite Brands bought Sathers, Inc., Round Lake, Minnesota, with an estimated $200 million in annual sales.

Favorite Brands bought Farley Foods USA, August 31, 1996, with an estimated $300 million in annual sales, and five production facilities.

Mark Upson, who was hired in March 1998, as the president-chief operating officer, resigned in late May of the same year. Al Bono, the chairman-chief executive officer, resigned in late July 1998, citing "differences in operational issues with the board".

== Bankruptcy and buyout ==
On September 29, 1999, Nabisco announced they were buying Favorite Brands for $475 million along with assuming $600 million of debt owed to creditors.

== Bibliography ==
- "Kidd and Company, Inc".
- "History of Texas Pacific Group Inc".
- Lazarus, George (July 28, 1998). "More Sour News". Chicago Tribune.
- Denton, Jon (September 13, 1996). "New Owner Expands Candy Plant in City". The Oklahoman.
- "Company Overview of Favorite Brands International, Inc". Bloomberg News.
