= Rain-Blo =

Bubble gum brand

Rain-Blo logo

Rain-Blo is an American brand of bubble gum that comes in a variety of fruit flavors, introduced by Leaf Confectionery in 1940, and acquired from Hershey Foods by Farley's & Sathers Candy Company, merged with Ferrara Pan in 2012, becoming the Ferrara Candy Company. They are bubble gum balls containing an internal fruit flavoring that is colored to match the coating on the outside.

Rain-Blo gum balls are also available in a larger "king size", marketed as Jum-Blo. On average, classic Rain-Blo gum balls are about 5 grams while Jum-Blo gum balls are about 14 grams.

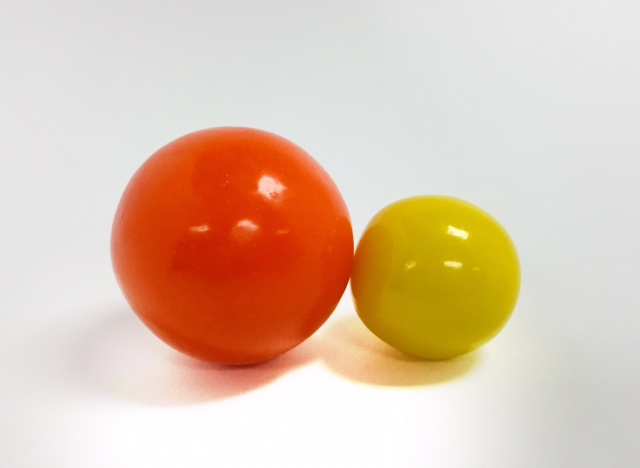
Size of Jumblo (orange) compared to Rain-Blo (yellow)

== See also ==
- List of confectionery brands
