= Jet-Puffed Marshmallows =

Brand of marshmallows products

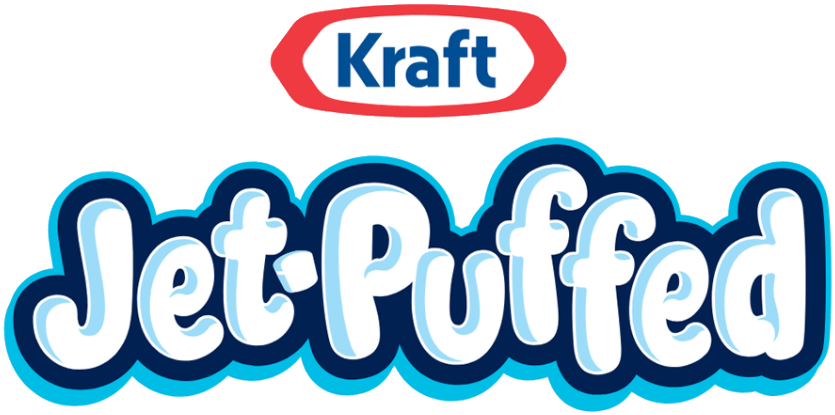

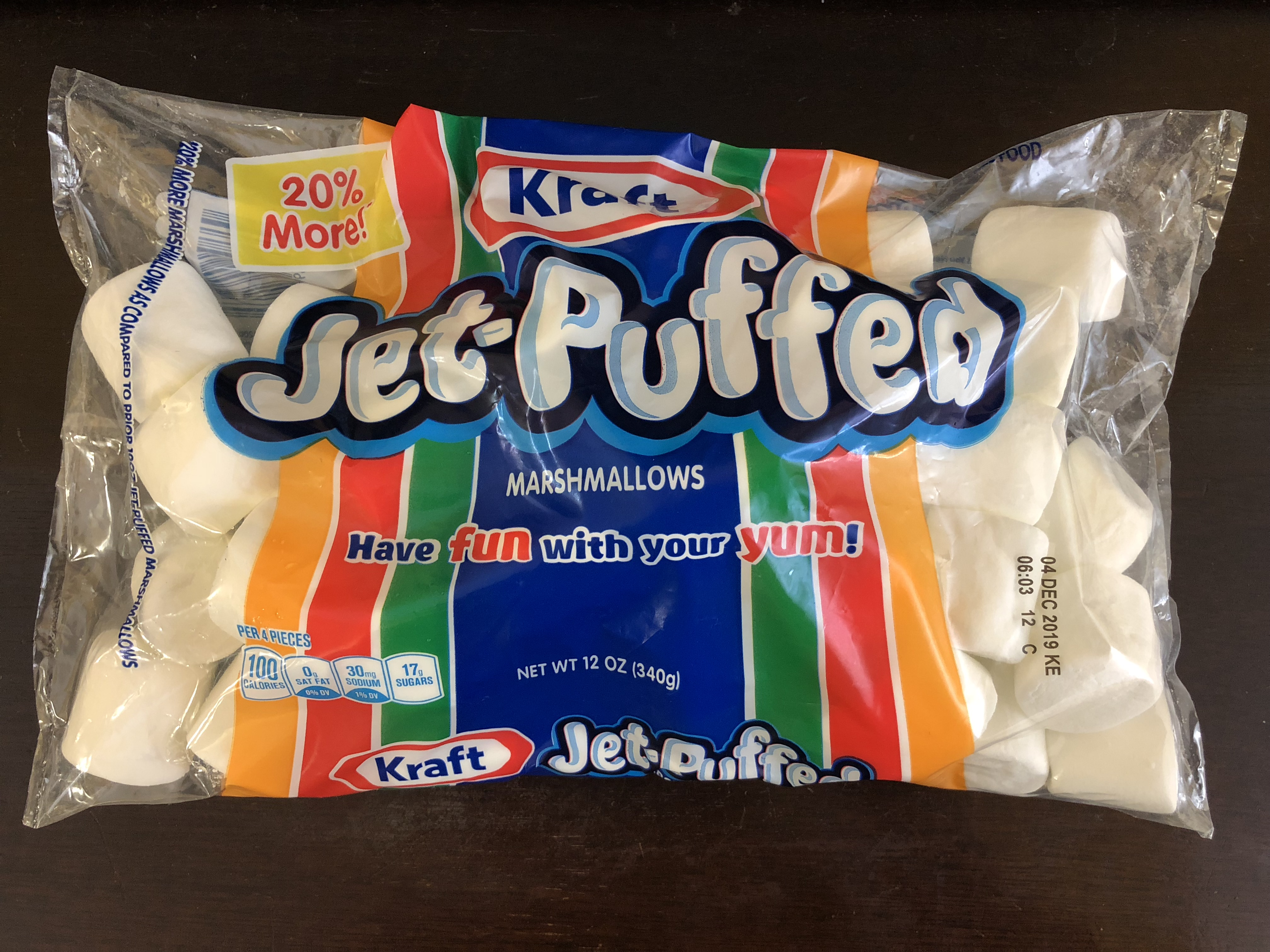
- Product type: Marshmallow
- Current owner: Kraft Heinz
- Produced by: Kraft Heinz
- Country: U.S.
- Introduced: 1958; 68 years ago
- Website: kraftheinz.com/jetpuffed

Jet-Puffed Marshmallows is an American brand of marshmallow and marshmallow related products, manufactured by Kraft Foods and first introduced in 1958. Some notable products include Jet-Puffed Marshmallow Cream and various novelty shaped marshmallows, such as heart, flower, bunny, and star marshmallows.

== History ==
Prior to the early-1950s, marshmallows were usually either bars or small squares, rather than the modern cylindrical extruded shapes. In 1948, Doumak, an American food company, invented and began patenting the modern extruding process, which Kraft would start using in 1953, and by 1958, begin branding as "Jet-Puffed". To help advertise the marshmallows, a simulated space ship made by Aerojet-General Corporation was offered as a prize for Kraft's ongoing "Name the Training Space Ship" promotion. The rocket toured U.S. cities through 1959, and had young people waiting in long lines for their chance to sit at the control panels.

In 1995, Kraft's confectionery business (including Jet-Puffed Marshmallows) was sold to Texas Pacific Group, which formed the company Favorite Brands International. Nabisco purchased Favorite Brands International in 1999, and Kraft Foods themselves purchased Nabisco in 2000, returning the Jet-Puffed Marshmallows brand to Kraft.

Kraft at one time offered a replica of the marshmallow dispenser that Spock used in the movie Star Trek V: The Final Frontier.

In 2020, Jet-Puffed Marshmallows changed logos for the first time since 1987.

== Flavors ==
There have been many seasonal and lasting flavors for Jet-Puffed Marshmallows. Some of these flavors include the original flavor, various fruits, peppermint, French vanilla, and chocolate flavors.

== See also ==
- List of Kraft brands
- General Foods Corporation
- Ovson Egg
