= Super Bubble =

Brand of bubble gum

Super Bubble Logo

Original Flavor Super Bubble Gum

Super Bubble was a brand of bubble gum produced by Ferrara Candy Company first introduced in 1946 by the Thomas Wiener Company led by Douglas Thomas and Donald Wiener in Memphis, Tennessee. The recipe for the original Super Bubble flavor came from a much older brand known as Bub's Daddy. Super Bubble was originally sold for five cents, but in the face of increased competition from Dubble Bubble and Bazooka, the company brought out a one-cent version in 1948.

In addition to the original flavor, Super Bubble also came in green apple, grape, watermelon, and cherry flavors, although cherry is no longer in production. The candy is individually wrapped and typically sold in bags or plastic tubs.

The brand has changed hands many times. Thomas Wiener Company became The Donruss Company in 1954 when D.J. Thomas sold his interest in the company to Donald and Russ Wiener. General Mills acquired Super Bubble in 1969 and later sold the gum line to Leaf, which in turn was acquired by The Hershey Company in 1996. Farley's & Sathers Candy Company later bought it from Hershey and in 2012, Farley & Sathers merged with Ferrara Pan to become Ferrara Candy Company, who continued to produce the gum until its eventual discontinuation in 2024.

In January 2024, Ferrara announced that it would discontinue the brand, along with Fruit Stripe Gum, citing changing consumer habits.

== See also ==
- List of confectionery brands
