= Ortek Therapeutics =

Oral care products healthcare company

- Type: Private companies
- Industry: Dental; Health care
- Founded: 1998
- Headquarters: Roslyn Heights, New York
- Products: oral care
- Website: ecddetect.com

Ortek Therapeutics, Inc. is a private healthcare company based in Roslyn Heights, New York, which specializes in researching and commercializing oral care products. It was founded in 1998.

== History ==
To date, Ortek's commercial success is based on the company's patented AlkaGen Technology (an arginine bicarbonate/calcium carbonate complex). The company incorporates this technology in their sugarless soft chews, BasicBites. Arginine is an amino acid found in many foods and is also naturally found in saliva. On tooth surfaces, arginine is broken down by certain pH-rising plaque bacteria to acid-neutralizing alkali. This results in a sustained neutral or elevated oral plaque pH, which creates an optimal environment for remineralisation of the teeth. The calcium component is available for enhanced remineralisation and the carbonate components aid in buffering the teeth from acid attacks and support the activities of arginine and calcium. The AlkaGen technology, which is based on over 40 years of research in saliva chemistry, was licensed to the company by The Research Foundation of the State University of New York after being developed by the Department of Oral Biology and Pathology at Stony Brook University. A 2008 clinical trial published in the Journal of Clinical Dentistry found that a confection with AlkaGen Technology was highly effective in preventing cavities in Venezuelan children, as those consuming the confections had 62% less cavities than the placebo group. Ortek developed and commercialized two dental pastes for sensitive teeth that were based on the arginine bicarbonate/calcium carbonate technology. These products, named DenClude and ProClude, were sold to Colgate Palmolive in 2008. ProClude is now known as Colgate Sensitive Pro Relief Desensitizing Paste with Pro Argin Technology.

The company is also in late stage development of an electronic early cavity detector, called the Ortek ECD.
