= Fruit Stripe =

Brand of chewing gum

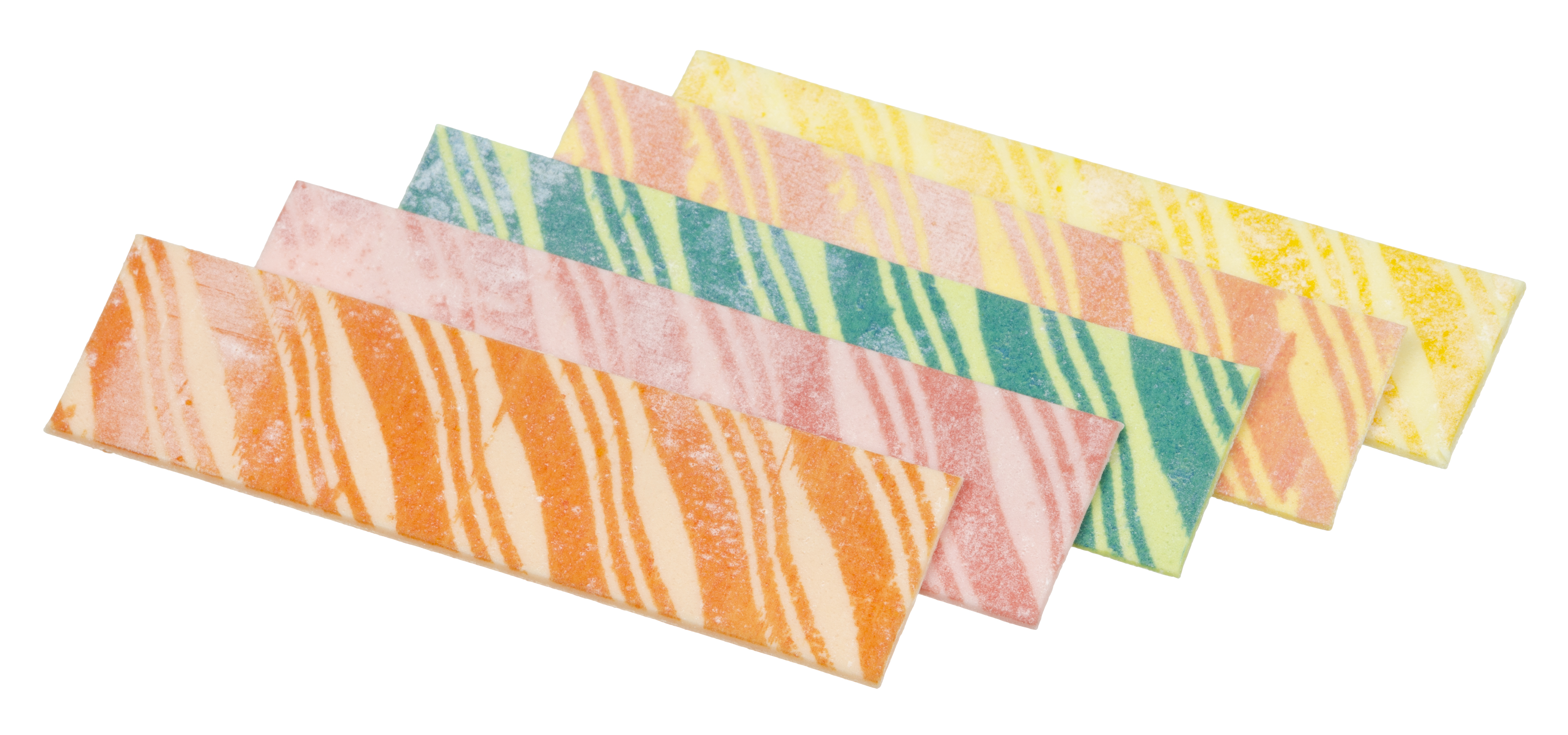
All five Fruit Stripe gum flavors

Fruit Stripe was an artificially and naturally flavored fruit chewing gum produced by Beech-Nut in 1960 and discontinued in 2024. The individual pieces of gum were striped and were packaged in zebra-striped wrappers, which also acted as temporary tattoos.

== History ==
The "Five Flavor Gum" was invented by James Parker and first sold in 1960 by the Beech-Nut company. In 1981, Nabisco acquired Fruit Stripe through its purchase of the Beech-Nut Life Savers's candy line from E. R. Squibb. Farley's & Sathers Candy Company acquired the Fruit Stripe brand name in 2003 from The Hershey Company. Farley's & Sathers merged with Ferrara Pan during 2012, forming the Ferrara Candy Company, which became a wholly owned subsidiary of Ferrero during 2017.

A new variety was introduced, Fruit Stripe Gummy Candy, in 2022. In January 2024, Ferrero announced that it would cease further production of Fruit Stripe gum.

== Flavors ==
Two types of five-flavor packs of Fruit Stripe were produced:

1. Chewing gum: wet 'n wild melon, cherry, lemon, orange, and peach smash
2. Bubble gum: cherry, grape, mixed fruit, lemon, and cotton candy

== Mascots ==
A character known as the Fruit Stripe Gum Man was used to promote the product; he was an anthropomorphic gum pack with limbs and a face. The Stripe Family Animals, which included a zebra, tiger, elephant, and mouse, were also used for advertising and featured in a coloring book and plush toys.

However, the zebra—later named Yipes—outlasted the other characters to become Fruit Stripe's sole mascot. Yipes was shown prominently on Fruit Stripe gum packaging. The advertising slogan "Yipes! Stripes!" has often been used with this character. Wrappers contain temporary tattoos of Yipes inline skating, skateboarding, playing baseball, hang gliding, playing basketball, bicycling, snowboarding, surfing, playing soccer, playing tennis, and eating grass. In 1988, Yipes was made into a promotional bendy figure.

== Promotions ==
In 1996, Fruit Stripe gave five cents from the sale of each Jumbo Pack and Variety Multipack to the World Wildlife Fund, totaling about $100,000, for the preservation of endangered animals and their habitats

== See also ==
- List of confectionery brands
