= Farley's & Sathers Candy Company =

Umbrella candy company

- Type: Subsidiary
- Industry: Confectioneries; Food
- Founded: 2002; 24 years ago
- Defunct: 2012; 14 years ago
- Fate: Merged with Ferrara Pan to form Ferrara Candy Company
- Headquarters: Round Lake, Minnesota, U.S.
- Products: Candy; Marshmallows
- Parent: Catterton Partners

Farley's & Sathers Candy Company was created as an umbrella company to roll up many small companies, brands and products under a common management team. The confectionery business segment is made up of many small companies, often with intertwined relationships and histories.

Catterton Partners formed the Farley's & Sathers Candy Company in 2002 as a vehicle for the purchase of some of the former Farley Foods Company and Sathers Candy Company assets and brands from Kraft.

Since that time, additional brands and businesses have been added to the roster.

In 2012, the owners of Farley's & Sathers, L Catterton Partners, merged Farley and Sathers with Ferrara Pan Candy Company. L Catterton Partners retained controlling interest in the company, and the name of the company was changed to the Ferrara Candy Company.

In November 2017, The Ferrero Group announced that they were going to acquire the Ferrara Candy Company, which was finalized in December 2017.

== History ==
Under Favorite Brands ownership, the formerly independent Farley's and Sathers companies were combined with the Dae Julie Company and with Trolli. Under Favorite Brands' management, Dae Julie was rolled into the Farley division while Sathers and Trolli remained as separate divisions. Favorite Brands was eventually acquired by Nabisco, and then shortly afterwards, Nabisco itself was merged with Kraft Foods.

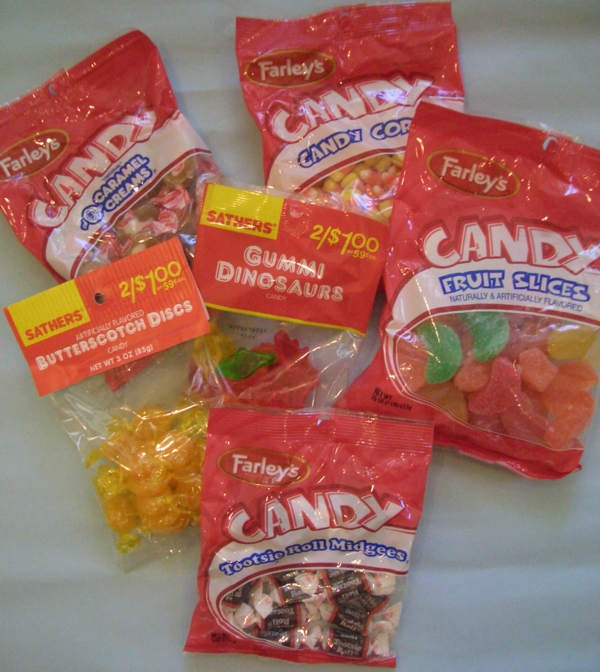
Selection of Farley and Sathers product

After the merger, as Kraft divested brands, divisions, and assets, Farley & Sathers emerged as a new company in its own right though shorn of a few key business units. The North American Trolli operation, which had been retained by Kraft, was eventually sold to the Wrigley Company, who subsequently sold it to Farley & Sathers. Much of the history of these companies is intertwined: Sathers bought much of its bulk candy supplies from Farley; the growth of Farley Foods before Favorite Brands was in no small part due to the implosion of E.J. Brach's which itself became part of the new Farley's and Sathers organization; the problems at Favorite Brands could be partially attributed to a resurgent E.J. Brach's after it merged with the Brock of Chattanooga candy company to become "Brach and Brock". When sold by Kraft, Farley lost its fruit snack business but kept the Dae Julie gummi plant; with Farley & Sathers' purchase of the Brach and Brock company, it regained a fruit snack business though it had lost its advantage as first to market in the category. Many plants and distribution facilities were closed, consolidated, or replaced over time.

=== Company roots ===
==== Sathers ====
John Sather, a local grocer in Round Lake, Minnesota, established the Sather Company in 1936. He purchased trainloads of cookies to sell to stores throughout southwestern Minnesota.

By the early 1960s, Sathers distributed products to the five-state Midwest region. The territory grew and product lines and operations changed to include the addition of a nut roasting operation in the 1960s. With the addition of telemarketing in 1967, the customer territory expanded to eleven Midwest states. With this increase, Sathers added tractor trailer units to its trucking fleet.

Sathers was primarily a rebagger. Rebaggers purchase product in bulk, in pallet-quantities or container loads if imported, and repackage it into smaller retail packaging. One source Sathers used was Farley Candy Company though many other sources were used as well. Many of its chocolate products were provided by the Haviland Candy Company, a division of NECCO.

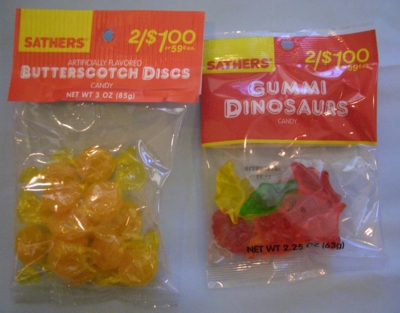
Examples of Sathers product

The Sathers company is considered to be the innovator behind packaged "pegboard" or "hanging bag" candy, now one of the candy industry's primary marketing programs for general line candies. Another innovation was the telemarketing system it implemented when its sales force quit en masse due to low wages. The sales people had been required to not only sell the product, but also to deliver it and stock it on store shelves. Sathers' telemarketing initiative is considered one of the earliest implementations of this process, where orders were taken by phone and the customers would unpack and stock the shelves themselves.

The company continued to expand and in 1972, Sathers went nationwide with product distribution when it secured half of the national Kmart business. When it acquired Chattanooga-based Kitchen Fresh Company in 1983, the remainder of Kmart's national business became Sathers'. Sathers' expansion continued with the company purchasing the Bayou Candy Division of the American Candy Company in 1985; Powell's Candy Company (of Hopkins, Minnesota) and Northstar Candy Company (of Rogers, Minnesota) were both acquired in 1991. Sathers now had three manufacturing facilities—(a nut roasting and processing plant in Chattanooga, Tennessee and two confectionery plants in Hopkins, Minnesota and in New Orleans, Louisiana)—in addition to their two distribution centers.

==== Farley ====
In 1870, Gunther Farley and two of his brothers founded Gunther Chocolate Company. Gunther Chocolate Company later merged with another, smaller, Farley-family-owned candycompany in 1891, becoming Farley Candy Company.

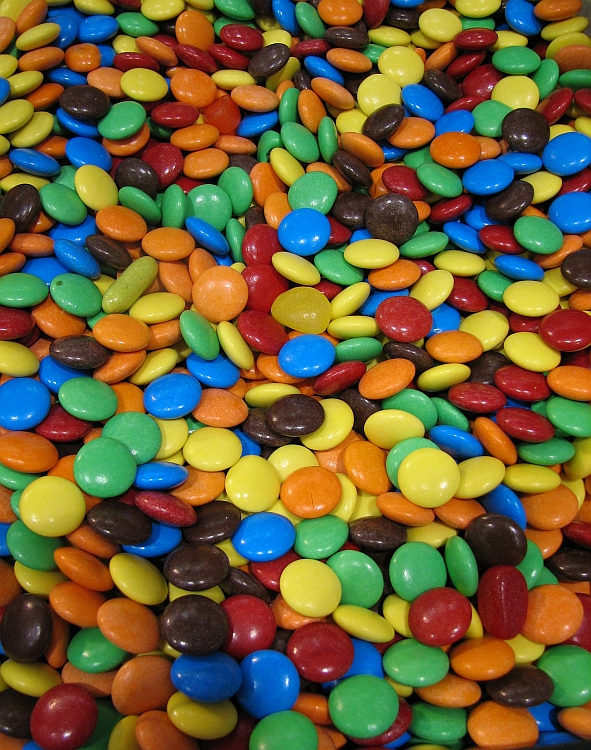
Example of product produced by the panning process; multiple layers of coatings are gradually added to a core within a large spinning pan. The core can be chocolate, a nut, or almost anything edible.

As it grew, Farley Candy moved its operations from North Franklin Street in Chicago, then to Superior Street, and then, in 1951, to the north suburb of Skokie. It passed to a third generation of the Farley family, represented by Preston Farley, who managed it until 1968. In that year, Preston Farley sold a majority interest in the company to Raymond Underwood.

During the Preston Farley and Underwood years Farley was primarily a manufacturer of jell and other products, manufactured in starch moguls; Farley also produced cinnamon imperials, a panned product, and a line of hard candies including sanded lemon hard candy. Preston Farley invented the Farley Jet Cooker, subsequently licensed to the Staley Company. The Jet Cooker is now known as the Staley Jet Cooker per the licensing agreement, and is still used today in the manufacture of confections and paper.

In 1974, William Ellis purchased 100% of the company. In the same year he purchased the Lakeside Candy Company, located in Zion, Illinois and commonly known as Zion Candy, which produced a full line of individually wrapped hard candies such as starlight mints and butterscotches.

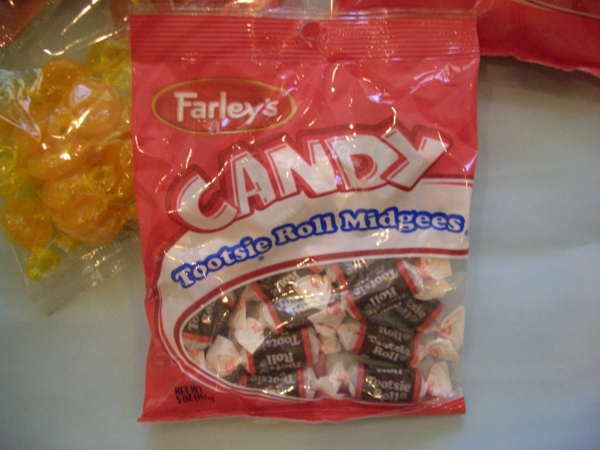
Example of product purchased in bulk from other manufacturers and repackaged for resale

In 1981, Farley was operating out of its plants in Skokie and Zion, Illinois when a third plant was added. A 103,000-square-foot (9,600 m^{2}) plant, formerly used to produce the York Peppermint Pattie and Power House bar was purchased from Peter Paul-Cadbury. This plant became Farley Candy Company's primary chocolate manufacturing site, though it also produced other products.

In 1985, Farley bought a vacant 265,000-square-foot (24,600 m^{2}) warehouse in Chicago on 31st Street, and converted it for confection manufacturing. This large plant became the primary manufacturing facility for Farley when it came online in June 1986. This plant was used primarily to manufacture a newly emerging category of candy: Fruit snacks, and later, Fruit Rolls. Fruit Snacks were manufactured using the same equipment and processes as gummy candies, using real fruit juice as an ingredient and vitamins added, formed and molded in starch moguls. As gummy candies became more popular, this plant and equipment was used to meet rising demand for those products as well.

In 1988, Farley took over the operations of Jaffe Candy, located in Compton, California, establishing a 50,000-square-foot (4,600 m^{2}) packaging and distribution center on the West Coast. Also in 1988, Farley's leased a 253,000-square-foot (23,500 m^{2}) warehouse distribution center in Bedford Park, Illinois. With four candy manufacturing plants and two distribution centers, Farley Candy Company was the second largest bag candy manufacturer in the United States and was the largest private label general line candy manufacturer.

In 1990, Farley purchased a 142,000-square-foot (13,200 m^{2}), former E.J. Brach's factory, located in Melrose Park, Illinois. This plant was used for a wide range of products, but primarily produced hard candies, eventually replacing the plant in Zion, Illinois and concentrating production facilities within a smaller radius of the company's warehouse/distribution center. One of the main products produced on state-of-the-art equipment at this plant was Starlight Mints, at a much lower cost than those from competitors such as E.J. Brach, for which it was a mainstay product.

In 1993, facing capacity shortages, Farley (which had changed its name to Farley Foods USA to allow for future expansion to products outside of confections) purchased a 144,000-square-foot (13,400 m^{2}) manufacturing plant in Oklahoma City, Oklahoma along with a 100,000-square-foot (9,300 m^{2}) warehouse in Moore, Oklahoma. These buildings had been the main production and warehouse facilities of the Bunte Candy Company. They were sold to the American Candy Company in 1990, which then sold them to Farley.

In 1994, Farley leased a 480,000-square-foot (45,000 m^{2}) warehouse and distribution center on 43rd Street in Chicago which was closer to expressways and to its major production facility at 31st Street. This new warehouse replaced the 253,000-square-foot (23,500 m^{2}) Bedford Park facility.

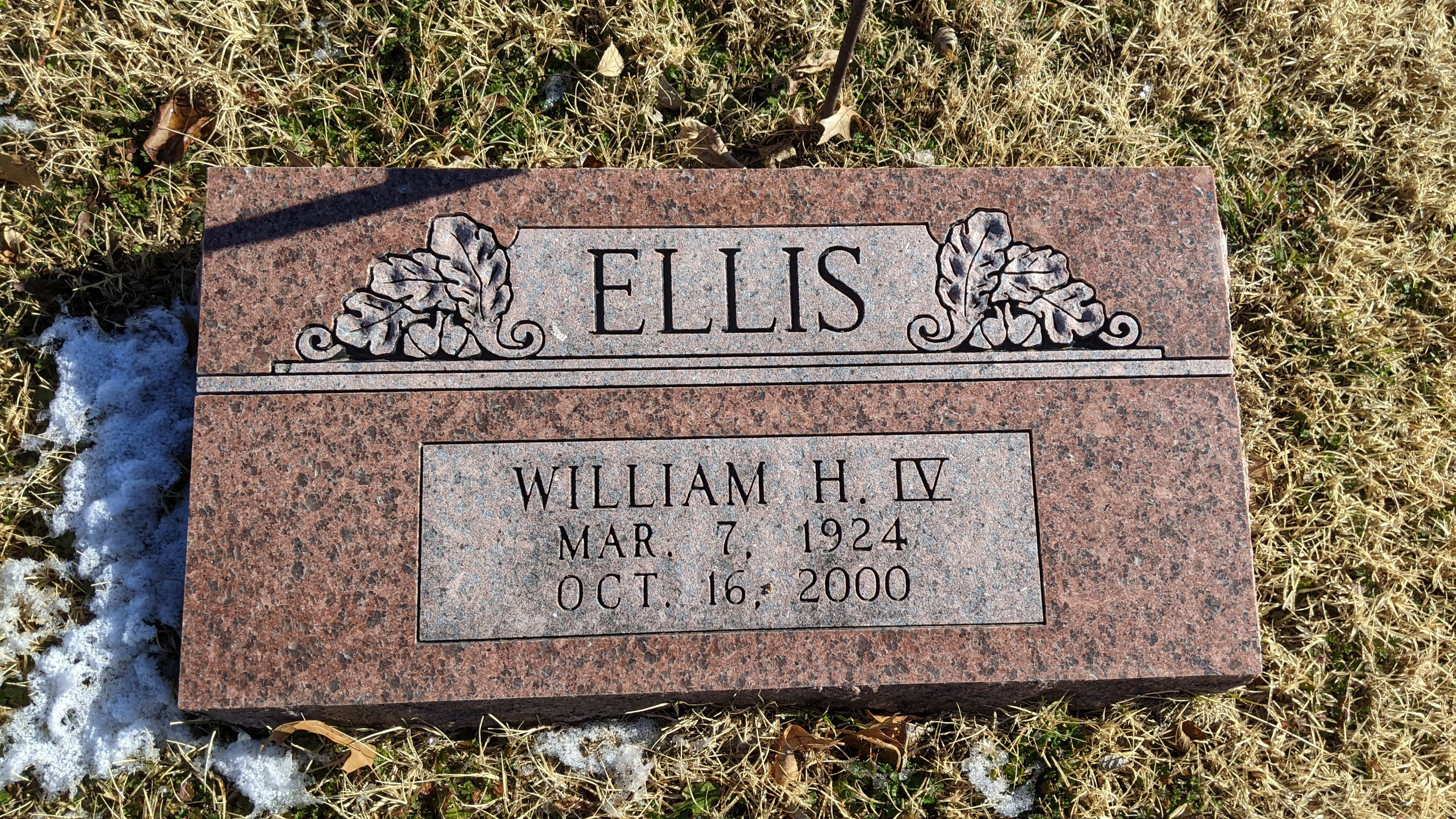
Mound City, Kansas Woodland Cemetery Ellis headstone

In September 1995, William Ellis received a heart transplant at age 71. In August 1996, Farley Foods was sold to Favorite Brands International with Ellis taking a 14.3% ownership stake in the new company.

=== Favorite Brands International ===
Farley and Sathers first came together under the Favorite Brands International name in 1996. Favorite Brands had been created a year earlier, in 1995, with the purchase of confectionery business units from Kraft Foods.

==== Kraft business lines acquisition ====
Favorite Brands International - Acquisitions(intercompany sales eliminated - million $'s)
Name	Date	Price	Sales
Kraft Marshmallow & Candy	September 25, 1995	$204	$151
Farley Foods	August 30, 1996	$204	$284
Sathers Candy & Trucking	August 30, 1996	$107	$166
Kidd & Company	August 30, 1996	$30	$33
Dae Julie & Candyland	January 27, 1997	$42	$56
Mederer U.S. - Trolli	April 1, 1997	$117	$62

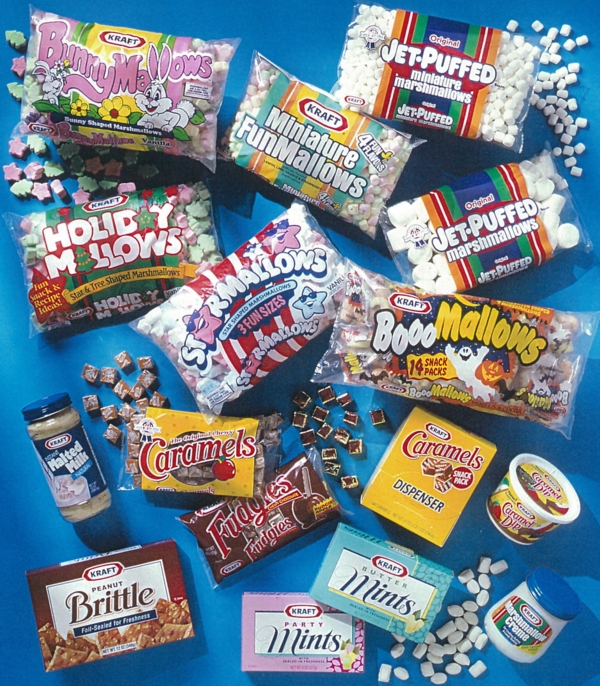
Favorite Brands was allowed to use the Kraft brand name for 2 years after the business was purchased. Beginning September 1, 1997, the use of the Kraft brand name was to end. This is a selection of Favorite Brands product showing the effect of the change.

Favorite Brands International (FBI) was formed in July 1995 to purchase the branded and private label caramel and marshmallow businesses from Kraft Foods for an estimated $204 million. It was funded with investments from the Texas Pacific Group (TPG) and InterWest Partners.

With the purchase of the Kraft business units, Favorite Brands became the largest manufacturer of marshmallows and the leading manufacturer of wrapped caramel products in North America. They also produced a significant percentage of the private label marshmallows sold. The Kraft caramel business enjoyed a market share greater than 50% at the time of the purchase, while the Kraft-branded marshmallows enjoyed a marketshare greater than 60%. In addition to consumer candy and marshmallows, Favorite Brands also acquired the industrial caramel and marshmallow businesses of Kraft. This business supplied the dehydrated marshmallows (with a 98% share of the market) marshmallow creme and caramel for use in breakfast cereals, instant hot chocolate mixes and taffy apples. Favorite Brands received film credit for supplying the truckloads of marshmallow creme used in the film What Dreams May Come.

With the acquisition came a confectionery manufacturing facility located in Kendallville, Indiana. Built in the 1920s and situated on 32 acres (130,000 m^{2}), this became the main manufacturing facility after 4 other Kraft marshmallow manufacturing lines were relocated from Buena Park, California, Canada and Garland, Texas (2 lines).

==== Sathers Candy and Farley Foods acquisitions ====
In 1996, Favorite Brands purchased the Sathers Candy Company and the Farley Food Company.

==== Kidd Marshmallows ====
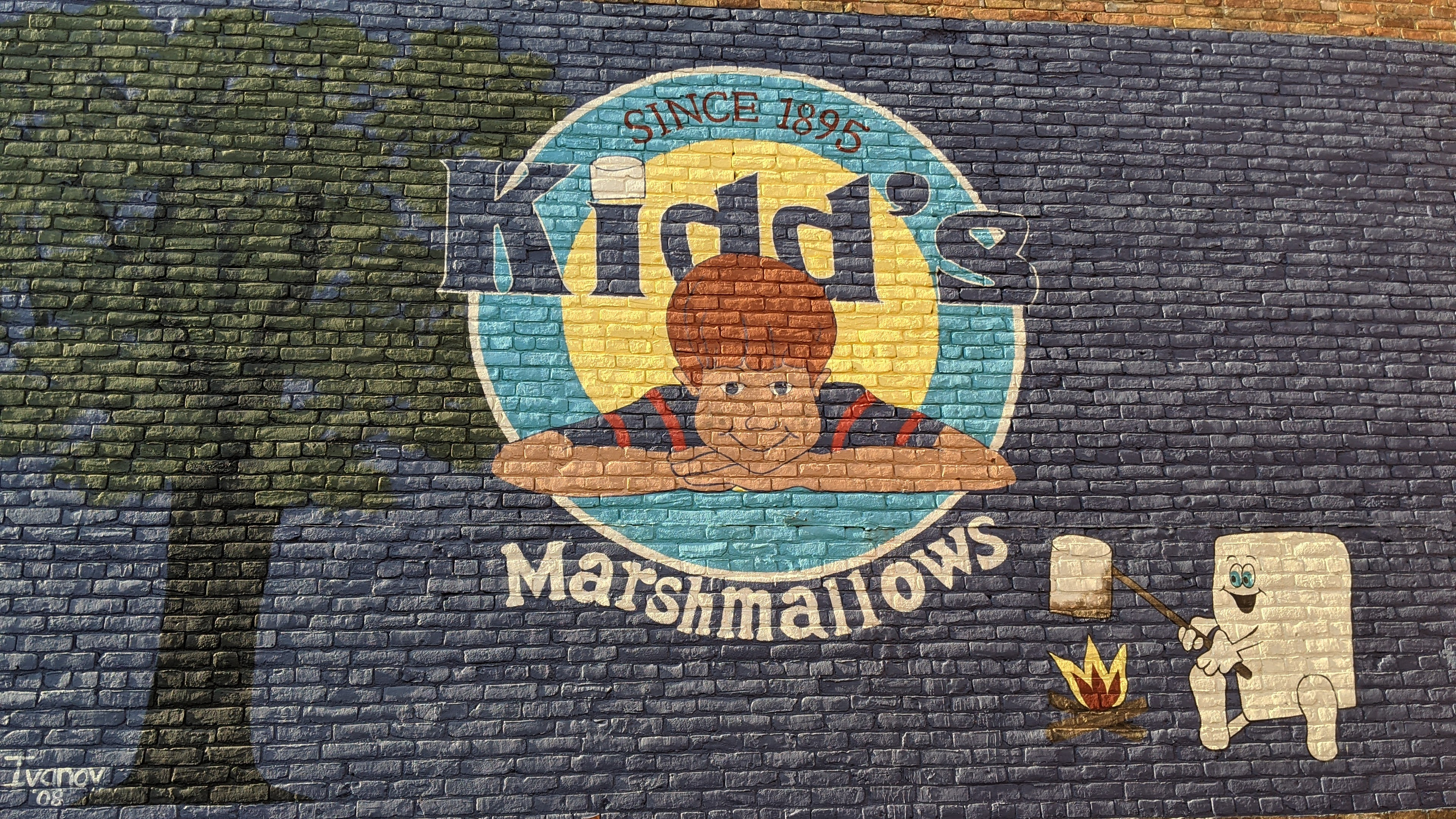
Kidd Marshmallows mural in Ligonier, Indiana

Also in 1996, Kidd & Company was purchased. Kidd was the second largest marshmallow and marshmallow creme manufacturer in the U.S. with sales of over $32 million in 1995. Favorite Brands had now purchased the top two marshmallow producers in North America.

Founded in 1895 by Albert Eugene Kidd, it initially produced a wide array of products including face powders, roasted peanuts and lemon drops. In 1917, the company began manufacturing marshmallows. By 1938 Kidd & Company had concentrated its focus on the marshmallow business, and especially marshmallow creme. It used a casting method of production, pouring marshmallows individually in molds. In 1947, they opened a 14,000-square-foot (1,300 m^{2}) plant in Ligonier, Indiana. In 1948, shortly after Kidd brought their new plant online, Alex Doumakes patented a new, more efficient process for producing marshmallows using extrusion. This method forced a rope of marshmallow through a die under pressure, which was then cut into the bite-sized pieces familiar today. Alex Doumakes later started his own marshmallow company. Kidd's plant was updated and expanded over the following years and ultimately grew to be 110,000 square feet (10,000 m^{2}). The Stay-Puft marshmallow bag props in Ghostbusters (1984) were produced by Kidd & Company.

In 1987, Kidd & Company built an additional plant west of the Rocky Mountains, in Henderson, Nevada. This plant was 118,000 square feet (11,000 m^{2}) and was destroyed on May 4, 1988, when the PEPCON rocket fuel plant located next to it exploded. Rebuilt with more space in 1989, it continued as the west coast manufacturing and distribution point for Kidd & Company, and became a popular tourist attraction due to its guided tours.

After Kidd & Company was sold to Favorite Brands International in 1996, the Ligonier plant was closed in 1996 and production moved to the former Kraft plant located less than 30 miles (48 km) away in Kendallville, Indiana. After Kraft gained control of Favorite Brands and the Kendallville and Henderson plants in 2000, they closed the Henderson plant in June 2001 and relocated the manufacturing equipment to Kraft's plant in Kendallville, Indiana. Today the specially designed building with its clean rooms is used by the Clark County Maintenance department.

Ligonier, Indiana celebrates its Kidd's Marshmallows production heritage by holding the Ligonier Marshmallow Festival every year since 1992, even though marshmallows are no longer produced there.

==== Dae Julie acquisition ====
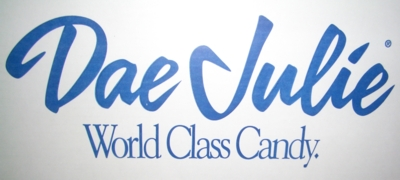

In early 1997, Dae Julie was purchased. Dae Julie was founded in 1963 as a candy importer by David Babiarz. In 1990, Mr. Babiarz went on to start a new business and built a new plant to support it. The new business registered as Candyland, and the new facility was a 120,000-square-foot (11,000 m^{2}) state-of-the-art manufacturing plant located in the Chicago suburb of Des Plaines, Illinois. The primary product focus of Candyland was Gummy candies for which demand was rapidly rising, though the starch-molding equipment could be used for a wide range of products. A trademark search revealed 30 other companies using the name Candyland, so the decision was made to use the Dae Julie name on Candyland products. At the time of its acquisition in early 1997 by Favorite Brands, it was considered one of the top Gummy manufacturers in the country, with annual sales of over $40 million (at manufacturer prices). Overall retail sales of Gummy products was estimated to be between $150 million and $175 million in the year of acquisition, with Nabisco's Gummi Savers accounting for $40 million of that total (at retail). Trolli, Farley Candy and Ferrara Pan were the other large producers at the time for the U.S. market.

==== North American Trolli acquisition ====
Later in 1997, the North American operations of Trolli Gummies was added.

Gummy Bears were originally developed by Hans Riegel Sr. of Bonn, Germany in 1922. He then started the Haribo (acronym for Hans Rigel, Bonn) company to produce the little rubber bears.

A different German candy company was started in 1948 by Willi Mederer. Originally the company was named Wilmed, but in 1975 the name was changed to Trolli. The company developed Gummy Worms in 1981 and sold them under the Trolli brand name, using a rainbow-haired Troll as their mascot. In 1986, to expand its market and lower its shipping costs, Mederer began producing Trolli-branded gummies in a plant located in the U.S. in Creston, Iowa.

Favorite Brands purchased the Trolli U.S. manufacturing facility in 1997 and licensed the Trolli name from Mederer for use in the United States. The license applies only to North American sales. An example of a different Trolli license holder is TREXCO.

===== Favorite Brands =====
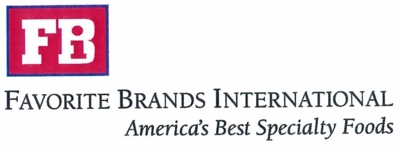

In 1995, Favorite Brands was formed to purchase the largest United States manufacturer of marshmallow products. Then, in 1996, it purchased the second-largest manufacturer of marshmallow products.

By the end of 1996, Favorite Brands enjoyed the number-one market position in branded marshmallow products, including the Jet-Puffed marshmallow brand, which had a 79% share of the branded marshmallow market and a 47% share of the total marshmallow market. In addition, Favorite Brands was the market leader in the ingredient marshmallow category, selling dehydrated marshmallow bits to every major cereal manufacturer in the United States, and was believed to have a 98% share of that market.

In 1996, Favorite Brands' Fruit Snack business held the number-two market position with a 22% market share and it was the second-largest general-line candy supplier in the United States. The Sathers product line was the leading brand sold in convenience stores across the country.

With the 1997 addition of Trolli and Dae Julie, Favorite Brands held the number two market position in the gummi market; Trolli having a 15% share.

By the end of 1997, Favorite Brands was the distant, fourth-largest confectionery company in the United States. At that time, only Hershey, Nestle and Mars were larger. However, Favorite Brands declared bankruptcy three years later.

The president and CEO of FBI, Al Bono, formerly CEO of California Gold Dairy Products of Petaluma, California, was quoted as saying: "Business is business, whether it's dairy or chocolate confections or selling lamps". David Bonderman, speaking for TPG which had invested $512 million in the venture, was later quoted to say that Favorite Brands was one of the worst investments his group had ever funded. Favorite Brands was TPG's first major investment in the food and beverage industry.

Before coming together under the Favorite Brands umbrella, the individual companies were mostly privately owned, with their owners taking a daily, hands-on interest in their operations. Under Favorite Brands' ownership, the companies were stripped of these owners and they were replaced with a management team that had little experience in confections or consolidating the operations of acquisitions. The first management group was replaced by an interim set of management. This interim management was then replaced within a year by still another group. The parallels with the recent experiences at E.J. Brach's (see section below) were striking: rapidly changing upper management - three CEOs in as many years; a disconnect with customers and their needs - reducing promotional support and product choice; a marked increase in overhead expenses, including a large office complex, as well as increased spending for financing and consultants.

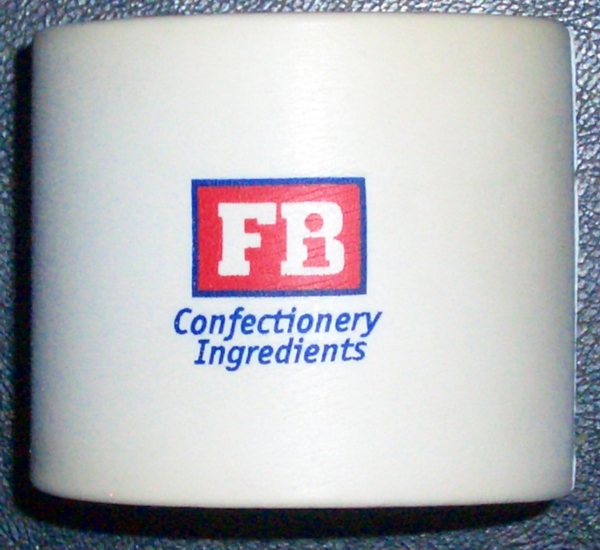
FBI was the market leader in the ingredient marshmallow category - dehydrated marshmallow bits that are used in cereals and hot beverages, selling bits to every major cereal manufacturer in the United States and believed to have a 98% share of that market.

The deal seems to have been structured so that the investors' options would remain open: one option being to hold the investment briefly and then flip it, either as a whole or by spinning off the acquired components. Another option was to take the company public. The stated option was to operate the companies so that their synergies could be tapped to reduce the costs of production and distribution sufficiently to offset the ongoing financing expenses associated with the formation of Favorite Brands. While Texas Pacific may have ultimately hoped to take the company public, it became apparent that Favorite Brands' rollup strategy was fundamentally flawed. The company paid too much for its assets and took on too much debt. The acquisitions did not mesh well together, having different operations, different products, and different customers-thus leading to severe difficulties in integrating the operations and achieving any benefits from the company's size. Systems and reporting were quickly integrated, but getting the various Operations, Sales, Marketing and Distribution components working together presented an ongoing problem. When key executives from acquired companies left, Favorite Brands lost an incalculable amount of trade relations and knowledge of the candy business, which had a debilitating effect on business. Some orders were now delivered late or only partially filled, providing an opening for competitors to seize all-important shelf space. Another common experience Favorite Brands shared with the travails which Brach's had endured was the loss of a well-known brand name; Favorite Brands was to lose the 'Kraft' name on its packaging effective October 1997. In addition, Favorite Brands' products were facing ever-increasing competition from competitors such as Brach's, including in the heretofore high-margin Fruit Snack and Gummi product lines.

As cash balances dwindled, Texas Pacific Group was asked to contribute additional funds for operations. It was not until 1998, three years after the formation of Favorite Brands and facing bankruptcy, that 12 surplus distribution centers were closed. Consultants from Bain, hired to explain the business to management and to help them plan a course of action also consumed millions of dollars of limited cash flow, while actually accomplishing little. Under prior private ownership, a layer of consultants explaining the business was rarely needed. Financing costs continued to be a drain on resources.

There was also a culture clash. The brands acquired from Kraft relied on a well-known brand name to drive sales. This culture did not mesh with the brands which sold product based on consumer value. This too was a problem which Brach's had faced, whether to pursue branded or commodity sales. The sales forces of Sathers, Farley's, and Trolli remained separate from those selling the former Kraft brands, never combining to handle "Favorite Brands" products for all customers. Again, there were few actual synergies realized under the combined umbrella of "Favorite Brands".

In the end, the continued separation of the acquired operations allowed them to be sold easily. Nabisco purchased Favorite Brands in November 1999, and by February 2000 had announced plans to close the headquarters, then located in Bannockburn, Illinois, and move the functions and duties to its own Parsippany, New Jersey headquarters. Nabisco was purchased itself in June 2000 and merged with Kraft. After the merger of Kraft and Nabisco, the components of Favorite Brands were sold off, absorbed, or held briefly for later disposal. The Farley and Sathers operations, which included plants, distribution centers and headquarters were sold, with the Farley's Fruit Snack line and production facility being retained. The Fruit Snack business line was eventually sold to Kellogg. Trolli was sold separately, with its plant and headquarters, to Wrigley in 2005. The marshmallow business was absorbed back into Kraft. Unfortunately, the value of the component pieces of Favorite Brands did not equal the price paid. Nabisco purchased Favorite Brands for $475 million in cash in 1999, far less than the approximately $700 million paid to acquire and fund operations of Favorite Brands by its investors.

=== Farley's and Sathers ===
Farley's and Sathers, as an independent company, was formed in January 2002 in Round Lake, Minnesota from assets purchased from Kraft Foods for a reported $50 million. At the time, 2001 sales of the brands and products acquired were estimated to be $220 million. Included in the sale were trademarks, Sathers Trucking and main distribution facility. Also included in the sale were six other facilities including three Farley production plants, one of which was actually the former Dae Julie plant located in Des Plaines, Illinois. Since then it has continued to acquire the brands and businesses of others.

==== Brands purchased from Hershey ====
===== Henry Heide Candy =====
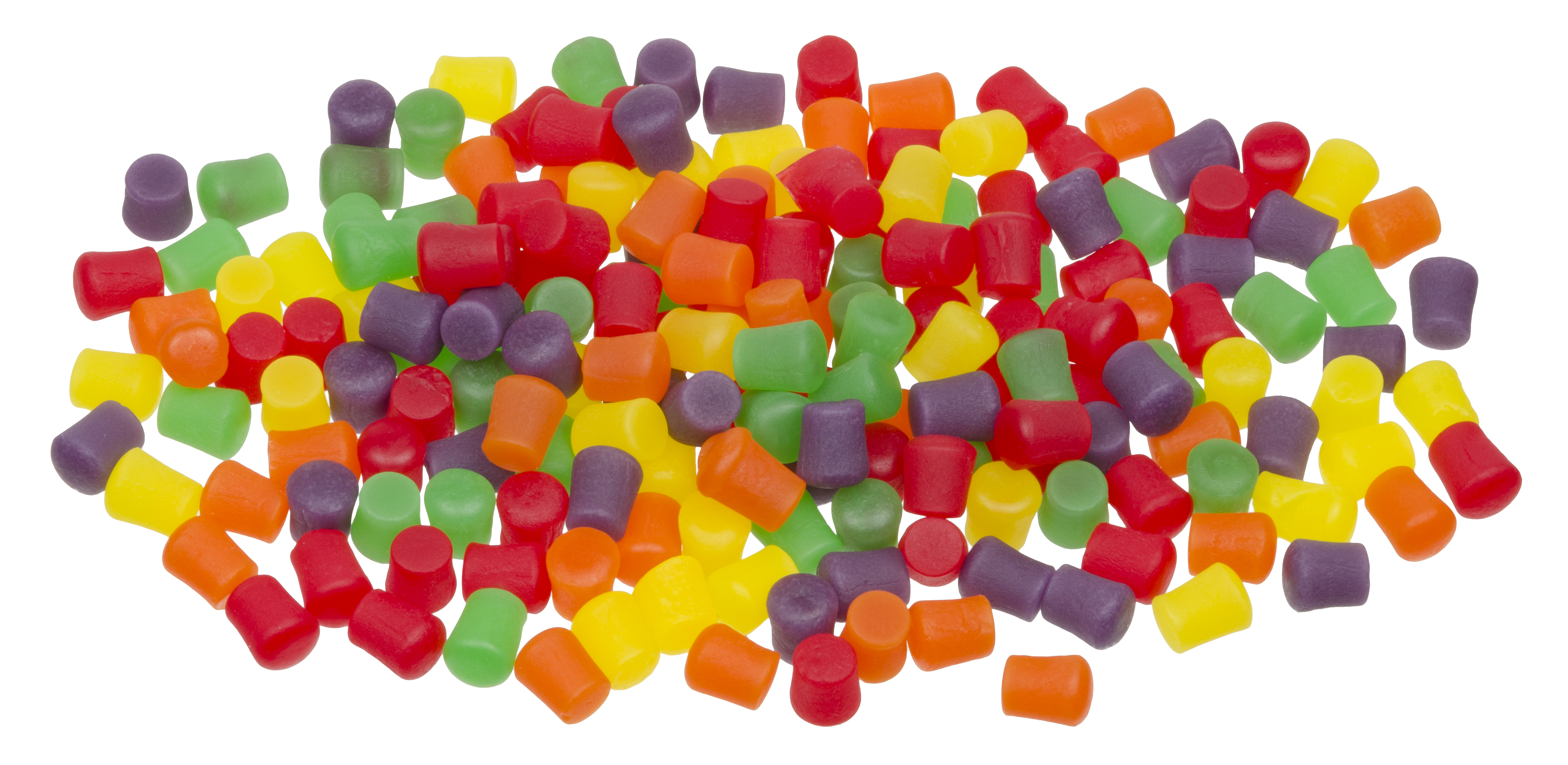
Jujube candy

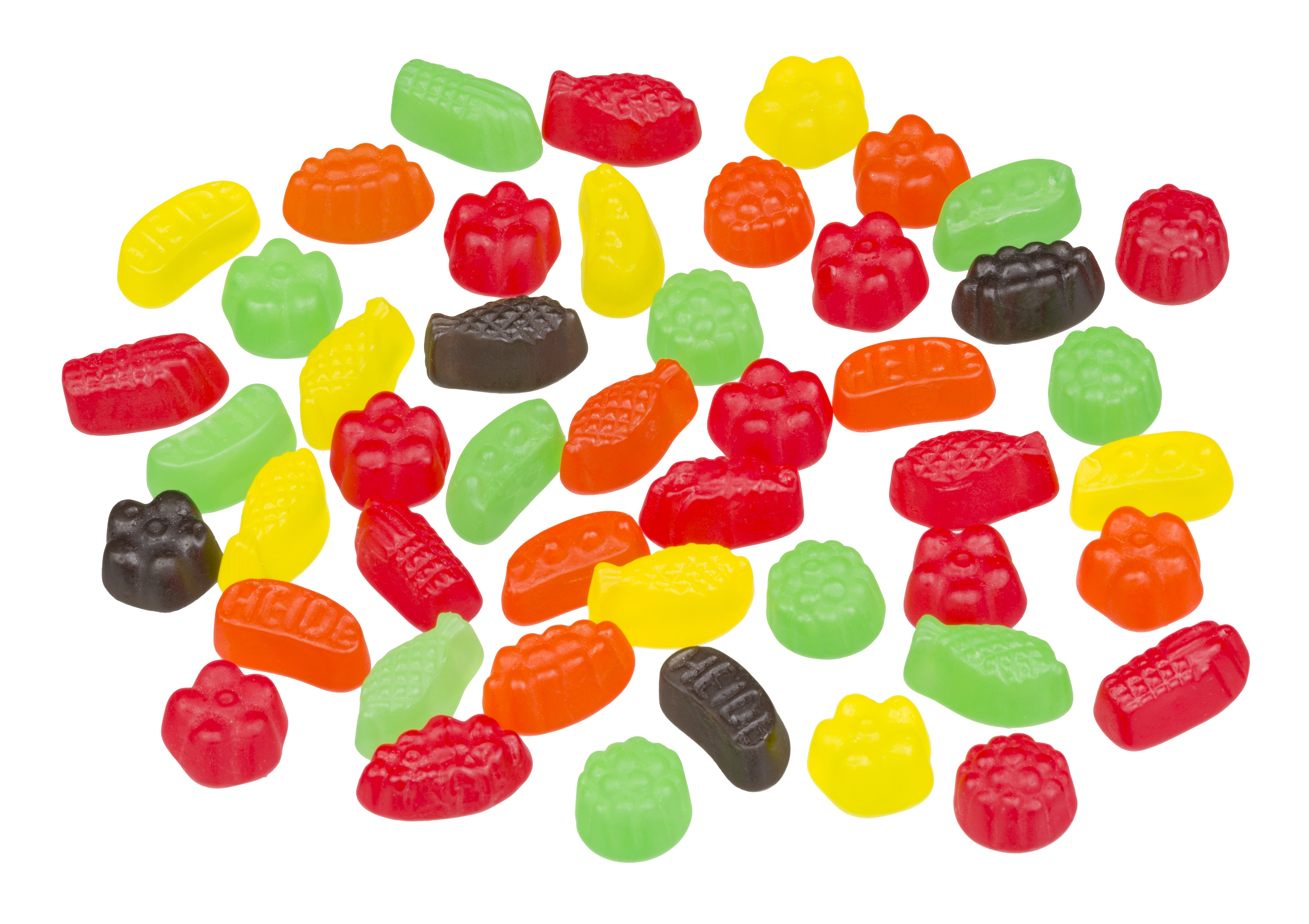
Jujyfruits candy

In May 2002, Farley & Sathers acquired several other brands from Hershey.

Known for products such as Jujyfruits, Jujubes, Dollars, and Gummi Bears, it was founded by its namesake Henry Heide in 1869. In 1920 "juju" candies were introduced: Jujyfruits and Jujubes. The only real difference between Jujubes and Jujyfruits, other than the shape, is that Jujubes use potato starch instead of corn starch as their primary thickener and Jujubes are cured longer, making them firmer.

Both candies originally used ju-ju gum as an ingredient, which is similar to many of the other vegetable gums such as gum arabic, acacia, agar or guar used within the confectionery industry. Ju-Ju gum comes from the jujube tree, which produces date-like fruits. Today, corn syrup is the primary ingredient. The Jujyfruits shapes are pineapple, tomato, raspberry, grape bundle, asparagus, banana, and pea pod. The banana shape is stamped with "HEIDE". Flavors include raspberry, licorice, lime, orange, and lemon.

In the 1930s, "Red Hot Dollars" were developed. "Red Hot" being 1930s slang for a "dollar". Hot cinnamon flavor was not available until after Farley's and Sathers purchased the brand from Hershey. Prior to that, the flavor had been a mild raspberry.

In 1995 Hershey purchased the New Brunswick, New Jersey–based Henry Heide Candy Inc. from the family. Farley and Sathers purchased the brands in June 2002 from Hershey, when they had an estimated $40 million in annual sales.

===== Chuckles =====
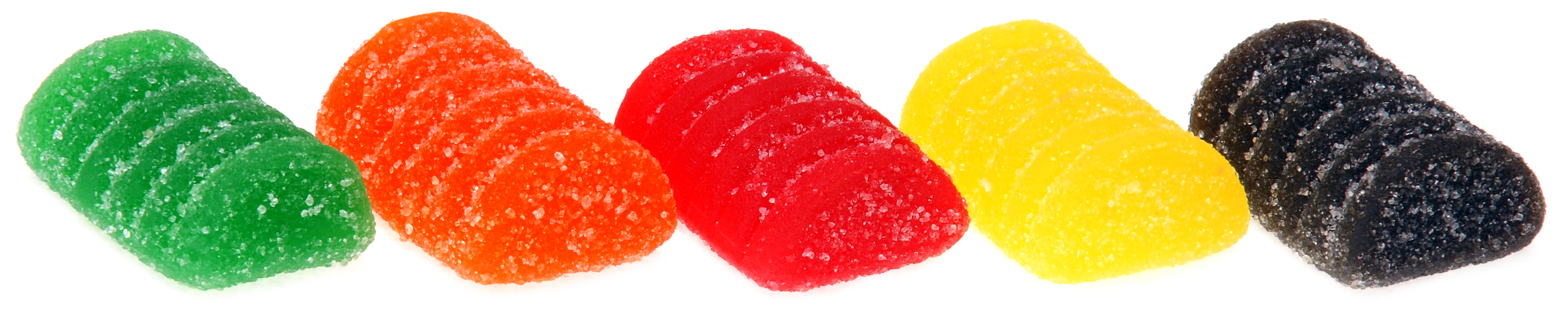
Chuckles

Also in May 2002, the new Farley & Sathers company acquired the Chuckles brand from Hershey.

Demonstrating once again the intertwined nature of the industry, Chuckles was developed by Fred W. Amend, who at one time worked for the Heide Candy Company. He began working for Henry Heide in 1875 in New York City, a period when Heide was concentrating on the production of almond paste. After a series of other jobs in the candy industry, he moved to Danville, Illinois in 1921 and started his own Amend Company to produce marshmallow. Later that same year he began producing a jelly candy. It was Fred's wife, Tulita, who suggested the name of the product. "All candy bars at that time were chocolate. But what if you didn't want chocolate? Our jelly bar was the answer." She dubbed them Chuckles because the name suggested enjoyment. Even during the Depression, when people couldn't afford more expensive treats, they bought Chuckles, she said.

The Amend Company was sold to Nabisco in 1970. In 1986, Nabisco sold the company and manufacturing plant to a newly formed company of local investors and former Nabisco employees for $10 million. The Chuckles brand name and licensing rights were sold separately to Leaf Inc., a unit of Huhtamaki Oy of Helsinki, Finland. The Danville production plant was renamed Tempo Confections and began manufacturing products under contract for others.

In 1996, Hershey acquired the Chuckles brand and license when it purchased Huhtamaki Oy's Leaf, Inc. confection business.

===== Amazin' Fruit =====
Purchased from Hershey in May 2002, this product was introduced by Hershey ten years earlier as a heavily promoted attempt to gain a foothold in the growing market for gummy candies. It was designed to compete with the Trolli brand as well as other gummy brands. It included real fruit juice (much like Farley fruit snacks) and came in bear shapes. Later the shapes were changed to fruit designs. During a cross-promotion with the film Jurassic Park: The Lost World dinosaur designs were sold as well.

==== Brands purchased from Kraft ====
===== Now and Later =====
Purchased from Kraft late in 2002, this product was introduced in 1962. The name was a suggestion for its customers that they eat some of the squares right away and save the rest for later. The old ad slogan for the candy was, "Eat some now, Save some for Later", later replaced by, "Hard 'N Fruity now and Soft 'N Chewy Later". The later slogan describing the candy's consistency over time.

Charles Cari learned to make toffee while working for W.F. Schrafft's & Sons in Boston. In 1919, Cari moved to New York to begin his own candy business in Brooklyn. He sold his business to father and son Harry and Joseph Klein in 1953 for $25,000. They named their company Phoenix Candy Company. At the time, their product line was salt water taffy, peanut brittle, and Halloween candy. It was a very seasonal business and concentrated mainly around Halloween. Now and Later was developed as a product which could be sold year-round. The Kleins invested in new equipment and technology and expanded distribution nationwide, growing the company to the point where production was running two shifts per day, six days per week.

The Kleins sold the Phoenix Candy Company to Beatrice Foods in 1978. In 1983, it was sold to Huhtamäki Oyj of Helsinki, Finland, which previously purchased the Leaf Candy Company. The two acquisitions were merged under the name Leaf, Inc. In turn, Leaf, Inc. sold the Phoenix Candy Company to Kouri Capital, a Finnish investment firm, who changed the name to Phoenix Confections in 1986. In 1992, Kouri sold Phoenix Confections to Nabisco and then in 2000 Kraft acquired the Now and Later brand as part of its purchase of Nabisco.

The original flavors were Red, Green and Blue. Under Beatrice Foods, these flavors became Strawberry, Apple and Grape.

===== Intense Fruit Chews =====
Purchased from Kraft late in 2002, this was originally part of Nabisco's Lifesavers brand of confections. Kraft gained control of this product when it purchased Nabisco in 2000.

==== Gum brands purchased from Hershey ====
===== RainBlo =====
RainBlo bubble gum was created by Leaf Confectionery in 1940; featuring an unusual hollow center, it was the first gumball to have flavoring inside. RainBlo was the first bubble gum that allowed chewers to blow colored bubbles. Along with several other Leaf brands, it was sold in 1967 to W.R. Grace, then was reacquired by Leaf in 1983. Huhtamaki Oy acquired RainBlo when it bought Leaf in 1983. Hershey then bought Leaf in 1996.

===== Fruit Stripe =====
Fruit Stripe was established in the early 1960s as Fruit Stripe Zebra, part of the Beech-Nut gum line. Fruit Stripe gum was purchased by Hershey in 2000 as part of a larger gum brand acquisition of Nabisco products.

===== Hot Dog! =====
Purchased from Hershey in 2003 as part of a four-brand gum purchase, Hot Dog! gum is a small sausage shaped gumball with either a cherry or (hot) cinnamon flavored shell. As a novelty item, it can often be found in ballparks and at hot dog stands.

===== Super Bubble =====
Super Bubble was developed by the Thomas Weiner Company shortly after World War II in the 1940s. The five-cent product was a huge success, but in the face of increased competition, the company brought out a one-cent version in 1948. General Mills acquired Super Bubble in 1969. The gum line was later sold to Leaf and was acquired by Hershey in the 1996 acquisition of Leaf.

==== Bobs Candies ====
Bob's Candies was a manufacturer of candy canes based in Albany, Georgia. Originally called the Famous Candy Company, the name was changed to the Mills-McCormack Candy Company when Bob Mills bought out the other investors and began working on the administrative side of the company. In 1924, the name was changed to Bobs' Candy. In 1933, the apostrophe was dropped and the company became known as Bobs Candy Company.

Initially, coconut, peanut, stick, and hard candies were sold, as well as taffy. Chocolate and pecan candies products were then added to the company's product line. Pecan candies, later were marketed as "Bobs Pe-Kons" and "Bobs Pe-Kon-ettes", became a mainstay product until World War II. On February 11, 1940, a tornado destroyed the factory but within six months, the plant was rebuilt and was producing again.

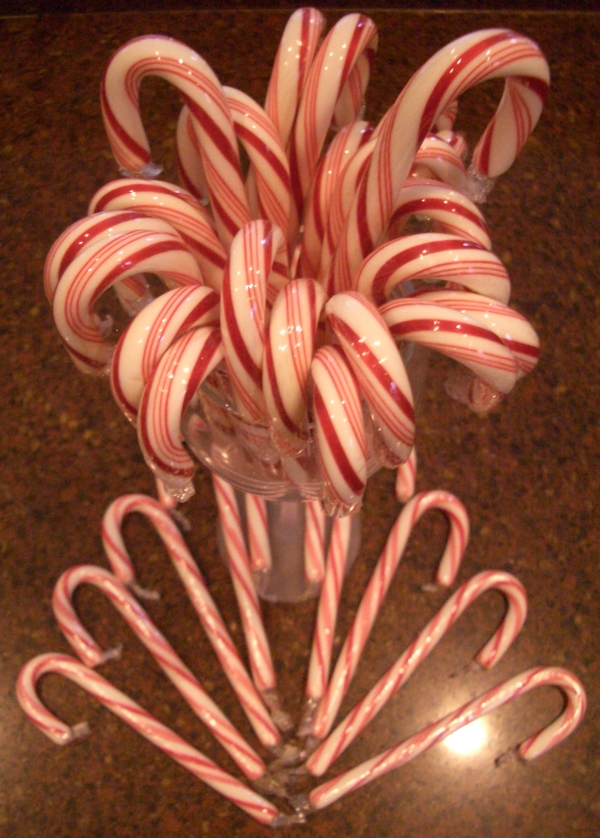

Hard candies were popular during the late 1940s, but high humidity in southern Georgia caused production, shipping and shelf-life problems. Production issues were addressed in 1946 by installing large air conditioners to de-humidify the company's wrapping room. Shelf-life and shipping issues were addressed in 1949 with a new machine that sealed candy stick in moisture-proof wrappers. Increasing production rates via automating the production was accomplished with a creation of Father Harding Keller, a Roman Catholic priest of the Diocese of Little Rock, and McCormack's brother-in-law. Fr. Keller first invented a machine to dispense ribbons of peanut butter on the company's peanut butter crackers. In 1950, Keller invented a machine that twisted soft candy into the spiral striping that defined the look of candy canes and then cutting the canes in precise lengths. Fr. Keller patented his invention, the Keller Machine. Fr. Keller and his machine gained national fame in the 1960s when he was a contestant on the popular TV show What's My Line.

Bobs Candy occupied approximately 100,000 square feet (9,300 m^{2}) spread across 6 buildings in downtown Albany. In 1967, construction began on a new 130,000-square-foot (12,000 m^{2}) facility that doubled the production capacity of the company. This new facility was expanded several times, and by the end of the 1970s had doubled production capacity yet again.

In 1984, a second production facility was opened in Kingston, Jamaica. The 13,000-square-foot (1,200 m^{2}) plant produced unwrapped, pure-sugar stick candy.

In 1985, Bobs Candies acquired a competitor, Fine Candy, which had $4 million in annual sales at the time.

In 1994 another 175,000 square feet (16,300 m^{2}) was added to the Georgia production facility to address capacity issues.

By 2001, Bobs Candies was producing 500 million candy canes per year at its Georgia facility. Half of that production was moved to Mexico between 2001 and 2004 to take advantage of lower sugar prices outside the United States.

In 2005, Farley and Sathers acquired Bobs Candy Company. By the end of 2005, all of the Albany, Georgia operations of Bobs Candy had been shut down and all production was moved to production facilities in Mexico.

==== North American Trolli re-acquisition ====
As a component of Favorite Brands, Trolli became part of Nabisco in 1999, then part of Kraft in 2000.

In 2004, under Kraft ownership, Trolli introduced a gummi candy in the shape of chickens, squirrels, and snakes with tire tracks on them, making them to appear as though they'd been run over by a vehicle. Marketed as Roadkill candy, animal rights activists spoke out about the candy in an effort to get it off of the market. The product was taken off store shelves and discontinued.

In 2005, Kraft sold Trolli to Wrigley as part of a $1.48 billion offloading of candy businesses. Included in the sale to Wrigley were such iconic brands as Altoids and Lifesavers, in addition to smaller, local brands such as Trolli. Wrigley subsequently sold off Trolli from this group to Farley and Sathers Candy in the same year.

==== Brach and Brock Candy ====
===== Brock Candy Company =====
William E. Brock settled down in Chattanooga, Tennessee, in 1906 and bought a small wholesale grocery shop, which sold candy produced on the premises by the Trigg Candy company. This candy operation consisted of handmade penny and bulk candies, peanut brittle, peppermints and fudge. The name was changed to Brock Candy in 1909.

In the early 1920s, a major expansion occurred when the company modernized its 120,000-square-foot (11,000 m^{2}) factory with the installation of automatic (starch) moguls. Brock then eliminated all slab-produced products such as peanut brittle and fudge and concentrated on jelly and marshmallow candies, which were produced, in his new mogul equipment. Later in the decade, Brock became one of the first candy manufacturers to package its products in cellophane bags. In the 1930s, Brock introduced what would become one of its biggest sellers for the next 60 years, Chocolate Covered Cherries. In the 1940s, during World War II, Brock introduced the Brock Bar, a coated nut roll using corn syrup and peanuts, during a period when sugar was strictly rationed.

In the 1950s, Brock added 60,000 square feet (5,600 m^{2}) to its plant in downtown Chattanooga. By the end of the decade though, additional space for expansion was needed, so a 30-acre (120,000 m^{2}) site on the outskirts of Chattanooga was purchased. On this site in 1964, Brock added a 64,000-square-foot (5,900 m^{2}) distribution center, expanding the warehouse another 25,000 square feet (2,300 m^{2}) by the end of the 1960s.

In 1976, the company moved its production to a new facility on its 30-acre (120,000 m^{2}) site on the outskirts of Chattanooga.

In 1978, the Brock Candy Company purchased the Winona, Minnesota, candy company, Schuler Chocolates. Located in a cooler and less humid area of the country, the Schuler Chocolates company itself was an amalgam of several candy companies, including the maker of the Chicken Dinner candy bar, originally created by Milwaukee-based Sperry Candy Company. The name was meant to convey a sense of wealth and prosperity à la "a chicken in every pot" (another of Sperry's big sellers was the Club Sandwich bar.) Sperry was bought out by Pearson's Candy in 1962; in 1967 it was sold to Schuler Chocolates (which itself was the originator of the corn-flake-spiked Duck Lunch bar). Schuler Chocolates also owned the Milky Way bar, which at its core, is made with a variant of Minnesota nougat developed by candymakers in the early decades of the 20th century, before selling the rights to the Mars Candy Company.

In the 1980s, Brock added gummy candies and fruit snacks to its product offerings. It also began contract and industrial production of its fruit based products.

In 1990, Brock purchased the Shelly Brothers, Inc. candy company of Souderton, Pennsylvania, which held a 1966 patent for molding traditional clear candy. In 1993, Brock bought a 30% share in Clara Candy of Dublin, Ireland with plans for expansion into the European market. By then, Brock had become a publicly traded company, with an initial public offering of 2.3 million shares for almost 63% of the company's stock.

===== E.J. Brach's Candy =====
Founded in 1904 by Emil Brach, he invested his life savings, $1,000, in a storefront candy store. He named it "Brach's Palace of Sweets" and it was located at the corner of North Avenue and Towne Street in Chicago, Illinois. With his sons Edwin and Frank, he started with one kettle. Investing in additional equipment he was able to lower his production costs and sell his candy for 20 cents per pound, well below the more typical 50 cents per pound his competitors were charging. By 1911 his production had reached 50,000 pounds per week.

By 1923, Brach had four factories operating at capacity. Brach then invested $5 million in a new factory, beginning construction in 1921. It was designed by Alfred S. Alschuler, built at 4656 West Kinzie Street, and consolidated production into one building. At the time, they were producing 127 different varieties of candy and had a capacity of 2,225,000 pounds per week. Over the years, this new plant was expanded and investments in new processes and equipment were made, including its own chocolate grinding plant and a large panning operation. In 1948, after an electrical spark ignited corn starch, a massive explosion on the plant's third floor killed 11 employees and injured 18. Much of the factory's north side was destroyed. Reconstruction brought the plant's capacity up to more than 4 million pounds of product per year, and it employed 2,400 workers, in 2,200,000 square feet (200,000 m^{2}). It was recognized as the largest candy manufacturing plant in the world at the time. At its peak, 4,500 employees worked there. The plant was eventually abandoned in 2003 when new owners took over operations and production was moved primarily to Mexico. In August 2007, An administrative building was blown up for the filming of The Dark Knight, with the rest of the complex being demolished in 2014 and currently remaining as parking space.

Prior to World War II, Brach's produced several candy bars, including a chocolate-covered, honeycombed, peanut butter Swing Bar as well as a mint and almond nougat bar. After the war Brach's concentrated on bulk and bagged candies. It was in the period after the war that Halloween Trick or Treating became a popular activity. Brach's promoted its candy corn and other fall-themed candies, available in single-serve, pre-packaged packets.

In 1958 Brach's introduced the Pick-A-Mix concept. Customers could choose from a wide selection of products, scooping items of their choosing, and paying one price per pound. This was adapted from the barrels seen in general stores at the time. This concept brought the dying experience of buying candy at the local corner store into the new merchandisers, the supermarkets.

In 1966, American Home Products Corporation purchased the company. In 1986, the last year of ownership by American Home Products, it accounted for two-thirds of the U.S. market for bagged candy and 7% of the $9 billion U.S. candy market. It employed 3,700 and had an estimated pretax profit of more than $75 million on sales of $640 million.

In 1987 Jacobs Suchard Limited, a Swiss chocolate and coffee conglomerate, purchased the company for $730 million and by the end of 1989, it was in serious trouble. Losses that year were an estimated $50 million and sales had decreased to $470 million. By 1993, sales had dropped to $400 million though losses were reduced somewhat to $26 million. All this occurred during a period when overall per capita candy consumption in the U.S. had increased 25%. By May 1994, after seven years of Suchard ownership, Brach's had had nine different CEOs, moved its headquarters from the plant property to a penthouse office in one of Chicago's wealthiest suburbs, saw a loss of nearly 900 jobs (42% of the workforce at that time), and suffered a loss of key customers and market share.

Klaus Jacobs almost immediately fired Brach's top officers and gutted the leadership of its sales, marketing, production and finance departments. Some of these positions were filled with executives from Suchard's European operations; people with little experience in the candy industry (see: Favorite Brands above). Former executives cited Jacobs Suchard's autocratic management style and inability to recognize the difference between American and European candy consumption habits. The name of the company was changed to Jacobs Suchard Inc., a name few retailers or consumers recognized and product lines were trimmed from 1,700 to 400 in an attempt to cut costs. This alienated many of its largest customers, including Walgreens and Walmart, who found other sources, including Farley Candy. In addition to the cuts in product selection, Brach's also chose to curtail holiday promotional activities.

In 1990, Phillip Morris purchased Jacobs Suchard for $3.8 billion, except for its U.S. subsidiary, E. J. Brach Corp. A holding company named Van Houten & Zoon Holding AG was formed by Klaus Jacobs to run Brach and other businesses. Disagreements with Klaus Jacobs on marketing and management strategies continued, particularly over commodity vs. branded (Brach's) products. In 1993 alone, Brach's saw 3 different CEO's, and continued to experience a high rate of turnover and dismissals within the sales and marketing departments. Many of Brach's sales personnel left to work for its competitors.;

In September 1994, E.J. Brach's purchased the Brock Candy Company of Chattanooga for $140 million, a year in which Brock Candy had sales of $112 million and profits of $6.5 million. This was the second attempt by the two companies to join. The first time had been while E.J. Brach's was under American Home Products ownership. The merger attempt at that time was canceled due to concerns of an antitrust suit.

For a time the new company operated as the Brach and Brock Candy Company. This was later changed to Brach's Confections.

In 2003, Barry Callebaut AG purchased the new company. The principal owner of Brach's, KJ Jacobs AG, was also a majority stakeholder in Barry Callebaut. As part of the deal, Barry Callebaut agreed to assume $16 million in debt, fund restructuring efforts for five years and paid a symbolic $1 (one dollar) for the company.

===== Brach's Confections acquisition =====
On September 17, 2007, Barry Callebaut AG announced its intention to sell Brach's Confections to Farley's & Sathers. The acquisition was completed on November 16, 2007, for an undisclosed amount. Barry Callebaut AG shares rose over 1 percent on the day the deal was announced, outperforming weaker markets that day. "We think the Brach's disposal is a very positive move, as it will greatly improve the group and consumer division margins", said Vontobel analyst Rene Weber. Weber also estimated that Barry Callebaut had not made a gain on the sale and estimated that Brach's was worth some 30 million francs on its books (approximately US$16 million). "The purchase price will be no higher than that, meaning no extraordinary gain for the company", Weber said. At the time, Brach's had been struggling with rising competition and a stalling candy market in the U.S. Their annual gross sales were approximately $270 million, with sugar candy making up around 75 percent of revenue and chocolate products accounting for around 25 percent.

The acquisition expanded Farley's & Sathers' product portfolio and manufacturing operations, including Brach's existing fruit snack business, chocolate products and other general-line candy products.

In 2008, the first year for the newly expanded company, sales were reported to be $590 million.

==== Ferrara Pan Candy ====
The company lasted until the third generation of the Ferrara family before being sold. The founder, the grandfather, Salvatore Ferrara, came from Nola, Italy to New York in 1899 at the age of 15. The Ferrara family had been bakers in Italy. In 1908 he opened a bakery at 772 W. Taylor, in the heart of Chicago's "Little Italy" neighborhood. He sold candy-coated almonds known as "confetti" (also known as Jordan almonds), a popular treat at Italian weddings. When candy sales became greater than pastries, Ferrara partnered with two brothers-in-law, Salvatore Buffardi and Anello Pagano. They built a two-story brick building at 2200 W. Taylor and began producing a variety of panned candies.

The second floor of the building was devoted to the revolving kettles that produced the pan candy, with all of the machines being driven by a giant wheel. The candy was dropped to the shipping department below through a hole in the floor.

Nello Ferrara, the second generation of the family in the business, served as a military attorney and was involved with the war crimes trials in Japan in 1946. It was his visit to that devastated country that inspired the creation of Atomic Fireballs in 1954. 15 million are consumed weekly.

The company moved to a former dairy in Forest Park in 1959 where it remains to this day.

Salvatore II, the third generation, provided the inspiration for the Lemonhead name when his grandfather, Salvatore Ferrara saw his baby grandson after delivery. Salvatore II was a forceps baby and he noted that his new grandson's head was lemon-shaped. Lemonhead candies were introduced in 1962. Ferrara now makes 500 million Lemonheads per year.

With the success of Lemonheads, the company expanded the fruit candy line with Cherry Chan, packaged in a box with a picture of a mustachioed, sinister-looking Asian. Alexander the Grape and Mister Melon soon followed. Bowing to some protest, and to create a common naming convention for the similar products, the names were changed: to Cherryheads, Grapeheads, and Melonheads, respectively.

In addition to the above products, Ferrara also produced Jawbreakers, Boston Baked Beans, Red Hots (cinnamon imperials), Long Fellers (panned licorice pieces), Gr-r-r-oats, and a minty chewing gum called Try-umph.

In addition to sales of their own products, Ferrara Pan also acted as a distributor for products such as Kraft Toblerone chocolates. When Kraft ended that relationship in 2008, Ferrara invested more than $20 million in 2009 to develop and distribute its own version of a product with very similar packaging and characteristics of the lost Toblerone line. This product is no longer available.

The son of Salvatore Ferrara II, the fourth generation, was seen as the successor of his father at the business. The son, named for his grandfather Nello, was a minor league hockey player, with a desk in the company's headquarters.

Leslie Dashew, a partner with the Aspen Family Business Group and author of "The Keys to Family Business Success," said succession planning from founder to second generation is particularly challenging but can be hard for any generation, particularly if the leader becomes "very identified with the business."

Such leaders, she said, "talk the talk and say, 'This a family business, we have members working here.' But they don't operate that way. It's like it's their fiefdom."

That may be fine for shareholders if the business is doing well. - "If you go through tough economic times, people may question that very powerful leader," Dashew said. "If things are going well, they might say, 'He's a genius.' But if they're not, (shareholders) may question things that were taken for granted, and then the power base is questioned."

Another common problem is separating personal and professional relationships.

"There are disparate value systems in the world of business and in the world of family," said Paul Karofsky, CEO of Transition Consulting Group. "In family, we're expected to grant unconditional love and appreciate each other and value each other for who they are, and in business we value for what they do and how well they do it."

These value systems are "inherently incompatible," Kanofsky said. "And, as a result, this is one of the reasons why family businesses face so many more complex issues than nonfamily enterprises."

He added that "survival to the fourth or fifth generation is remarkable."

After a century in operation, the number of family members controlling the company had increased, along with differing priorities regarding dividends, capital appreciation, roles for relatives, and influence within the business. Reconciling these interests became a central factor in negotiations over the company’s sale.

===== Ferrara Pan Candy acquisition =====
In May 2011 Salvatore Ferrara II was asked to leave a board meeting. Police were called and Mr. Ferrara left voluntarily. Mr. Ferrara then called the police himself when he noted that the board had apparently re-convened without him. In the summer of 2011, Mr. Ferrara broached the idea of a merger to Liam Killeen, then CEO of Farley's & Sathers.

In May 2012 the Ferrara Pan Candy brands were added to the existing Farley's & Sathers roster of brands. The acquisition was partially funded with a $425 million term loan due in June 2018. In addition, $330 million in additional equity was contributed by Catterton Partners and Ferrara Pan Candy. In addition to the term loan and equity contributions, a $125 million line of credit was opened, due in 2017.

In May 2013 Moody's downgraded the loan due to concerns that the highly leveraged company was experiencing lower than projected sales volumes, higher distribution costs, and delays in achieving the synergies needed.

Shortly after the acquisition it was announced that the former Sathers headquarters in Round Lake, Minnesota (population, less than 400), which had employed over 200 workers in 2010, would be closed and that the new headquarters would be located in Oakbrook Terrace, Illinois. Also slated for closing was one of two facilities located in Chattanooga, Tennessee, which traced its history back to Brock Candy. The Sathers Trucking business was also scheduled to cease operations.

In July 2012 a 10-year lease was signed for space on multiple floors (25th and 27th) of a 31-story office tower in Oakbrook Terrace (the tallest in the Western suburbs of Chicago).

In an interview with the new CEO, Salvatore Ferrara II, it was stated that at the time of acquisition, Ferrara Pan had $350 million in annual sales and that Farley's & Sathers had $650 million, for a combined total of $1 billion.

Per Moody's, pro-forma revenues for the twelve months ended December 31, 2012, were approximately $823 million.

In February 2014 Mr. Ferrara announced his resignation as CEO of the company, ending 106 years of family control of the business. The information was publicly released in the following month.

In May 2014 the company's debt was again downgraded by Moody's, due largely to the company's weak financial metrics, which included high leverage and a weakened liquidity profile. Operating performance in FY13 was well below Moody's expectations, who also noted that synergy savings are taking longer than expected to be realized. Relatively weak profit margins and negative free cash flow-to-debt also contributed to the downgrade.

In March 2015, the company added $40 million to its $425 million term loan, bringing the amount due in June 2018 to $465 million. Moody's rated this a Moderate Credit Negative, but did not change its overall rating of the debt. Net sales (unaudited) for the 12 months ended December 31, 2014, were reported to be $870 million.

Revenue for 2016 was reported to be $859 million.

In 2017, additional cuts in facilities and employees were announced, including the closing of the Trolli manufacturing plant in Creston, Iowa (which had been fined numerous times for OSHA violations and cited for failure to pay employees for overtime hours); the plant was the third largest employer in the small town. Also, additional job cuts at the distribution center in Bolingbrook, Illinois were announced.

== Ferrara Candy, née Farley's & Sathers, today ==
Ferrara Candy is a candy manufacturing company headquartered in Oakbrook Terrace, Illinois. Ferrara Candy currently operates 4 manufacturing plants, 2 in the US and 2 in Mexico, as well as 2 distribution centers in the US, 1 in Illinois and 1 in Texas near the border with Mexico.

The company sells 92% of all mellowcremes in the US; it is the largest producer of candy canes; the largest seller of conversation hearts; produces virtually all of the jelly beans that are consumed in the United States. The company has 21 starch moguls, of 40 in the US as a whole. The company has between 700 and 800 pans operating at any given time. It is believed that no other US company has more than 150. It is claimed that the company produces a million pounds of gummy candy per week in 4 manufacturing plants — 2 in the US and 2 in Mexico. The company employs approximately 3,000 people.

Culled from the efforts and innovations of numerous individuals who built and grew their products, processes, and companies; at their combined peaks these production companies had once utilized more than 5,000,000 square feet (460,000 m^{2}), and employed more than 10,000, workers. Today the company is a set of brand names and marketing programs.

== Ferrero purchases Ferrara ==
Ferrero SpA, a privately held company headquartered in Luxembourg, best known for its Nutella, Fannie May, and Tic Tac brands in the US, purchased Ferrara at the end of October 2017. Purchase price was not disclosed but was believed to be $1.3 billion, including debt.

== Timeline ==
- 1860s Henry Heide Candy Company begins business
- 1890s Farley Candy Company established
- 1900s Brach's Candies begins production in the backroom of a Chicago store. Brock's Candy of Chattanooga begins production of penny candies, peanut brittle and jelly candies.
- 1920s Bobs Candies is formed
- 1930s Sathers Candy Company begins operations
- 1960s Dae Julie begins business as an importer, later as a manufacturer
- 1980s Trolli Gummis begins production in the U.S.
- 1994 Brach's Candy purchases a controlling interest in Brock's Candy of Chattanooga
- 1995 Favorite Brands International created with purchase of Kraft Caramel, Marshmallow, Dinner Mints and Peanut Brittle businesses. Henry Heide, Inc is sold to Hershey Foods.
- 1996 Favorite Brands International acquires Farley Foods, Sathers Candy and Kidd Marshmallow businesses
- 1997 Favorite Brands International acquires Dae Julie and the Trolli Gummi businesses
- 1999 Nabisco buys Favorite Brands International
- 2000 Nabisco is merged with Kraft Foods by Phillip Morris
- 2002 L Catterton Partners form Farleys & Sathers Candy Company made up of assets from the former Farley Foods, Sathers Candy Company, and the Kraft Taffy business from Kraft; Chuckles and several other Henry Heide brands purchased from Hershey Foods.
- 2003 L Catterton Partners continues its acquisitions with the purchase of four old-line gum lines from Hershey Foods.
- 2005 L Catterton Partners buys the Trolli Gummi business, which had been part of the Favorite Brands group of products, from Wm. Wrigley Jr. Company, which had acquired it as part of a larger group of businesses from Kraft. Bob's Candies is acquired.
- 2007 L Catterton Partners buys the Brach & Brock Candy Company
- 2012 L Catterton Partners buys the Ferrara Pan Candy Company and renames the new entity Ferrara Candy
- 2017 L Catterton sells company to Ferrero SpA
