= Hitschler (company) =

German confectionery manufacturer

Hitschler International GmbH & Co. KG
- Founded: 1929
- Headquarters: Hürth-Kalscheuren, Rhein-Erft-Kreis, North Rhine-Westphalia, Germany
- Revenue: 58 million (2021)
- Owner: Philip Hitschler-Becker (managing director)
- Number of employees: approx. 150 (2018)
- Website: hitschies.de

Hitschler International GmbH & Co. KG is a German confectionery manufacturer based in Hürth near Cologne.

== History ==
Ferdinand Hitschler, the father of Karl Walter Hitschler, began trading tobacco and cachous in Cologne-Klettenberg in the late 1920s. In the mid-1930s, he founded the company Hitschler's Cachou which in 1946 was renamed to Ferdinand Hitschler & Sohn (Ferdinand Hitschler & Son). After the death of Ferdinand Hitschler in 1953, Walter Hitschler renamed the company once again to Hitschler International. In the 1950s, chewing gum was produced for Hitschler in the 1st German chewing gum factory, which was later taken over and expanded by Hitschler. In July 2010, the founder's son, who had run the company, died at the age of 88. For seven years, the management was taken over by managers who were not members of the founding family. In 2014, Hitschler was ranked 4th in terms of brand strength in the brand ranking of fruit gums, behind Haribo, Storck's and Katjes and ahead of Trolli and Frigeo.

Since November 2017, the company has been managed by the great-grandson of the company's founder, Philip Hitschler-Becker. In 2020, the headquarters were moved from Cologne to the city limits in Hürth-Kalscheuren; the brand was renamed hitschies in 2021.

The company had a turnover of 58.0 million euros in 2021. One production site is located in Michelstadt in the Odenwald in Hesse.

== Product range ==
The product range consists mainly of chewy candies, chewy candy dragees, fruit gums, chewing gum, wafers with fizzy filling and foam sugar products. Some products do not contain gelatine. From 2023, the company plans to produce completely gelatine-free.
