= Bubble Yum =

Brand of bubble gum introduced in 1974

- Product type: Bubble gum
- Current owner: The Hershey Company
- Produced by: The Hershey Company
- Country: United States
- Introduced: 1974; 52 years ago
- Markets: Worldwide
- Previous owners: Life Savers; Nabisco
- Tagline: Keeps it Poppin; The Number Yum Taste in bubble gum
- Website: hersheyland.com/bubbleyum

Bubble Yum is a brand of bubble gum marketed by The Hershey Company.

== History ==
In 1974, the Life Savers company first sold Bubble Yum in test markets in the Western U.S. National distribution began in 1976.

The next year, rumors began to spread that the gum's softness and ease of chewing were due to the addition of spider eggs. The Life Savers Company addressed the issue with an official full-page rebuttal printed in prominent U.S. newspapers (including The New York Times), to dispel the rumor and restore public confidence. Sales of the gum soon surpassed sales of Life Savers candy, and it became the most popular bubble gum brand. Nabisco bought Life Savers in 1981, and The Hershey Company subsequently acquired the Bubble Yum brand in 2000.

== Mascot ==
Bubble Yum's official mascot is Floyd D. Duck, an anthropomorphic punk-style duck character.
