= PÜR Gum =

Canadian chewing gum brand

PUR Gum
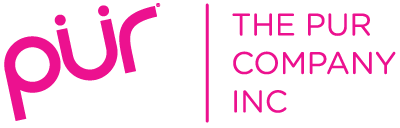
- Industry: Chewing gum, mint (candy), confectionery, health food
- Founded: 2010; 16 years ago
- Founder: Jay Klein
- Headquarters: Toronto, Ontario, Canada
- Number of locations: 50,000 locations in over 50 countries
- Area served: Worldwide
- Products: Aspartame-free chewing gum and breath mints
- Revenue: $250 million+
- Website: thepurcompany.com

PUR Gum is a brand of sugar-free and aspartame-free chewing gum produced by The PUR Company Inc. and founded in 2010 by Jay Klein in Toronto, Ontario, Canada. In recent years, The PUR Company expanded its product line to include mints. PUR products are manufactured in Switzerland, distributed in Canada, and sold in over 50 countries and more than 50,000 distribution points. PUR products are also sold through online outlets such as Amazon. The PUR Company Inc. uses the slogan "Kick Aspartame" to promote their sugar-free and aspartame-free products.

According to 2025 Circana market data, The PUR Company Inc. is the fastest-growing gum brand in the United States among brands with more than 1 million units sold.

== History ==
=== Founding and early growth ===
The PUR Company was founded in 2010 by Jay Klein, an American-born York University graduate who studied Communications and Political Science. Klein sought to develop a chewing gum free of sugar, aspartame, gluten, soy, and nuts. The result was naturally sweetened PUR Gum that contains no additives or chemicals and is non-GMO. Klein decided to sweeten the chewing gum with xylitol so it would be a healthy choice for diabetics, pregnant women, people with dietary sensitivities, and any person seeking to avoid chemicals.

Klein marketed his product first in the Greater Toronto Area by starting small and going door-to door, "running for mayor". The PUR Company then expanded to the rest of Canada and major U.S. metropolitan areas, where “health hubs” – areas with significant markets for health food products – could be found. However, PUR's popularity started to take off after a chain of airport duty-free shops started carrying the product, which helped the brand gain international popularity that spread virally through airports and other channels. The number of international markets grew from three, to six, to ten, and then over 25. Today, PUR products are available in over 50 countries.

=== Dragon's Den appearances ===
In 2014, The PUR Company made an appearance on CBC's Dragon's Den, seeking a $1 million investment in exchange for a 10% equity stake, valuing the company at $10 million. Three Dragons made offers, and Klein accepted a deal on-air Jim Treliving and Arlene Dickinson.

In February 2026, Klein returned to Dragon's Den as a guest Dragon in the 2-part Full Circle special to commemorate the show's 20th season. The special featured five former contestants who returned to invest in a new generation of entrepreneurs.

=== Expansion and recognition ===
In 2016, The PUR Company was ranked the 10th Fastest-Growing Company in Canada and the 4th Fastest-Growing Company in Toronto by Profit 500, with 5-year revenue growth of 5,496%. The PUR Company ranked #10 overall and #1 in the Manufacturing and Distributing Category. PUR continues to expand their operational footprint and distribution across North America. In 2025, PUR was recognized as a category innovator for their Jumbo Sourz chewing gum.

== Products ==
PUR products are formulated without sugar or aspartame and are marketed as vegan, gluten-free, and free from soy and nuts. The products are manufactured in Europe, including facilities in Switzerland, Germany, and Turkey.

The company's products include:

=== Core chewing gum ===
PUR's standard chewing gum line is available in flavours including spearmint, peppermint, bubblegum, cinnamon, wintergreen, coolmint, chocolate mint, and pomegranate mint. Formats include 55 count bags and 9 count blister packs.

=== JUMBO chewing gum ===
PUR introduced a larger-format gum piece, marketed as "JUMBO" available in flavours including bubblegum, grape, watermelon, strawberry, banana, and orange. PUR JUMBO gum is 3x the size of their core chicklets.

=== JUMBO SOURZ gum ===
The company also produces a sour gum line under the "SOURZ" name, available in blue raspberry, watermelon, strawberry, and grape varieties. The product was recognized for the Sweets & Snacks Expo's Most Innovative New Product Awards in 2025.

=== Breath mints ===
PUR breath mints are available in spearmint, peppermint, tangerine tango, cinnamon, and polar mint.

== Adverse effects & accidental pet poisoning ==
The main ingredient in PUR gum is xylitol, which is highly toxic to cats and dogs, "approximately 100 times more toxic than chocolate". It can cause a release of insulin, causing potentially fatal hypoglycemia As PUR gum does not include a prominent warning, veterinarians have warned pet owners should be particularly aware of the hazards if their pets inadvertently get to a pack of PUR gum. According to the FDA and many veterinary sites, accidental pet poisoning is a not-uncommon occurrence. "Over the past several years, the Center for Veterinary Medicine at the U.S. Food and Drug Administration has received several reports—many of which pertained to chewing gum—of dogs being poisoned by xylitol."
