= Beech-Nut =

Baby food company

Beech-Nut Nutrition Corporation
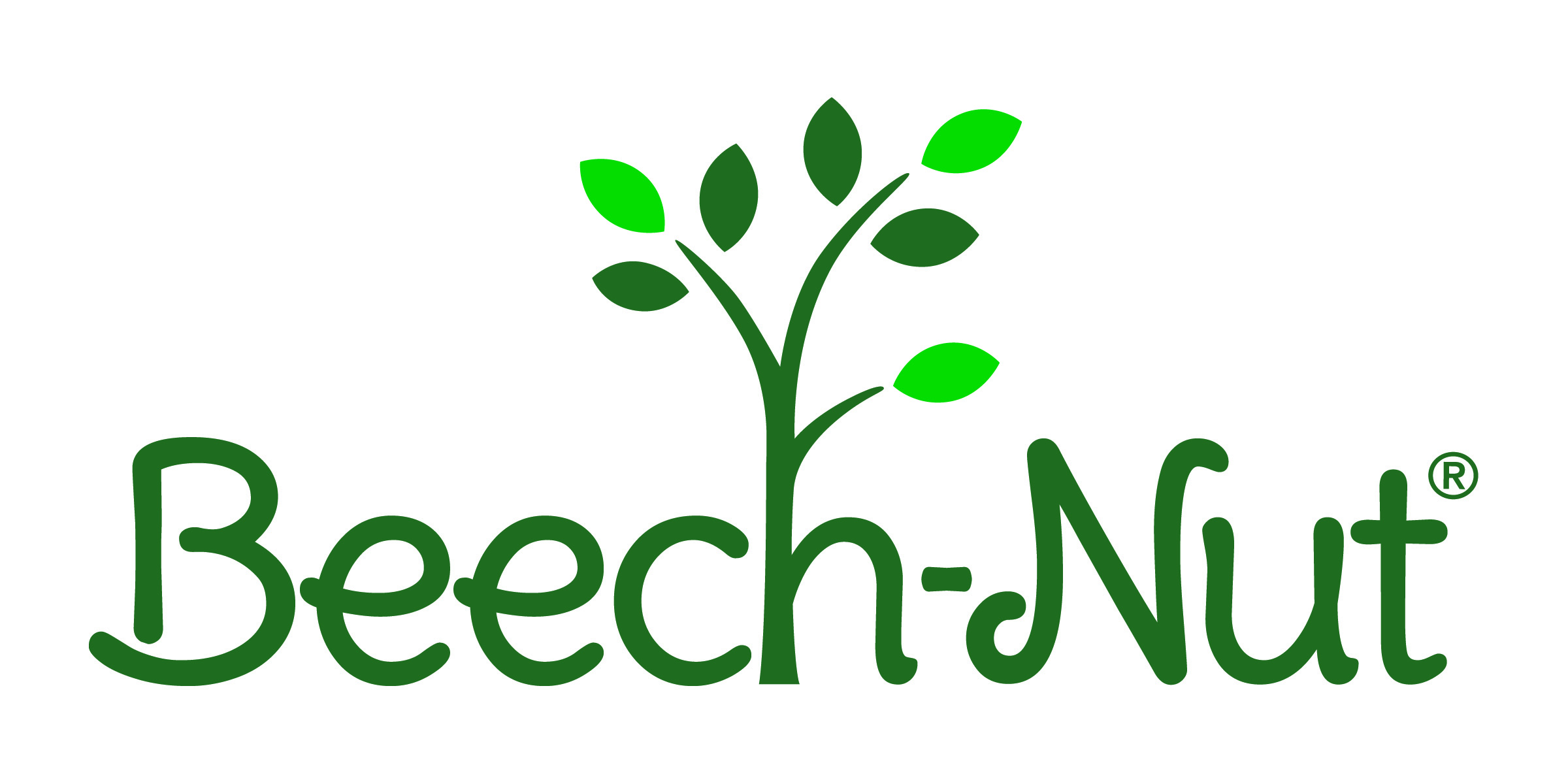
- Industry: Baby food
- Founded: 1891; 135 years ago
- Founder: Raymond P. Lipe, John D. Zieley, Walter H. Lipe and David Zieley
- Headquarters: Amsterdam, New York, United States
- Key people: Sunita Adams
- Products: Cereal, Baby Food Jars, Baby Food Pouches, Toddler Snacks
- Owner: Hero Group
- Website: https://www.beechnut.com/

The Beech-Nut Nutrition Corporation is a baby food company owned by the Swiss branded consumer-goods firm Hero Group.

== History ==
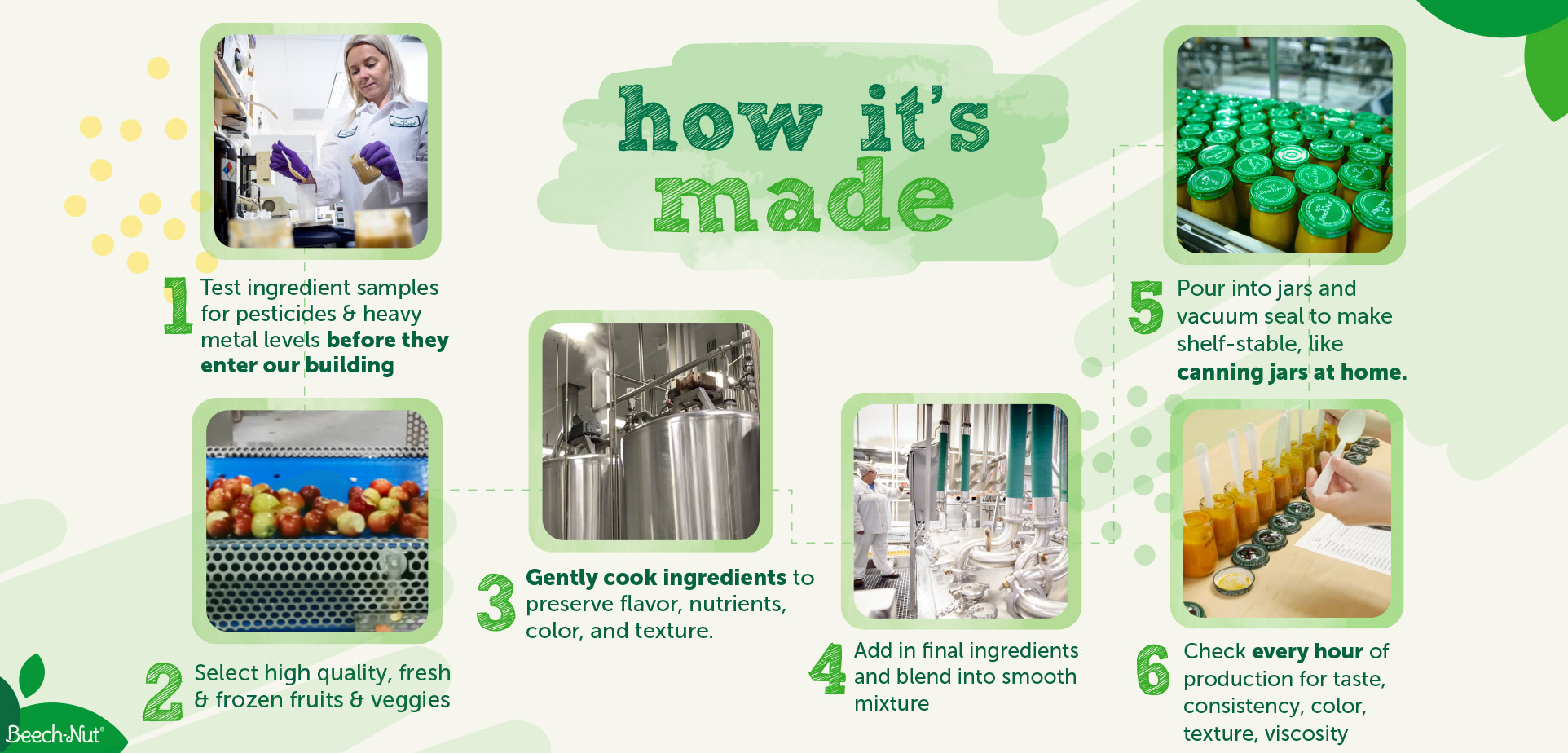
A brief description of Beech-Nut Naturals process

Beech-Nut's roots go back to 1891, to the Mohawk Valley town of Canajoharie, New York. Raymond P. Lipe, along with his friend John D. Zieley and their brothers, Walter H. Lipe and David Zieley, and Bartlett Arkell, founded The Imperial Packing Co. for the production of Beech-Nut ham. The product was based on the smoked hams of the Lipes' father, farmer Ephraim Lipe. The company's principal products were ham and bacon for the first seven years. The Zieleys sold their shares to the Lipe brothers in 1892.

The company was incorporated as the Beech-Nut Packing Company in 1899. Arkell was the first president of the company. In 1900, the company's sales were $200,000. In 1940, Beech-Nut engineers patented a vacuum packing manufacturing process and vacuum jar with a gasket and top that could remain intact in transit and became a standard of the industry.

During the first 25 years of the 20th century, the company expanded its product line into peanut butter, jam, pork and beans, ketchup, chili sauce, mustard, spaghetti, macaroni, marmalade, caramel, fruit drops, mints, chewing gum, and coffee.

== Timeline ==
- 1891: Founded as the Imperial Packing Company.
- 1910: Beech-Nut Chewing Gum line launched by director Frank Barbour
- 1927: Loses a trademark infringement case at the Supreme Court against Lorillard Tobacco Company concerning their Beechnut chewing-tobacco brand.
- 1956: Life Savers Limited merged with Beech-Nut.
- 1968: Beech-Nut Life Savers merged with Squibb (part of the Olin Corporation) to form the Squibb Beech-Nut Corporation.
- 1973: Baby food business was sold to a group led by lawyer Frank C. Nicholas.
- 1976: Beech Nut became the first baby food company to remove added salt, in addition to added refined sugar, beginning the "natural" baby food movement.
- 1979: Nicholas sold the baby food company to Nestlé.
- 1981: Nabisco acquired Life Savers (which includes the Beech-Nut candy line) from the E.R. Squibb Corporation.
- 1982: Beech-Nut introduced the concept of "baby food stages"
- 1985: Beech-Nut began testing its jarred products' ingredients for environmental contaminants, such as heavy metals and pesticides.
- 1987: Beech-Nut Nutrition Corporation paid US$ 2.2 million, then the largest fine issued, for violating the Federal Food, Drug, and Cosmetic Act by selling artificially flavored sugar water as apple juice. John F. Lavery, the company's vice president for operations was convicted in criminal court and sentenced to a year and a day in jail; Niels L. Hoyvald, the president of the company, also convicted, served six months of community service. Each of them also paid a $100,000 fine.
- 1989: Ralston Purina acquired Beech-Nut from Nestlé.
- 1991: Beech-Nut launched its first organic baby food line, Special Harvest.
- 1998: Milnot Holding Corporation, one of the portfolio of companies owned by the private equity investment firm Madison Dearborn Partners, acquired Beech-Nut from Ralcorp (a spin-off of Ralston Purina). A potential merger with H.J. Heinz Co. was successfully challenged by the Federal Trade Commission and never consummated.
- 2002: Beech-Nut becomes the first baby food manufacturer to produce a line of baby food with DHA and ARA, two essential fatty acids found naturally in breast milk.
- 2005: Madison Dearborn sold Milnot, and Beech-Nut along with it, to the Swiss branded consumer-goods firm Hero Group.
- 2007: Beech-Nut announced its intentions to move all of its manufacturing and corporate operations to the town of Florida, New York, a town close to Amsterdam, NY.
- 2009: Beech-Nut introduced the first baby jars with seafood.
- 2013: Beech-Nut collaborated with Goya to introduce Latin-inspired baby food flavors.
- 2014: Beech-Nut launched Beech-Nut Naturals Jars helping to better preserve ingredients' nutrients, flavor, color, and taste.
- 2015: Beech-Nut recalled a batch of Stage 2 Beech-Nut Classics sweet potato & chicken baby food after a small glass piece was found in a jar.
- 2015: Beech-Nut Organics jars were named "Product of the Year," as voted by 40,000 consumers worldwide in a survey by TNS.
- 2021: Voluntarily recalled one lot of Beech-Nut single grain rice cereal and decided to exit the rice cereal segment, entirely.
- 2023 & 2024: Beech-Nut was voted "Best Baby Food Brand" by What to Expect Community
- 2024: Beech-Nut's 20 top-selling single items were certified by The Clean Label Project.
- 2025: In May, the Kosher certification of Beech-Nut was discontinued.
- 2025: Beech-Nut's Stage 1 Organic Jar Variety Pack was voted "Favorite Baby Food" by theSkimm's Moms Who Get It Awards.
