= Dweeb =

A dweeb is a boring, studious, or socially inept person. It may also refer to:

- Dweeb, a character in the 1995 video game The Outfoxies
- Dweeb, a dinosaur in the 1993 animated film We're Back! A Dinosaur's Story
- Dweebs (candy), a discontinued soft and chewy candy
- Dweebs (TV series), a 1995 American sitcom
- Professor Dweeb, a character in the animated TV series The Real Ghostbusters

== See also ==
- Weeb (disambiguation)
