= Candy corn =

Small pyramid-shaped candy

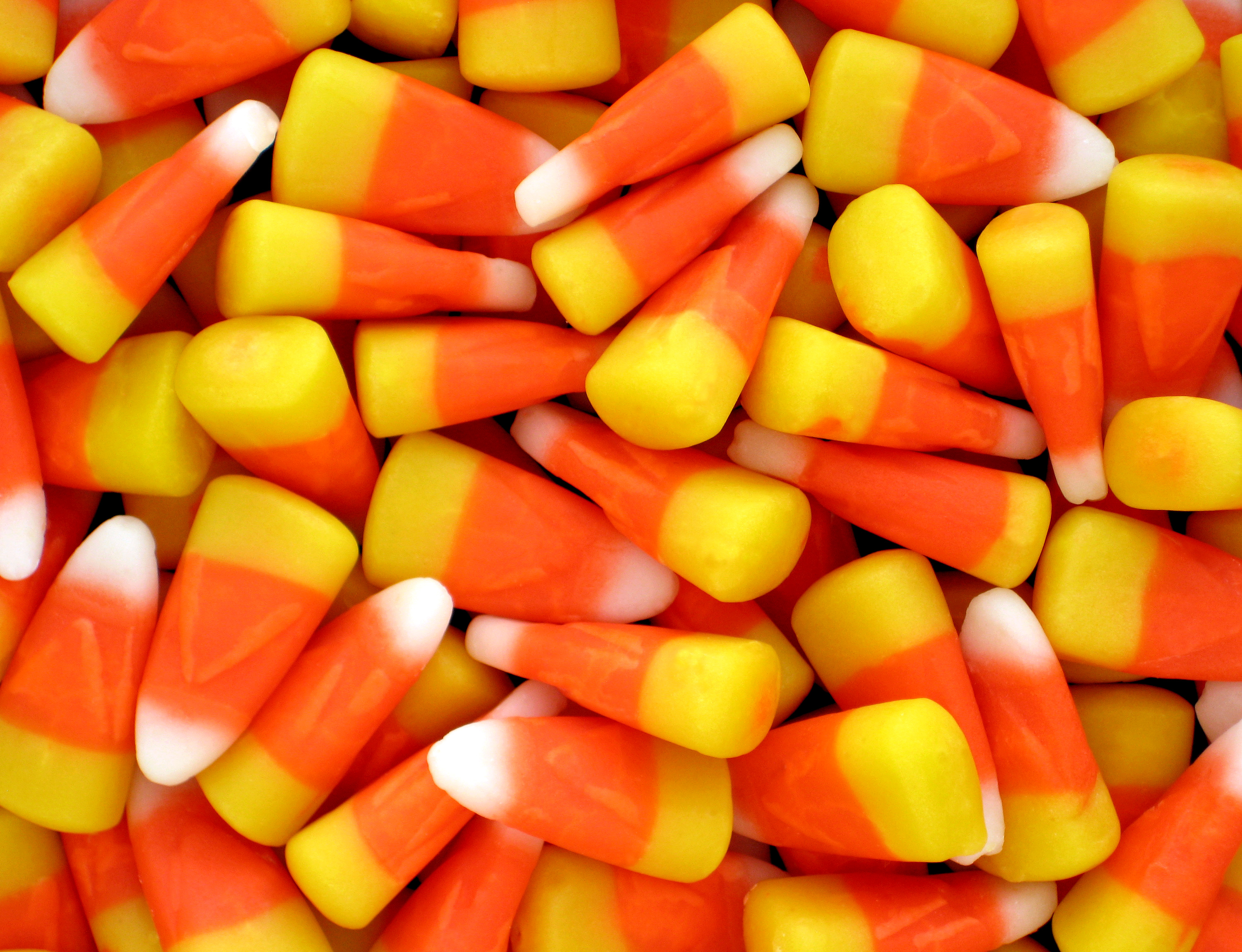
- Alternative names: Chicken Feed
- Type: Confectionery
- Place of origin: United States
- Region or state: Philadelphia, Pennsylvania
- Main ingredients: Sugar, corn syrup, carnauba wax, artificial coloring and binders
- Variations: cupid corn, bunny corn, harvest corn, reindeer corn

Candy corn is a candy typically divided into three sections of different colors. It is a staple candy of the fall season and Halloween in North America.

== History ==
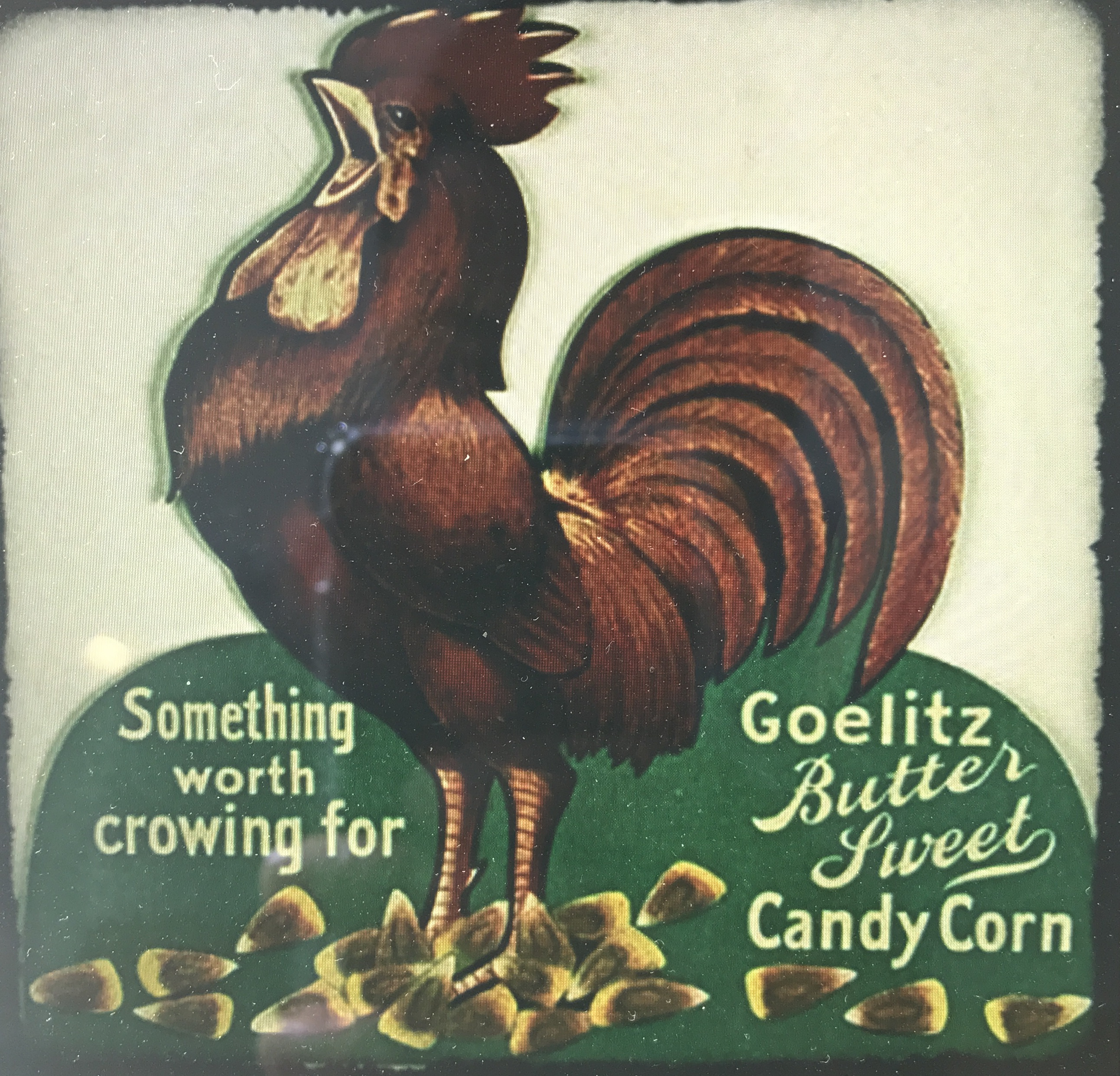
An early advertisement for Goelitz candy corn

"Chicken Feed" was the original candy name, with production starting in the late 1880s. It was first invented in the 1880s by George Renninger, a Wunderle Candy Company employee, in Philadelphia. Wunderle Candy Company was the first to produce the candy in 1888. The Goelitz Confectionery Company, now called Jelly Belly, began manufacturing the product in 1898.

While Jelly Belly still makes candy corn, the largest manufacturer of candy corn is Brach's Confections owned by the Ferrara Candy Company. Brach's makes approximately 7 billion pieces of candy corn per year and possesses 85 percent of the total share of the candy corn industry during the Halloween season.

Along with other agriculture-inspired treats in the late 19th century, America's confectioners sought to market candy corn to a largely rural society. During the late 19th century, "butter cream" candies molded into many types of nature-inspired shapes, including chestnuts, turnips, and clover leaves, were quite popular but what made candy corn stand out was its bright and iconic tri-color layering.

Although it is currently most popular in the fall, candy corn was only sometimes associated with the fall and Halloween seasons. For the first half of the 20th century, candy corn was a well-known "penny candy" or bulk confectionery. It was advertised as an affordable and popular treat that could be eaten year-round.

Candy corn developed into a fall and Halloween staple around the 1950s when people began to hand out individually wrapped candy to trick-or-treaters. The harvest-themed colors and increased advertising in October also helped candy corn become a fall staple. Candy corn's traditional colors of yellow, orange, and white represent the colors of the fall harvest, or of corn on the cob, with the wide yellow end resembling a corn kernel.

The National Confectioners Association has deemed October 30, the day before Halloween, "National Candy Corn Day".

== Reputation ==
Candy corn has a reputation for generating polarizing responses, with articles referring to it as "Halloween's most contentious sweet" which people either "love" or "hate".

== Sales ==
As of 2016, annual production in the United States was 35 million pounds, or almost 9 billion pieces of candy. The majority of candy corn sales occur during the Halloween season.

== Production ==
Originally, the candy was made by hand. Manufacturers first combined sugar, corn syrup and water, and cooked them to form a slurry. Fondant was added for texture and marshmallows were added to provide a soft bite.

The recipe is similar today. The production method, called "corn starch modeling", likewise remains the same, though tasks initially performed by hand were soon taken over by machines made for that purpose.

== Ingredients ==
Candy corn is made with sugar, corn syrup, salt, sesame oil, honey, artificial flavor, food colorings, gelatin, and confectioner's glaze. The confectioner's glaze is made from lac resin, a bug secretion. Candy corn has a waxy texture and a flavor based on honey, sugar, and vanilla.

== Variants ==
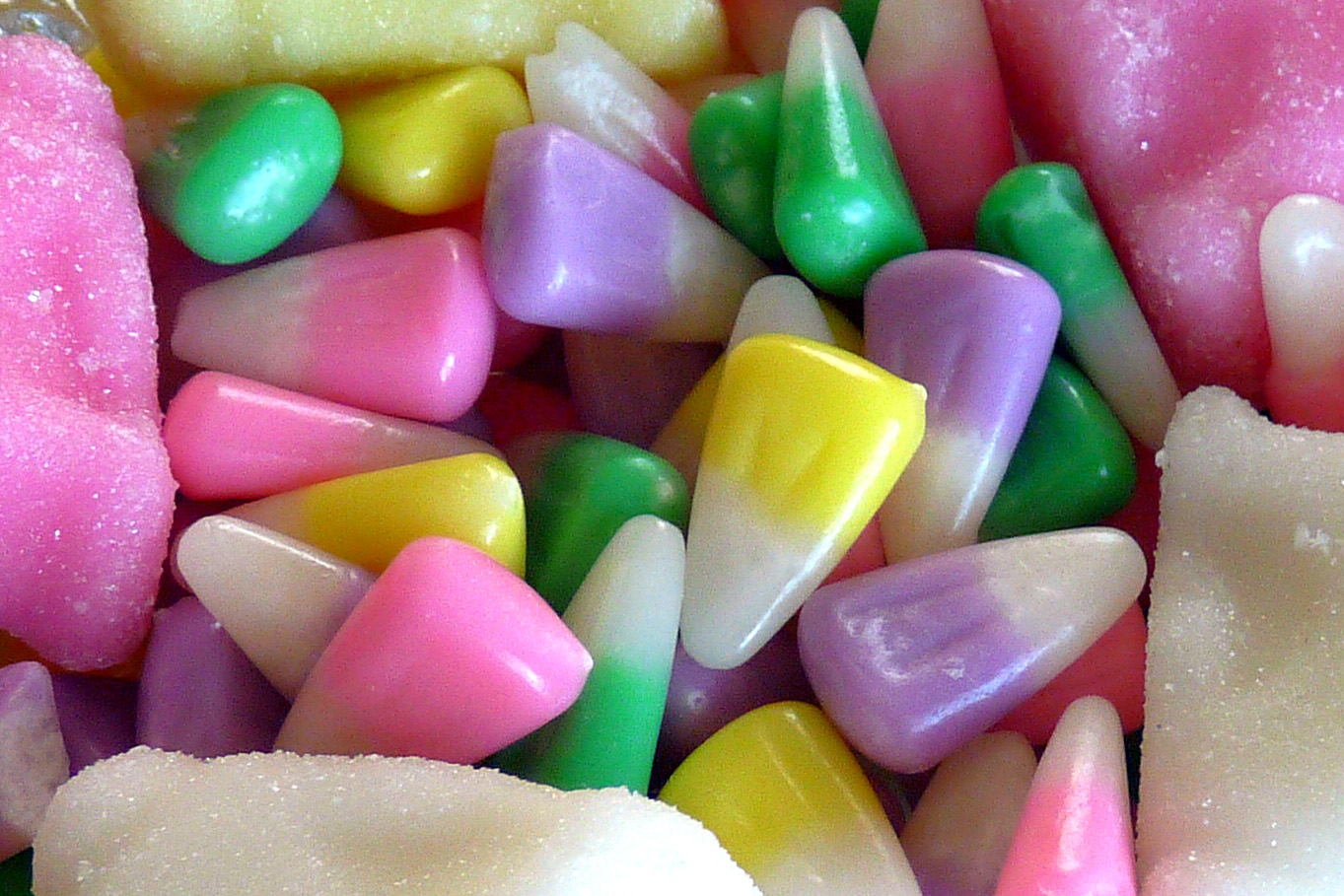
Easter candy corn

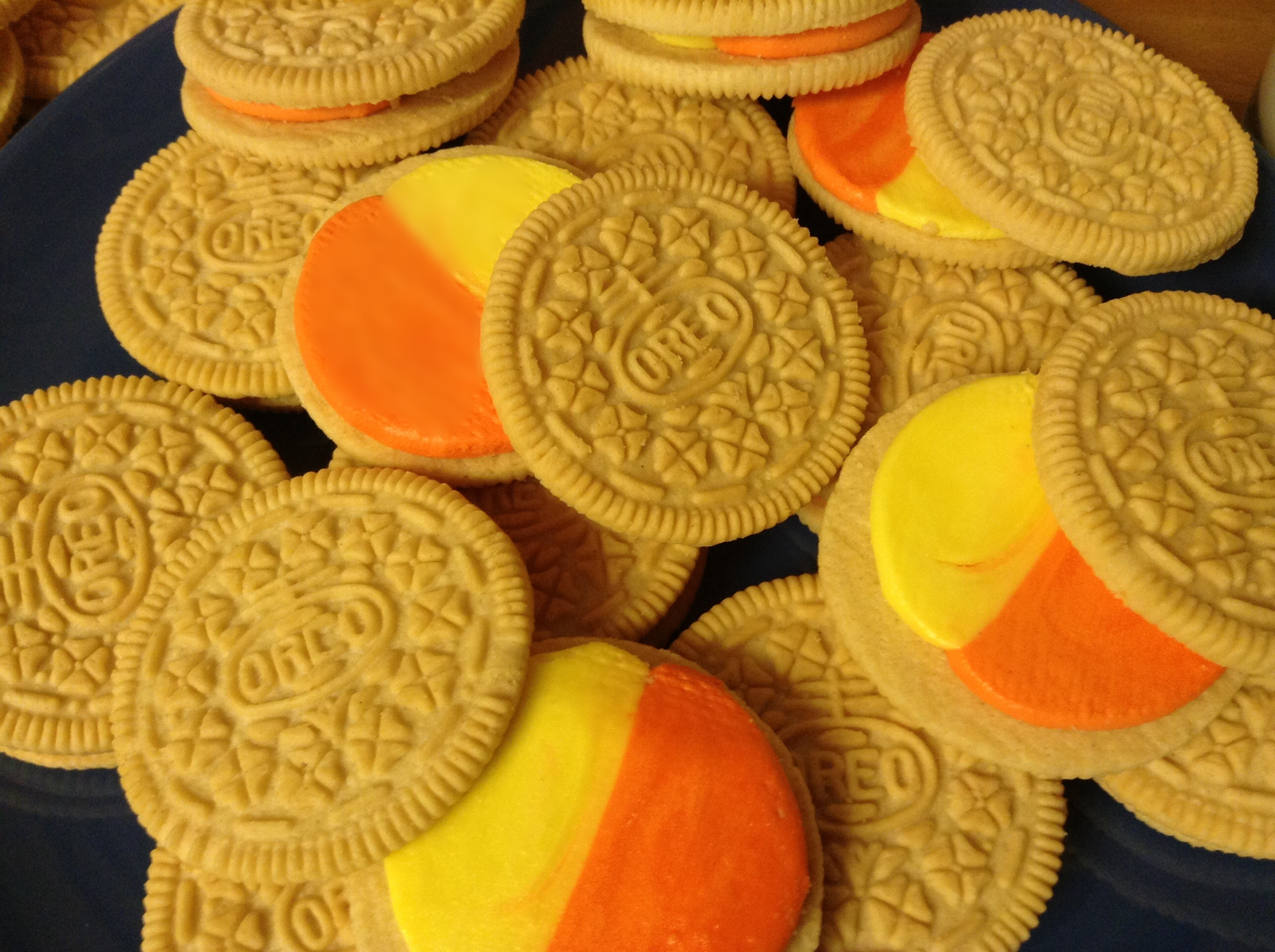
Candy Corn–flavored Oreos

A popular variation called "harvest corn" adds cocoa powder; it features a chocolate brown wide end, orange center, and pointed white tip. It is often available around Thanksgiving. During the Halloween season, blackberry cobbler candy corn can be found in Eastern Canada, as well as candy corn shaped like pumpkins. Confectioners have introduced additional color variations suited to other holidays.

The Christmas variant, sometimes called "reindeer corn", typically has a red end and a green center. The Valentine's Day variant, sometimes called "cupid corn", typically has a red end and a pink center. In the United States during Independence Day celebrations, corn with a blue end, white center, and red tip, named "freedom corn", can be found at celebratory cookouts and patriotic celebrations. The Easter variant, sometimes called "bunny corn", is typically a two-color candy, and comes with a variety of pastel bases, pink, green, yellow, and purple, with white tips all in one package.

There have been caramel apple and green apple, s'mores and pumpkin spice, carrot corn (green and orange, with a carrot cake flavor), and birthday cake candy corn flavors. In 2022, Brach's released a tailgate variant with fruit punch, vanilla ice cream, popcorn, hotdog, and hamburger flavored pieces. Candy corn flavored snacks have become more widely available with candy corn flavored variants of snack foods and candy, including Oreos, M&M's, marshmallows, and more.

== See also ==
- Candy pumpkin
- Fruitcake
