= Ferrara Candy Company =

American candy manufacturer

- Type: Subsidiary
- Industry: Confectionery
- Founded: 1908; 118 years ago
- Headquarters: Old Post Office Chicago, Illinois, U.S.
- Area served: Worldwide
- Brands: 100 Grand • Atomic Fireball • Baby Ruth • Black Forest • Bobs Candies • Bottle Caps • Brach's • Butterfinger • Chuckles • Chunky • Crunch • Dori • Everlasting Gobstopper • Fruit Stripe • Fun Dip • Funables • Goobers • Heide Candy Company • Jaw Busters • Jelly Belly • Jujyfruits • Keebler • Laffy Taffy • Lemonhead • Nerds • Nips • Now and Later • Oh Henry! • Boston Baked Beans • Pixy Stix • Rain-Blo • Raisinets • Red Hots • Runts • Sathers • Sno-Caps • Spree (candy) • Stretch Island • Super Bubble • SweeTarts • Trolli USA • Trolli
- Parent: Ferrero
- Website: www.ferrarausa.com

The Ferrara Candy Company or "Ferrara Group" is an American multi-national candy manufacturer, based in downtown Chicago, Illinois.

The company was formed from a 2012 merger of the Forest Park, Illinois-based Ferrara Pan Candy Company and Minnesota-based Farley's & Sathers Candy Company. Ferrara's product line includes the brands of Ferrara-branded pan candy (such as Lemonheads, Atomic Fireballs, Red Hots, and Original Boston Baked Beans) and those of Farley's & Sathers (such as Brach's, Chuckles, Jujyfruits, and Now and Later). In November 2017, The Ferrero Group announced that they were going to acquire the company, which was finalized in December 2017.

In 2018, Ferrara's parent company Ferrero SpA purchased Nestlé's U.S. candy line for $2.8 billion and handed responsibility for most products to Ferrara. Former Nestlé products now distributed in the U.S. by Ferrara include Butterfinger, Crunch, Baby Ruth, Raisinets, Nips, Laffy Taffy, and hard candy (such as Spree and Everlasting Gobstopper) formerly produced by Nestlé under the Willy Wonka brand. Two exceptions are Nestlé's Kit Kat and Rolo lines, which are licensed to the Hershey Company.

Ferrara announced it was moving its world headquarters to Chicago in 2019.

== History ==
Salvatore Ferrara emigrated from Nola to New York in 1900. In 1908, he opened a bakery at 772 W. Taylor with his brother-in-law, Salvatore "Sal" Lezza, in the heart of Chicago's "Little Italy" neighborhood. He sold candy-coated almonds known as "confetti" (or Jordan almonds), a popular treat at Italian weddings. Sal Lezza learned to pan candy in Italy and taught his brother-in-law the trade. At the time, however, wedding cakes were the big profit maker and the relatives split the business into two, one with the bakery, led by Lezza; and, one for the candy, led by Ferrara.

Ferrara partnered with two brothers-in-law, Salvatore Buffardi and Anello Pagano. They built a two-story brick building at 2200 W. Taylor and began producing a variety of panned candies. The second floor of the building was devoted to the revolving kettles that produced the pan candy, with all of the machines being driven by a giant wheel. The candy was dropped to the shipping department below through a hole in the floor.

The private equity firm Catterton Partners, owner of Farley's & Sathers Candy Company, arranged the 2012 deal whereby that well-established confectioner would merge with the Ferrara Pan Candy Company. Although Ferrara Pan Candy was only about half the size of Farley's & Sathers, the new company was christened the Ferrara Candy Company and placed under the leadership of Ferrara Pan Chief Executive Salvatore Ferrara II.

Ferrara Candy is headquartered in Chicago, Illinois. It operates seven manufacturing plants in the U.S. and Mexico, as well as distribution centers around the United States.

The company sells 92% of all mellowcremes in the U.S.; it is the largest producer of candy canes, the largest seller of conversation hearts and produces a large portion of the jelly beans that are consumed in the United States. The company has 21 starch moguls, of 40 in the U.S. as a whole. The company has between 700 and 800 pans operating at any given time. It states that it produces 1 million pounds of gummy candy per week in four manufacturing plants, two in the U.S. and two in Mexico. The company employs approximately 6,000 people.

== Timeline ==
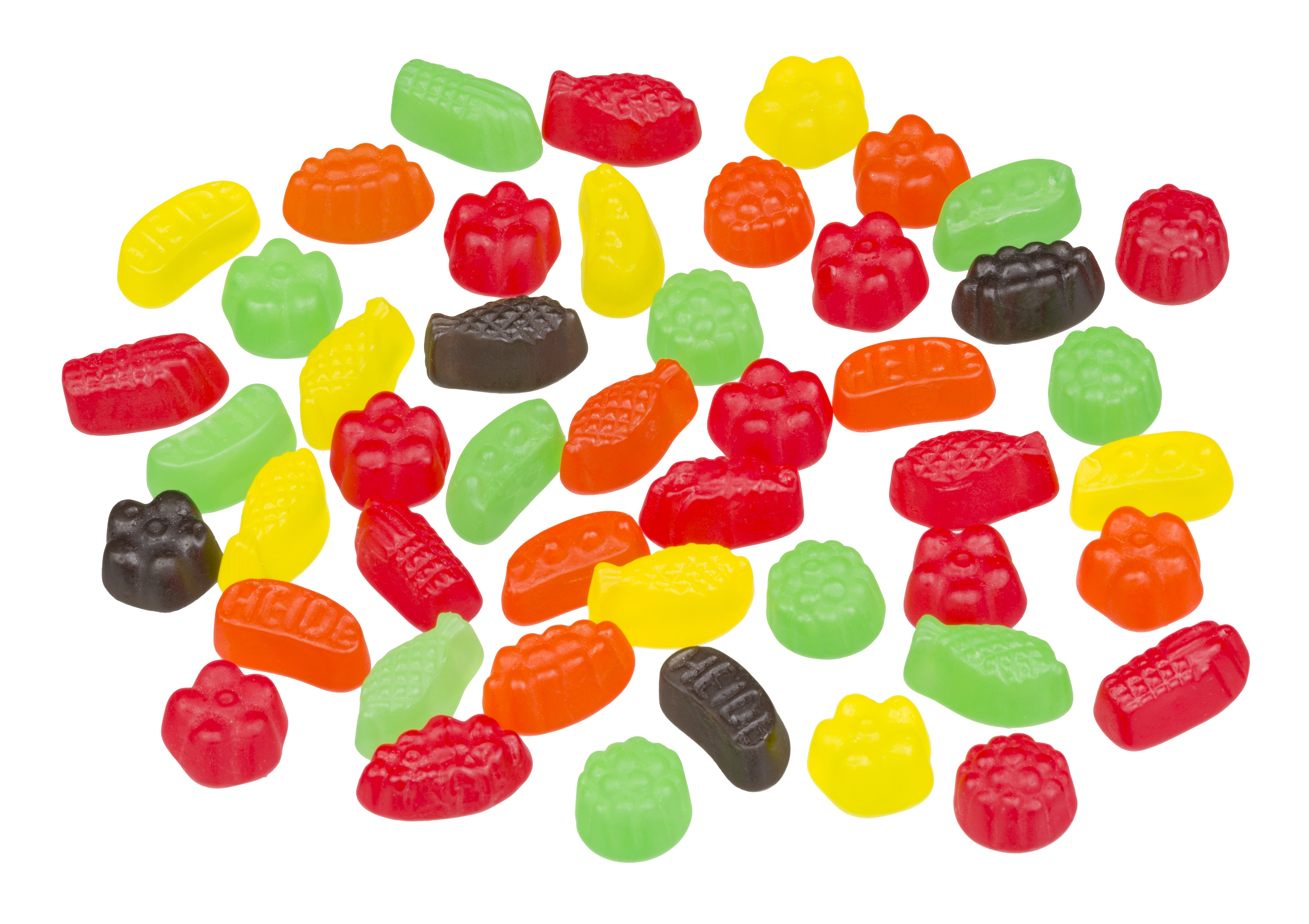
Jujyfruits

- 1860s: Henry Heide Candy Company begins business.
- 1890s: Farley Candy Company established.
- 1904: Brach's Candies begins production in the backroom of a Chicago store. Brock's Candy of Chattanooga begins production of penny candies, peanut brittle and jelly candies.
- 1908: Ferrara Pan Candy is formed.
- 1919: Bobs Candies is formed.
- 1921: Baby Ruth is introduced.
- 1930s: Sathers Candy Company begins operations.
- 1962: Lemonheads introduced.
- 1980s: Trolli Gummis begins production in the U.S.
- 1994: Brach's Candy purchases a controlling interest in Brock's Candy of Chattanooga.
- 1995: Favorite Brands International created with purchase of Kraft Caramel, Marshmallow, Dinner Mints and Peanut Brittle businesses. Henry Heide, Inc is sold to Hershey Foods.
- 1996: Favorite Brands International acquires Farley Foods, Sathers Candy and Kidd Marshmallow businesses.
- 1997: Favorite Brands International acquires Dae Julie and the Trolli Gummi businesses.
- 2002: Catterton Partners form Farleys & Sathers Candy Company made up of assets from the former Farley Foods, Sathers Candy Company, and the Kraft Taffy business from Kraft; Chuckles and several other Henry Heide brands purchased from Hershey Foods.
- 2005: Farley & Sathers acquires the Trolli Gummi business, which had been part of the Favorite Brands group of products, from Wm. Wrigley Jr. Company, which had acquired it as part of a larger group of businesses from Kraft. Bob's Candies is acquired.
- 2007: Farley & Sathers acquires Brach's Candy.
- 2012: Catterton Partners merges Farley & Sathers with Ferrara Pan Candy Company under the combined company name Ferrara Candy Company, Inc.
- 2017: Ferrero Group acquires Ferrara Candy Company.
- 2018: Ferrero buys Nestlé's U.S. candy business with its Ferrara unit taking over Nestlé's U.S. candy brands.
- 2023: Ferrara Candy Company acquires Dori Alimentos.
- 2023: Ferrara Candy Company acquires Jelly Belly Candy Company.
- 2024: Ferrara discontinues Fruit Stripe gum.
- 2025: Ferrara Candy Company acquires Carambar & Co (Carambar & Co is made up of assets formerly owned by Kraft (now Mondelez)).

== Products ==
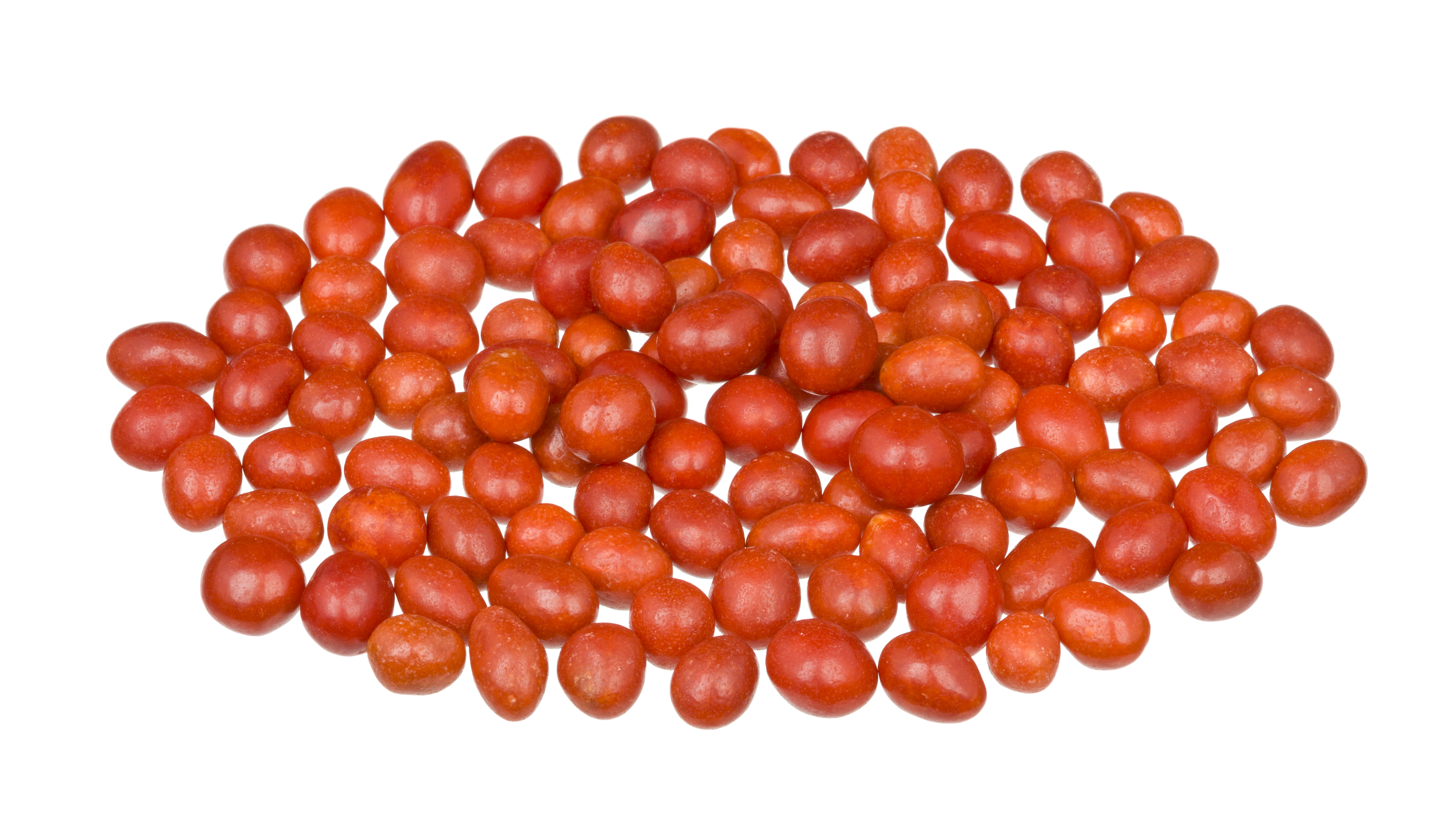
Boston Baked Beans (candy-coated peanuts)

- Atomic Fireball: A round, cinnamon-flavored hard candy invented by Nello Ferrara (1918–2012) in 1954. They are a form of jawbreaker. The outer layers of the candy are a bright red color, while the interior layers are white. Atomic Fireballs have been adopted by Flight Controllers in NASA's Mission Control as the "Console Candy of Choice". Dr. McGillicuddy's Fireball Cinnamon Whisky, a Canadian whisky liqueur debuted in the mid-1980s by Canadian distiller Seagram, which is now manufactured by the American Sazerac Company is based on the flavoring.
- Black Forest: A brand of fruit juice snacks and treats in various shapes; Gummy Bears, Gummy Worms and other varieties.
- Bobs Candies: Soft mints and sticks, candy canes and mint "lumps".
- Boston Baked Beans: A sugar-coated peanut candy.
- Brach's: A candy and sweets brand that produces and has invented many iconic candies, including candy corn, Conversation Hearts, Jelly Bird Eggs, Star Brite Mints, Royals, Bridge Mix, malted milk balls, Double Dipped Peanuts and others.
- Chuckles: A soft jelly candy, covered in sugar in five original colors (red, orange, yellow, green and black). They are now made in a number of varieties and seasonal selections.
- Fruit Stripe: A fruit-flavored chewing gum created in the 1960s. Also comes in a bubble gum variety.
- Jaw Busters: The original 1919 jawbreaker. As they dissolve, they change color and flavor with each of the five layers.
- Jelly Belly: gourmet jelly beans.
- Jujyfruits: Small, chewy, fruit flavored candies that come in various fruit shapes and flavors such as raspberry, orange, lemon, lime, and anise. Also available are Jujubes, which are a firmer candy dating back to 1920 in the traditional flavors of lemon, lime, violet, cherry and lilac.
- Laffy Taffy: Rectangular taffy named for the jokes which are included on each wrapper. Flavors include banana, strawberry, sour apple, cherry and grape. Tangy Taffy, a similar product, was previously purchased by Nestle and is now marketed under the Laffy Taffy brand.
- Lemonhead: Introduced in 1962, Lemonheads are a round, lemon-flavored candy consisting of a sweet coating, soft sour shell, and a hard candy core. Other varieties include Appleheads, Grapeheads and Chewy Lemonheads & Friends varieties.
- Nerds: Introduced in 1983, Nerds are a little pebble-like candy with a crunch, usually contain two flavors per box, and each flavor has a separate compartment and opening. Larger packages may contain various colors—sometimes referred to as Rainbow Nerds. The brand is also responsible for Nerds Gummy Clusters, which were launched in 2020 and as of October 2024 accounted for over $500 million of sales for the brand.
- Now and Later: Bite-sized squares of taffy in 19 different fruit flavors. They come in Original, Chewy and Splits varieties and are packaged in both multi-pieced bars and assorted jars.
- Rain-Blo: Bubble gumballs where the color on the outside matches the flavor on the inside.
- Red Hots: A small cinnamon-flavored candy, usually spicy, created and trademarked by the Ferrara Pan Candy Company in the 1930s.
- Super Bubble: Individually-wrapped bubble gum first introduced in 1946 in original, grape, apple and watermelon flavors.
- Trolli (U.S.): Gummy candies that are both sour and sweet in unusual shapes.
