= Punky =

Punky may refer to:

- Punky can be used as a nickname for Penelope (given name)
- Punky (TV series), an Irish animated television series
- Punky Brewster, an American sitcom television series
- Punky Brüster – Cooked on Phonics, the debut studio album by Canadian musician Devin Townsend
- Punky Skunk, a 1996 side-scrolling action-platform video game
- Punky Meadows (born 1950), American guitarist and member of the band Angel
- Punky, a colloquial name for the biting midges family Ceratopogonidae
- Punki, a character from Pingu.

== See also ==
- Punky's, a type of candy
- Punkie (disambiguation)
