= Wonka Biscuits =

Brand of chocolate coated biscuits

Wonka Biscuits were a type of chocolate-coated biscuit manufactured by Nestlé under The Willy Wonka Candy Company brand in the UK. They were only available during mid-2002.

They came in two varieties: a Golden Cruncher Biscuit (similar to McVities Gold, but with a crunchier coating), and an Xploder Biscuit (which contained popping candy like the regular Xploder bars).

Nestle sold the Wonka confectionery brand to the Ferrero Group in March 2018.
