= Candy pumpkin =

Pumpkin-shaped creme confection

Candy Pumpkin
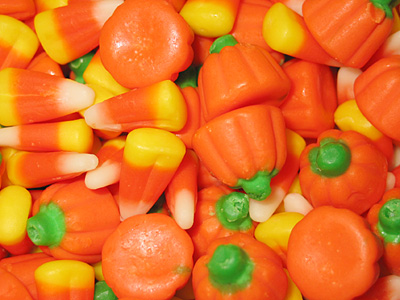
- Candy corn and candy pumpkins
- Type: Confectionery
- Place of origin: United States
- Main ingredients: Corn syrup, honey, carnauba wax, sugar

A candy pumpkin is a small, pumpkin-shaped, mellow crème candy primarily made from corn syrup, honey, carnauba wax, chocolate, and sugar. Traditionally colored with an orange base and topped with a green stem to make candy pumpkins largely identifiable with Halloween, a candy pumpkin is considered a mellow crème by confectioners since the candy has a marshmallow flavor. Sometimes called candy corn's first cousin, candy pumpkins are made through a starch casting process similar to that for candy corn. Brach's candy pumpkin, known by the trademarked name "Mellowcreme" Pumpkins, is the most-sold candy pumpkin. Brach's Confections is now owned by Ferrara Candy Company.

== Production ==
To make candy pumpkins, corn syrup, food coloring, honey, and sugar are beaten and heated in large kettles to produce an ultra-sweet syrup. This syrupy mix generically is called "mellow crème" by confectioners, since the resulting candy has a mellow, creamy texture. The mellow crème slurry then was divided into two uneven amounts, with the large amount receiving orange food coloring and the smaller receiving green food coloring. A mogul machine brings the two colored mixtures together into a mold made of cornstarch, and the assembly is sent to a separate drying room to dry for 24 to 36 hours. Once dry, the candy is shaken to remove excess cornstarch and a final glaze is added to give the candy pumpkin a sheen. Candy pumpkins, acorns and other shapes that are derived from the mellow crème mixture are often sold with candy corn under the name "harvest mix."

== History ==
Candy pumpkins are made using a similar process to make candy corn. The candy corn process and product were created by George Renninger of the Wunderlee Candy Co. in the 1880s and became popular as a treat in the 1920s.

As of 1988, Brach's Confections was one of the largest confectionary companies to produce candy pumpkins. In 1992, Brach's Confections expected to sell more than 30 million pounds of mellow crème candy during the fall season, which included its seasonal mellow crème pumpkins.

By 1997, candy pumpkins and other mellow crème candies helped push annual spending on Halloween candy in the United States to an estimated $950 million a year. In response to the success of Brach's Confections, Mars, Inc. came out with Snickers Crème Pumpkin in 1998. The milk chocolate-covered peanut and caramel candy was packaged in plastic wrappers featuring a jack-o-lantern on the package. Two years later, in 2000, Frankford Candy & Chocolate Company cross-licensed with ConAgra Foods to produce Peter Pan Peanut Butter Pumpkins. Peter Pan Peanut Butter Pumpkins included a Peter Pan peanut butter center pressed into a pumpkin mold. Also in 2000, Zachary Confections expanded its product line to include candy pumpkins.

== Cultural impact ==
In addition to becoming popular in the United States as a Halloween confectionery, candy pumpkins played a role in the current U.S. implementation of daylight saving time. Since the 1960s, candy makers had wanted to get the trick-or-treat period covered by Daylight Saving, reasoning that if children have an extra hour of daylight, they would collect more candy. During the 1985 U.S. Congressional hearings on Daylight Saving, the industry put candy pumpkins on the seat of every senator, hoping to win favor. On July 8, 1986, President Ronald Reagan signed the Federal Fire Prevention and Control Act of 1986 into law; it contained a daylight saving rider which continued daylight saving time until the early morning of last Sunday in October; this did not include Halloween night, however. Daylight savings time did not cover Halloween until 2005, when daylight saving time was extended to the first Sunday in November.

== See also ==
- Candy corn
