= Applehead =

Applehead may refer to

- Applehead (candy), an American brand of candy, produced by the Ferrara Candy Company
- Applehead (cat), a type of Siamese cat
- Applehead (dog), a type of Chihuahua dog
- Michael Jackson's nickname
