= Andy Cowan =

American writer and script consultant

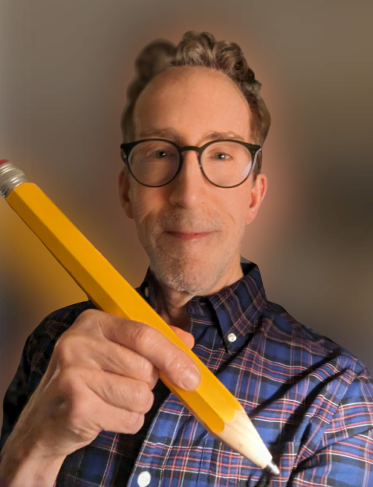
Andy Cowan

Andy Cowan (born Andrew Glenn Cowan) is an American writer and script consultant for television and other media and a podcast host. He is the creator and host of the comedy/therapy podcast, The Neurotic Vaccine, launched in 2022, rebranded in 2026 as The Neurotic Vaccine: Comedy with a Point. In 2026, it was named a Signal Awards Bronze winner in the Shows division for their new Solopreneur category. It was also a 2026 Quill (podcasting) Awards finalist for Podcast of the Year, and 2025 winner for Best Comedy. In 2023 it was a multiple final Quill Podcast Award nominee for Best New Podcast and Best Comedy Podcast. The Neurotic Vaccine wound up landing among the top comedy podcast charts in the U.S., Canada, Mexico, Italy, Greece, Denmark, New Zealand, Ghana and the Philippines, and among the top general/education/mental health charts in Australia, Sweden, Ireland, United Arab Emirates, South Africa, Nigeria, Malaysia, Belgium and the United Kingdom. From 2010–2011, Cowan co-hosted an early incarnation, the radio comedy/therapy talk show, Up & Down Guys, on KPFK 90.7 FM in Los Angeles. In 2019 an Up & Down Guys podcast pilot was produced for Westwood One.

He has appeared on several television shows, hosted the hour-long talk show pilot, Another Talk Show! with Andy Cowan, featuring Jason Alexander and Sheila Raye Charles, and was guest commentator on KTTV's Good Day L.A. He has written humor columns for the Los Angeles Times newspaper and magazine, Salon, special material for The New Yorker, and several songs, one of which won international song contest nods. He is a voiceover artist, and performs as lead vocalist and hand percussionist in jazz venues throughout Los Angeles.

== Biography ==
Cowan received a master's degree in broadcasting from Boston University and began his broadcasting career in radio and TV news in Pennsylvania. Featured in the November 2018 edition of American University Magazine, it was there he received his bachelor of arts degree in psychology.

== Career ==
After gaining media experience in Pennsylvania radio and TV stations and performing standup comedy, Cowan moved to Los Angeles, writing scripts for several comedy television shows. He gained greater exposure with The Merv Griffin Show during the 1980s, where he wrote, assisted in producing segments, and was a recurring performer. He pre-interviewed hundreds of political, literary and entertainment figures, including Jerry Seinfeld and Orson Welles eight times up to his final TV appearance, deemed one of TV Guide magazine's 60 greatest talk show moments. For the cable TV channel Showtime, he produced, wrote and hosted the 1990 short 6 Minutes, a spoof of the popular 60 Minutes. That segment won a CableACE Award in 1991.

In 1996 Variety named him one of "50 Creatives to Watch." At the 2009 Southeast New England Film, Music & Arts Festival, Cowan received the Best Comedy Award for the short film, Knocked Down, which he wrote and appears in. He was writing consultant on Prego, best comedy short film at the 2015 Manhattan Film Festival. Cowan has performed in comedy clubs throughout the country. His voice has been used on audiobooks for the Star Wars audiobook series, as narrator on the Audible Inc. audiobook, Tales from the Oklahoma Sooners Sidelines, and in TV show voiceovers, including as narrator on Hollywood's Best Film Directors. He has written for MyFM in Los Angeles and wrote for the Jack FM network from 2007 to 2010. He has written 300 panels for the award-winning worldwide syndicated newspaper comic strip Bizarro, in collaboration with Dan Piraro, one of which was featured on NBC's Meet the Press, over 40 panels for the syndicated newspaper comic strip Rhymes with Orange, in collaboration with Hilary B. Price, multiple panels for Harry Bliss's syndicated comic panel, Bliss, a panel and special material for The New Yorker. With artist Dan McConnell, he's written multiple panels for the British current affairs magazine, Prospect, Reader's Digest Humor in Uniform panels, including for their 2026 Laughter, the Best Medicine collection, Air Mail, a digital weekly magazine launched in 2019 by former Vanity Fair editor-in-chief Graydon Carter and former The New York Times reporter Alessandra Stanley, political cartoon panels for Counterpoint Media, and a cartoon for The New York Times 2026 tribute to P.C. Vey.

Cowan's songwriting work includes ... Hitchin' on the Highway of Life (music, lyrics, vocals by Andy Cowan, guitar arrangement by Marty Rifkin, award-winning session musician for Bruce Springsteen, Tom Petty and Jewel), recipient of five international songwriting nods and featured in Knocked Down and the opening theme of The Neurotic Vaccine ... And 20th Century Man (music, lyrics, vocals), the theme to Another Talk Show! with Andy Cowan and Our Time is Up with Andy Cowan (host, writer, producer).

Cowan's television writing work includes "The Opposite", one of the top ten Seinfeld episodes. In 2026, "The Opposite" was picked second among the top four Seinfeld episodes on The Rushmore Podcast by Larry David, Jerry Seinfeld, and hosts Ari Emanuel and Ben Persky.

In 2016, author/columnist, CNN anchor and SiriusXM radio host, Michael Smerconish, devoted a Sunday column in The Philadelphia Inquirer to Cowan's takes on Donald Trump's opposite approach to running for president, and interviewed Cowan on his SiriusXM show about Trump possibly becoming Cowan's epitaph, for which Cowan, as reported in TV Guide's TV Insider, apologized.

Cowan was a 2017 recipient of a Lifetime Achievement Award from Marquis Who's Who in America, and was doubly acknowledged in 2013 by the Writers Guild of America as a writer on the 101 Best Written TV Series, Cheers, Seinfeld.

His memoir, Banging My Head Against the Wall: A Comedy Writer's Guide to Seeing Stars, with a foreword by Jay Leno, was released on June 28, 2018. Media interviews included KCAL-TV CBS Channel 9; Los Angeles; KTLA-TV Channel 5, Los Angeles; KABC Radio, Los Angeles; WGN Radio, Chicago; The Michael Smerconish Program, SiriusXM; Coast to Coast AM with George Noory; The Michael Harrison Interview and The Adam Carolla Show on PodcastOne; The Jim Bohannon Show; and First Light on Westwood One. Banging My Head Against the Wall: A Comedy Writer's Guide to Seeing Stars is featured at the National Comedy Center in Jamestown, New York.

=== Credits ===
Partial credits include:

- Cheers (3 episodes plus an additional story, 1985–1987) – (writer)
- Throb (1 episode, 1986) – (writer)
- Take Five aka The George Segal Show, (6 episodes, 1987) – (writer, story editor)
- The Pat Sajak Show (1989-1990) – (writer, performer)
- Into the Night (1990–1991) – (writer)
- Seinfeld (23 episodes, 1994–1995) – (writer, program consultant)
- Double Rush (12 episodes, 1994) – (writer, story editor)
- 3rd Rock from the Sun (16 episodes, 1995–96) – (writer, executive story consultant)
- The Merv Griffin Show 1981–86) – writer, segment producer, talent coordinator, performer)
- 6 Minutes (Showtime, 1990 short segment) – (producer, writer, host)
- My Talk Show (1990, 1991) – (writer)
- The Best Damn Sports Show Period (3 episodes, 2002) – (announcer)
- Only Human (1990) (CBS pilot, co-writer)
- Barely Fitz (1998) (CBS pilot, writer)
- Howie (2000) (Fox pilot, writer)
- Knocked Down (2008 short film) – (writer, actor, vocalist)
- Ellen DeGeneres - (writer for 2001 Emmy hosting)
- Phonees (2011 webisode series) – (writer, actor)
- Up & Down Guys (2010–11 radio show, KPFK-FM, Los Angeles) – (creator, writer, co-host)
- Another Talk Show! with Andy Cowan (2011 pilot) – (executive producer, writer, host)
- Our Time is Up with Andy Cowan (2015 pilot) – (creator, writer, host)
- Wannabes (2016 pilot) – (Co-creator, writer, actor)
- Donald Trump is George as "The Opposite", The Michael Smerconish Program interview, SiriusXM, March 2016
- Is That Normal? with Andy Cowan (2019 comedy docuseries pilot) – (co-creator, executive producer, lead)
- Die Job (2019 dark comedy feature) – (writer)
- The Neurotic Vaccine: Comedy with a Point (2022-- comedy/therapy podcast) - (creator, writer, producer, editor, host, Spotify For Creators)
