= Now and Later =

American brand of candy

Now and Later packaging

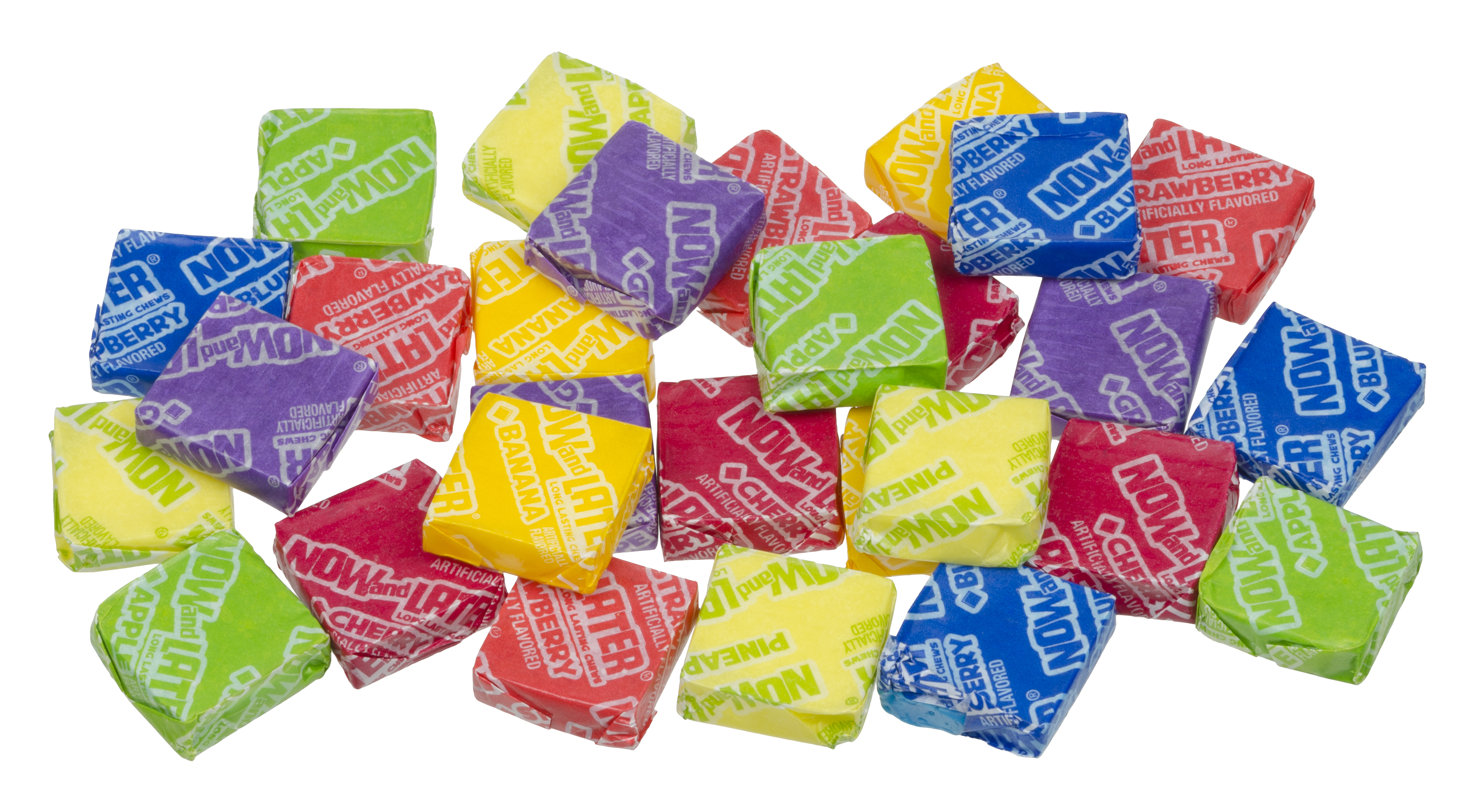
Loose Now and Laters

Now and Later is an American brand of fruit-flavored taffy-like candy manufactured by Ferrara Candy Company. The candy is formed into squares and packaged in colorful paper. The candy is sold in Original, Chewy, and Morphs varieties.

The name Now and Later was meant to suggest to customers that they can eat some now and save some for later.

== Company history ==
Now and Later was created in Brooklyn, New York in 1962 by Phoenix Candy Company. In the 1960s and '70s, Phoenix sold sold several candy-and-a-toy products, including Flash Gordon toys alongside Now and Later candy. In 1978, Phoenix was sold to Beatrice Foods. In 1983, Beatrice sold its confection company to Huhtamaki Oy of Finland, which merged its candy businesses under the Leaf name by 1986. Phoenix was then sold to Finnish investment firm Kouri Capital and became Phoenix Confections.

In December 1992, Nabisco acquired Phoenix and placed Now and Later within its LifeSavers division. When Nabisco was bought by Phillip Morris in 2000, Now and Later became a Kraft Foods brand. In 2002, Catterton Partners purchased several confectionary brands from Kraft and Hershey to form Farley's & Sathers Candy Company. The Now and Later brand was included in this deal. In 2012, Farley's & Sathers Candy Company merged with Ferrara Pan Candy Company and the name of the company was changed to Ferrara Candy Company.

== Flavors ==
The twelve flavors of Now and Later available are apple, banana, blue raspberry, cherry/apple splits, cherry, grape, strawberry, tropical lemonade, tropical punch, watermelon, wild fruits, and "original" (also known as "pineapple" or "original pineapple").

== See also ==
- Starburst
- List of confectionery brands
- Mamba
