= Spree (candy) =

Fruit-flavored candy made since the 1960s

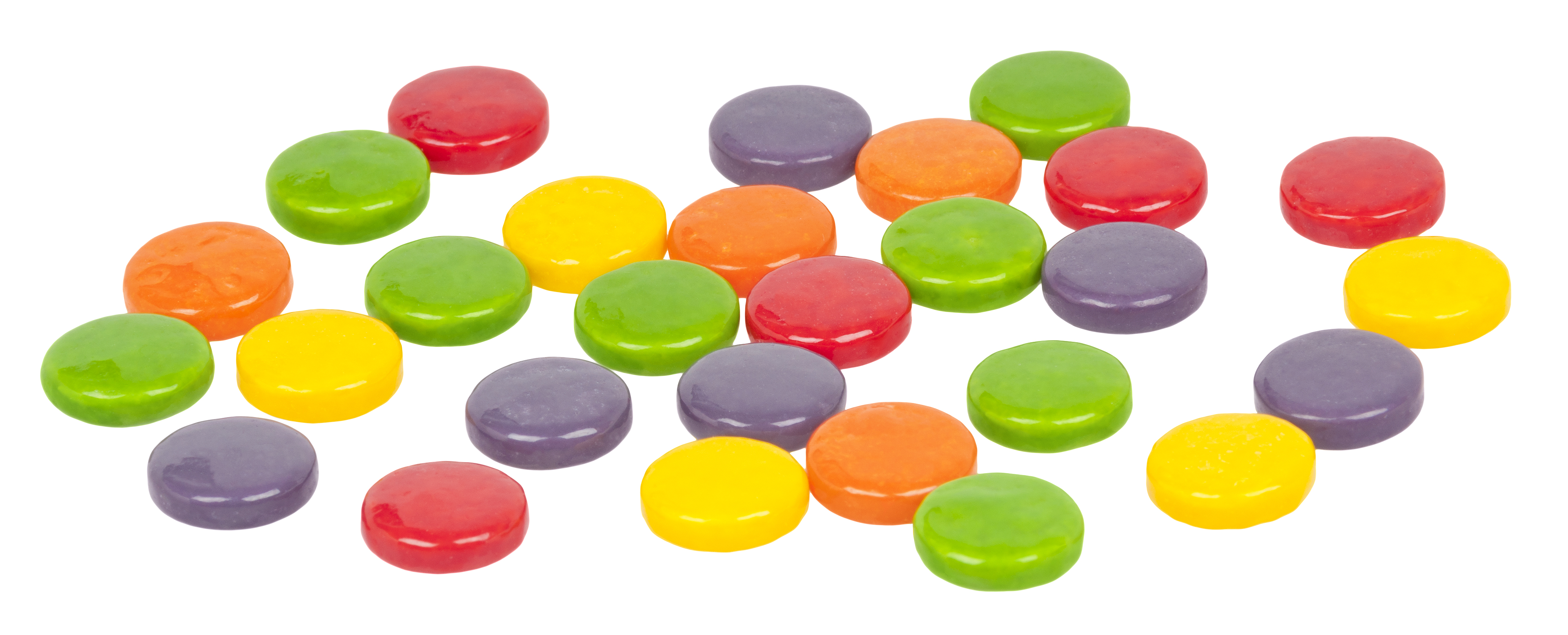
Spree candy pieces

Spree is a candy manufactured by The Willy Wonka Candy Company, a brand owned by the Ferrara Candy Company unit of Ferrero SpA. Spree was created by the Sunline Candy Company, later renamed Sunmark Corporation, of St. Louis, Mo., in the mid-1960s. Spree was an idea of an employee named John Scout. In the 1970s the brand was bought by Nestlé, which markets the candy under the Willy Wonka brand.

Spree is classified as a compressed dextrose candy, covered in a colored fruit-flavored shell. Depending on the market it is available in 141.7-gram (5.00 oz) rolls or thin 5-ounce (140 g) movie theater-size cardboard boxes. It is billed as "a kick in the mouth".

A variety called Chewy Spree, which has a candy shell and a chewy center, comes in 12-ounce (340 g) pouches, rather than rolls. There is a Mini Chewy Spree as well that comes in a 1.73-ounce (49 g) dispenser. The Chewy Spree Mixed Berry flavor was discontinued in 2015.

== Flavors ==
=== Spree (Original) ===
- Red (Cherry)
- Orange (Orange)
- Yellow (Lemon)
- Green (Lime)
- Purple (Grape)

=== Chewy Spree ===
- Red (Cherry)
- Orange (Orange)
- Yellow (Lemon)
- Green (Lime)
- Purple (Grape)

=== Chewy Spree Mixed Berry ===
- Cherry
- Strawberry
- Blue Raspberry
- Mixed Berry

At Christmas time, Spree markets packages of candy canes in a mixed sour Spree flavor.
