= Tinglerz =

Chocolate Candy by The Willy Wonka Candy Company

Tinglerz are a chocolate-covered candy made by The Willy Wonka Candy Company. On the inside is a Pop-Rocks-like candy. They were unveiled at the All Candy Expo in 2008.
