= Candy Raisins =

American soft jujube candy

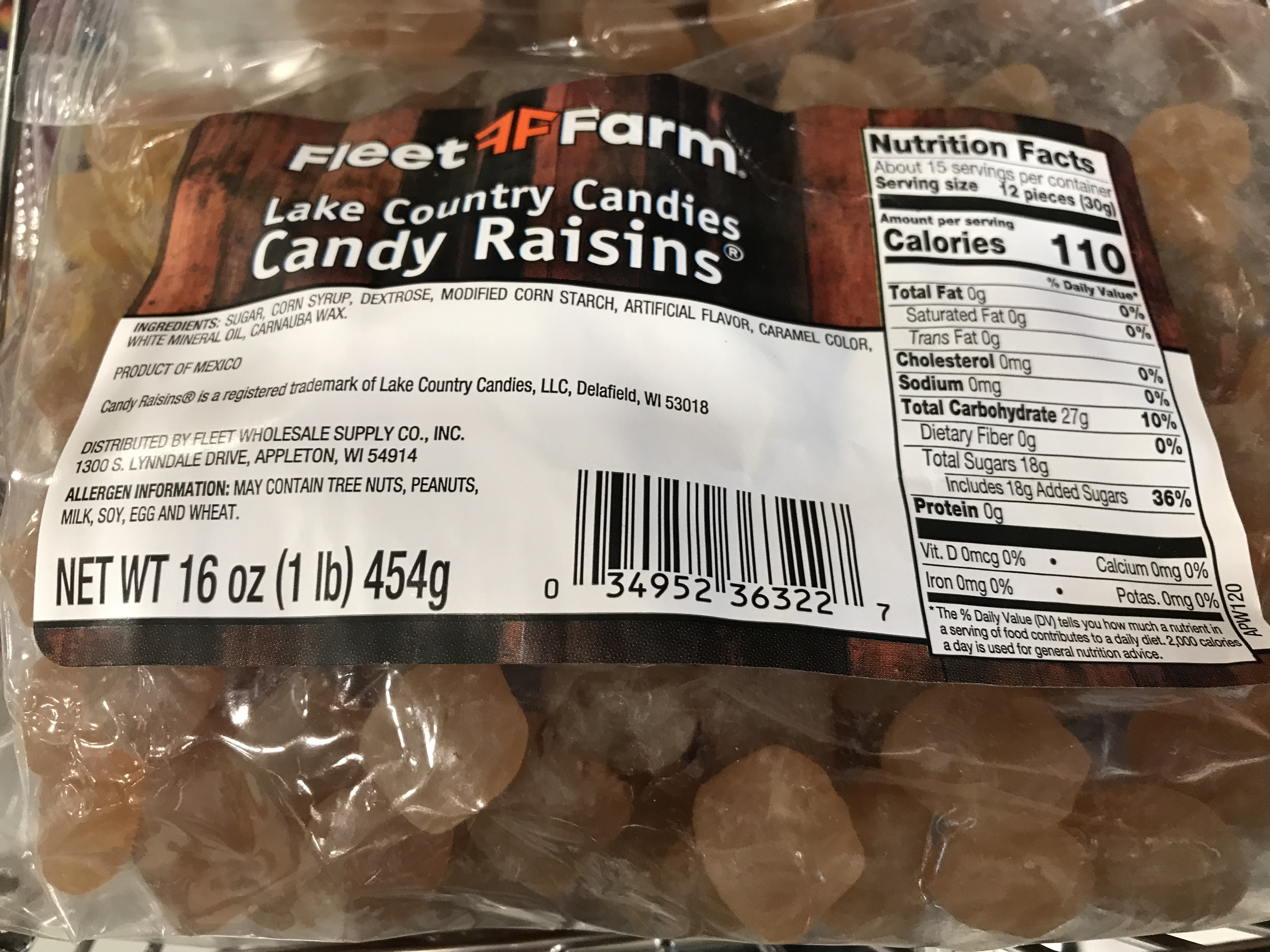
- A bag of Candy Raisins
- Type: Confectionery
- Place of origin: Milwaukee
- Region or state: Wisconsin
- Created by: George Ziegler Candy Company
- Invented: 1930s
- Serving temperature: Room temperature
- Main ingredients: Sugar, corn syrup
- Food energy (per 30 g serving): 110 kcal (460 kJ)
Nutritional value
(per 30 g serving)
- Protein: 0 g
- Fat: 0 g
- Carbohydrate: 27 g
- Glycemic index: 78 (high)

Candy Raisins are a soft jujube candy popular in Milwaukee, Wisconsin, United States. The candy was produced from the 1930s until 2008, discontinued, then revived in 2014. They were discontinued again in 2023 and revived again in 2025.

== Description ==
Though named "raisin", the name is for the appearance of their wrinkled tops, while the flavor has been compared to: "honey, ginger, lilac, perfume, soap".

== History ==
The candy dates back to the 1930s, when the George Ziegler Candy Company began manufacturing them. Stark Candy of Milwaukee acquired one of the companies in 1939, patented the recipe in 1976, and produced the candy until 2008. Stark was purchased by Necco in 1988, and continued to produce the candy at the Wisconsin plant until its closing in 2008.

In 2014, Delafield entrepreneur John Barker re-introduced Candy Raisins, having invested over $1,000,000 into his Lake Country Candies company and acquiring the rights to the name and recipe from Necco.

On May 3, 2023, Lake Country Candies, the company who owns Candy Raisins, announced on their Facebook page that their manufacturer would no longer make the candy. They also stated that they've been unable to find a new manufacturer to make Candy Raisins. The company also informed customers that their final batch of the candy would be gone by the fall.

On October 17, 2023, Lake Country Candies informed customers on their Facebook page that their final stock of Candy Raisins were almost gone, and to get their orders in while they still can. The company announced the website for ordering would shut down Sunday, October 22, 2023.

As of October 23, lakecountrycandies.com, the company's site to order is defunct, gives visitors a 404 error page.

== Present day ==
In 2024, the candy rights were purchased by an enthusiast and candy producer.

Now under new ownership, the Lake Country Candies website was once again viewable in early 2025. The first small production batch sold out quickly in June, and in August, retail bulk sales are available mail order or at the sales counter from Half Nuts, a West Allis, Wisconsin retail store.

== See also ==
- List of candies
