= Punkie =

Punkie may refer to:

- Punkie Night, an English custom practiced on the last Thursday of October
- "Punkie", a song by Sean Paul from his 2002 album Dutty Rock
- Ceratopogonidae, a biting insect
- Punkie Johnson, an American comedian and actress

== See also ==
- Punky (disambiguation)
