= The Opposite =

- Seinfeld episode
- Episode no.: Season 5 Episode 22
- Directed by: Tom Cherones
- Written by: Larry David & Jerry Seinfeld and Andy Cowan
- Production code: 522
- Original air date: May 19, 1994

Guest appearances
- Estelle Harris as Estelle Costanza; Jerry Stiller as Frank Costanza; Richard Fancy as Lippman; Marty Rackham as Jake; Siobhan Fallon as Tina; Paul Gleason as Cushman; Dedee Pfeiffer as Victoria; Melanie Smith as Rachel; Regis Philbin as himself; Kathie Lee Gifford as herself; Hiram Kasten as Michael; French Stewart as Manager; Ken Takemoto as Chairman; Fritz Mashimo as Interpreter; Susan Segal as Waitress; Oscar Jordan as Counterperson; Rolando Molina as Punk #1; Michael Friedman as Punk #2; Marvin Braverman as Poker Player #1; Wesley Thompson as Poker Player #2; Jeff Barton as Poker Player #3; Jeffrey von Meyer as Poker Player #4

Episode chronology
← Previous "The Hamptons"	Next → "The Chaperone"
- Seinfeld season 5

"The Opposite" is the 22nd and final episode of the fifth season of the NBC sitcom Seinfeld. It aired on May 19, 1994. In this episode, George turns his life around by following the opposite of his instincts; Elaine's love of Jujyfruit ruins her life; and every misfortune in Jerry's life is evened out.

This is the last episode Tom Cherones directed. Andy Ackerman took over as the primary director the following season and held that role until the end of the show's run.

== Plot ==
Elaine is on a winning streak, having earned a promotion and a raise, and gotten back together with Jake Jarmel. Pendant Publishing is also getting acquired by a Japanese conglomerate, which will bail them out of financial trouble. At Monk's, George returns from forlorn soul-searching, concluding that every decision in his life has been wrong, and orders the "opposite" of his usual lunch.

George's order attracts a woman's attention, but despite his self-consciousness, Jerry, for his own amusement, tells George to trust the opposite of his instincts. Doing so pays off: the woman, Victoria, goes out with George despite his joblessness, and he fascinates her by going unshaven; saving his temper for standing up to inconsiderate moviegoers; and refraining from making moves too soon.

Waiting for her movie date with Jake, Elaine is notified that Jake was hospitalized. She buys some Jujyfruits before leaving to see him, then eats them at his bedside. Jake realizes that she put the candies before his wellbeing, and breaks up with her acrimoniously.

Pendant books Kramer TV appearances to promote his coffee table book about coffee tables. On Live with Regis and Kathie Lee, the book gets a warm reception as Kramer demonstrates its fold-out table legs gimmick, but he spits up a mouthful of coffee on Kathie Lee. Mr. Lippman, now suffering a nasty cold, cancels Kramer's book tour.

In the span of five minutes, Jerry loses one gig but gets another to replace it, prompting Kramer to call him "Even Steven". Jerry then breaks even at a poker game, and realizes that his misfortunes always even out without fail. Elaine tests this by throwing away his twenty-dollar bill; he finds another in his pocket. Jerry stops worrying about his life entirely, even when Rachel breaks up with him.

Victoria's uncle gets George an interview with the New York Yankees. Throwing not only his instincts but all common sense to the wind, George does not hide how he lost his past jobs, and, meeting George Steinbrenner, refuses a handshake and pillories his tenure as team owner; Steinbrenner reacts by hiring George on the spot as Assistant to the Traveling Secretary. George even reveres his parents as he finally moves out of their house.

Elaine gets evicted from her apartment, having racked up a laundry list of misconduct like using Canadian quarters for the coin-op washer, and letting a jewel thief and Jehovah's Witnesses into the building. Jerry reassures Elaine that her and George's reversal of fortunes is merely his own life evening itself out.

Going to his meeting to close the acquisition deal, Lippman forgets his handkerchief, and Elaine, through a mouthful of Jujyfruits, fails to warn him. Unable to wipe up after sneezing, Lippman refuses a handshake, grievously offending the Japanese delegation and scuttling the acquisition. Pendant goes out of business, leaving Elaine jobless and Kramer's book unpublished. Elaine, dressed shabbily, laments that she has "become George" as he arrives with newfound style and swagger.

== Production ==
According to Jerry Seinfeld, the line from George's angry rant at the movie theater – "...we're gonna take it outside and I'm gonna show you what it's like!" – is taken almost verbatim from a Buddy Rich bootleg tape on which he berates his big band players for playing too loud.

Regis Philbin, as recounted in his memoir How I Got This Way, was embarrassed and disappointed with Jerry Seinfeld and the show's writing crew after his repeated line, "This guy's bonkos!" bombed with the audiences. Philbin had objected to the line prior to the taping of the episode and wanted it removed, a request which Seinfeld and the writing staff ignored.
