= Wonka Donutz =

Confection by Nestlé

Wonka Donutz were candies sold by Nestlé under their Willy Wonka Candy Company brand. They were doughnut-shaped pieces of chocolate covered in sprinkles, with a truffle-like inside. These were widely promoted ahead of the release of Charlie and the Chocolate Factory in 2005. However, they were short-lived, and discontinued, due to low sales.

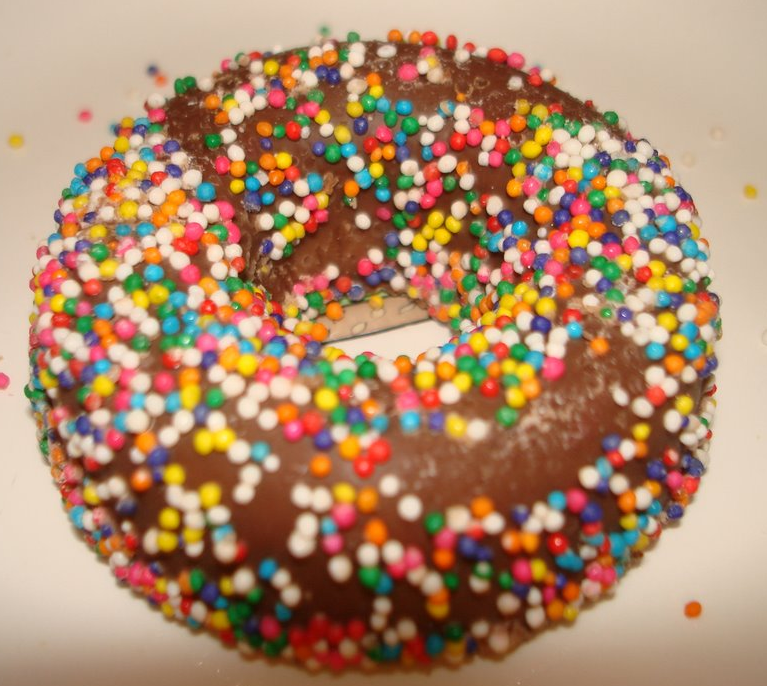

The two standard versions were a double chocolate filling (the most common version) and a double fudge filling. A special edition strawberry filling was released for Halloween in 2005.

Ahead of the film's release, various Wonka candies featured in competitions. The prize for finding the golden ticket in a Wonka Donutz pack was a trip to Europe.
