= Laffy Taffy =

Brand of taffy candy

Laffy Taffy

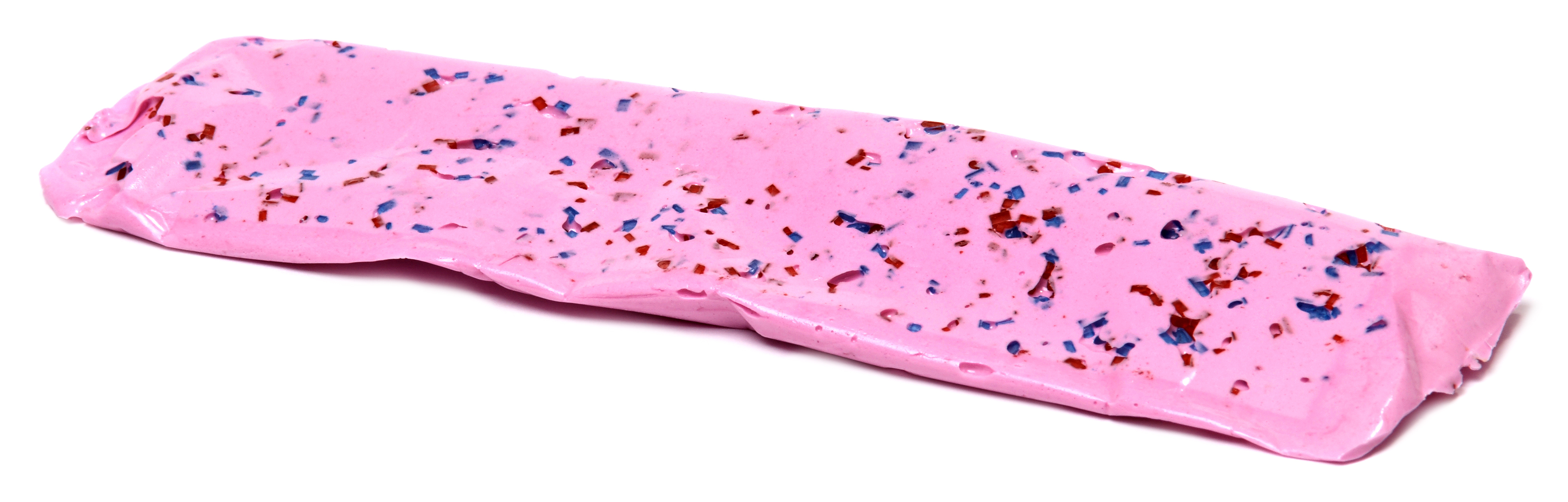
A slab of Sparkle Cherry Laffy Taffy

Laffy Taffy is an American brand of taffy candies produced by the Ferrara Candy Company, a subsidiary of Ferrero. The candies are small (about 45 grams (1.6 oz)), individually wrapped taffy rectangles available in a variety of colors and fruit flavors, including banana, strawberry, green apple, grape, watermelon, blue raspberry, and cherry.

The name "Laffy Taffy" refers to both the texture of the taffy and its embodiment of silliness: short, question and answer style jokes are printed on the outside of each wrapper, such as "What do you call a cow with no legs? – Ground beef." Some jokes are pun-based, such as "What is Labor Day? – That's when moms have their babies." Others are based on silly word play, such as "What's an owl's favorite subject? – Owlgebra." The jokes are a mix of ones sent in by fans and popular puns identified through research. In 2022, Laffy Taffy held a joke writing contest in which they received 6,500 submissions. They selected the top 101 jokes to add to their joke depository.

== History ==
The brand was first produced in the 1970s by Kathryn Beich Candies of Bloomington, Illinois as "Beich's [Name of Flavor] Caramels", though these were not in fact caramels but fruit-flavored taffy squares. The Beich's later changed the name of the product to "Beich's Laffy Taffy", which occurred some years prior to the acquisition of the distribution rights and the eventual purchase of the product line by Nestlé in 1984. Laffy Taffy was originally advertised as having a "long-lasting" flavor. Though it used to come in thick, square-shaped pieces, it is now sold in thinner, rectangular pieces. In 2003, the Willy Wonka brand introduced a variety called "Flavor Flippers", with each piece of taffy having an outer layer of one flavor and a soft center of a different flavor.

In January 2018, Nestlé announced plans to sell its U.S. confectionery brands, including Laffy Taffy, to Italian chocolatier Ferrero SpA, maker of Nutella, for $2.8 billion. Ferrero folded the acquired brands into the operations of the Ferrara Candy Company in 2019, and increased investment in marketing and production over the subsequent years.

== Ingredients ==
Ingredients vary by flavor. The following ingredients are shown on the Laffy Taffy website:

- Corn syrup
- Hydrogenated coconut oil

The following are less than 2%:

- Malic acid
- Egg Albumen
- Sodium Alganate
- Calcium Acetate
- Monoglycerides
- Natural Flavor
- Various coloring depending on product - Blue 1, Red 3, Yellow 5 etc.

Amounts of the following depend on the flavor, color, and size of each individual piece:

- Sugar
- Palm oil
- Diglycerides
- Soy Lecithin
- Hydrogenated Cottonseed oil
- Egg
