= Nerds Gummy Clusters =

Brand of candy

- Current owner: Ferrara Candy Company
- Country: United States
- Introduced: 2020; 6 years ago

Nerds Gummy Clusters are a spin-off Nerd candy product. After the candy was launched in 2020, it gained a cult following and became one of the largest products of the Ferrara Candy Company.

== Features ==
Nerds Gummy Clusters have a gummy center similar to a prior Nerds candy, the Nerds Rope. However, the latter was too messy to eat and did not hold Nerds well. Instead, a gummy gel is melted and put into round molds to produce a sticky cluster. A smaller version of the classic Nerd is made for the cluster, and the clusters move through beds of the smaller Nerds until they are completely covered.

== History ==
The Ferrero Group purchased Nestlé's American candy business in 2018, as Nerds sales were declining. Ferrara Candy Company took control of the non-chocolate brands, including the Nerds brand, and its scientists began to rework the candy. For six months, the team worked on a new approach. Despite mixed reviews in testing, the candy was launched in stores in 2020.

The company did not initially spend significant amounts on advertising. Later, the candy gained popularity in 2021 when Kylie Jenner posted an unpaid Instagram story where she said she was "obsessed" with the candy. This resulted in a spike in Google searches and sales. After Jenner's story, the candy went viral on social media.

After the release of Nerds Gummy Clusters, Nerds annual sales increased from $50 million in 2018 to $850 million in 2024, with the clusters making up 90% of Nerds sales.

== Flavors ==
Nerds Gummy Clusters consist of a variety of different flavors. Although they all have the same chewy, gummy inside and crunchy outside, the actual taste of the gummy and the Nerds flavors that surround them are what make the difference. The taste of all the different flavors can range from sweet to sour. Nerds Gummy Clusters are currently available in three permanent flavors: Very Berry, Rainbow, and Cherry Lemonade. Very Berry features crunchy Nerds surrounding a fruity gummy center. Rainbow combines tangy, crunchy Nerds with a fruity gummy center, while Cherry Lemonade combines strawberry, cherry, and lemonade Nerds with a sweet gummy center. Along with that, Nerds has released seasonal and limited-edition flavors. The seasonal flavors that they have released include Spooky (Halloween), Frosty (Christmas), a Valentine's Day flavor, etc. while the limited-edition flavors include Grape Strawberry Blitz, Cherry Lemonade Blitz, and Berry Punch Rush for the Super Bowl. In September 2025, Nerds also released a new variation of the candy, called Nerds Juicy Gummy Clusters. This variation contains a juicy liquid in the center of the gummy, and is currently available in only one flavor, Strawberry Punch.

== Advertising ==
In 2024, the company created a 30 second advertisement featuring singer Addison Rae, which debuted at Super Bowl LVIII. This was the company's first Super Bowl advertisement. In 2025, the candy was featured in a second Super Bowl commercial with Shaboozey. In 2026, the candy featured in a third Super Bowl commercial with Andy Cohen.
