= Nerds (candy) =

American confection launched in 1982

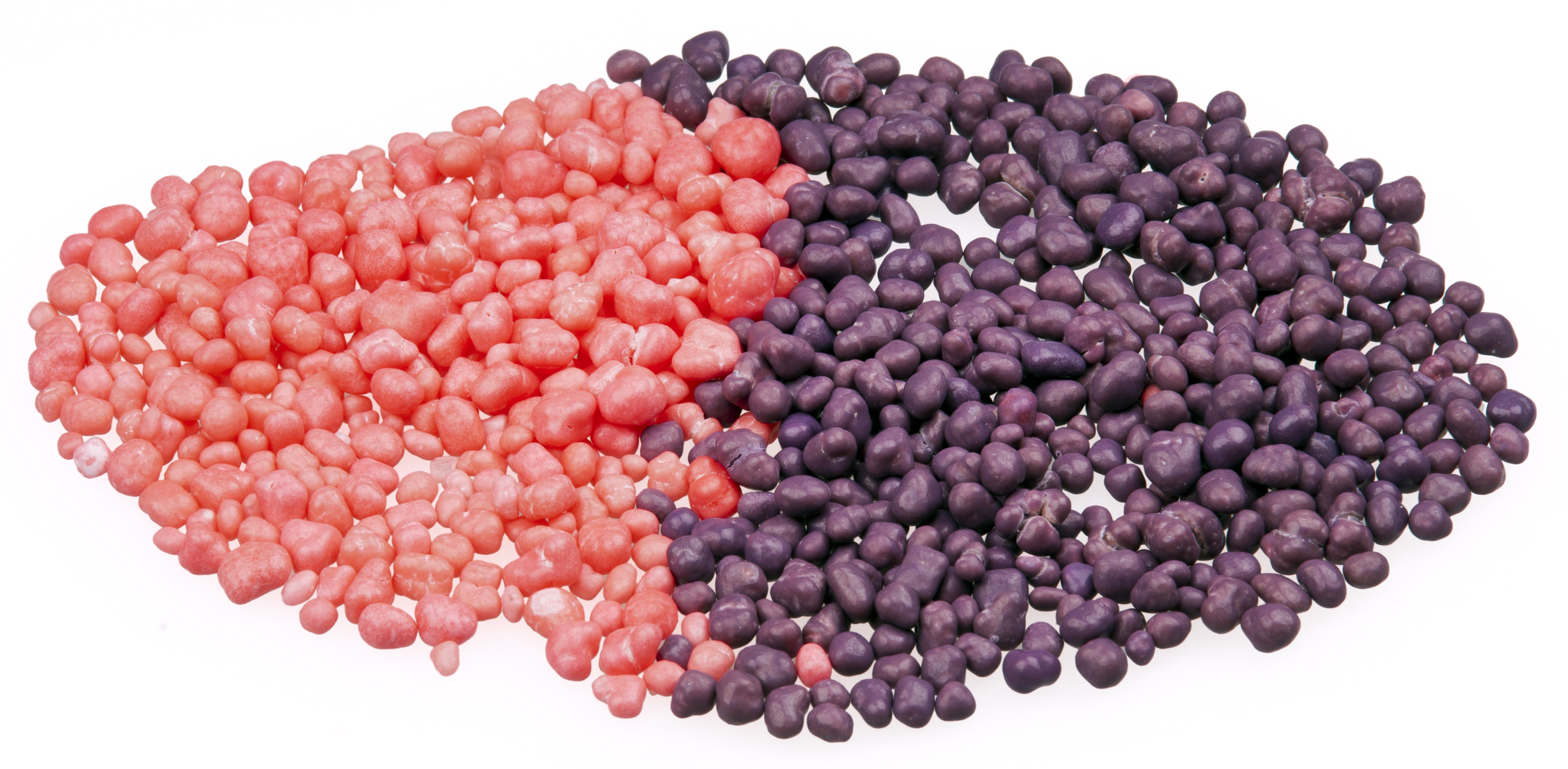
- Current owner: Ferrara Candy Company
- Country: United States
- Introduced: 1982; 44 years ago
- Previous owners: Nestlé
- Website: www.nerdscandy.com

Nerds is an American candy launched in 1982 by the Sunmark Corporation under the brand name Willy Wonka Candy Company. Nerds are now made by the Ferrara Candy Company, a subsidiary of Ferrero Group, but the brand is still distributed internationally by Nestlé under a licensing agreement with Ferrero. With their anthropomorphic covers, Nerds usually contain two flavors per box, each flavor having a separate compartment and opening.

Nerds were first introduced in 1982 and rolled out nationally in 1984. It was developed by a team led by marketing manager Angelo Fraggos at Sunmark's Willy Wonka Candy division and targeted at tweens with allowance money. The dual-chamber design of its box was driven by research that showed boys preferred pouring the candy into their mouths, while girls tended to place it in their hands.

After initial success in the 1980s, Nerds settled into a middling market status for decades until the introduction of Nerds Gummy Clusters in 2020. In 2021, Nerds Gummy Clusters received free advertising from Kylie Jenner to her 200 million Instagram followers, after which the candy went viral on social media. A 2024 Super Bowl commercial for Nerds Gummy Clusters featured TikToker Addison Rae, and was followed by a 2025 Super Bowl commercial with Shaboozey. Annual brand revenue increased from about $40 million in 2018 to more than $500 million in 2024, with Nerds Gummy Clusters accounting for more than 90% of the total.

== Production process ==
The television show Unwrapped explains how Nerds are made. A factory worker states, "Basically we start off with a sugar crystal and we just keep coating it with even more sugar." The factory spins huge barrel-like containers of sugar crystals, which receive coats of sugar until the Nerds are formed. Their original color is pure white; they receive their colors in separate barrels. The contents of the barrels are then transferred to boxes, which are divided into two compartments by a vertical partition so each half of the box contains a different flavor. Certain flavor combinations are frequently packaged together, such as grape and strawberry, the most popular pairing in the United States.

The nucleus of each candy is composed of one or more complete sucrose crystals. These optically clear monoclinic crystals are about 0.2–1 mm in length and help define the irregular shape. They are thickly glazed with carnauba wax, which gives them a hard bite and a gloss.

Nerds Gummy Clusters are made by pouring melted gel into molds to form the core. In a massive stainless steel bowl, dots of sugar are spun until "baby Nerds" are created. The gummy balls are then sent tumbling to be coated with baby Nerds.

== Nutritional facts ==
Nerds may contain traces of gluten. The article "Nerds Candy Nutrition" states, "Nerds primarily consist of sugar. The top three ingredients are dextrose, sugar and malic acid. The rest of the candy contains less than 2 percent of corn syrup, artificial flavors, carnauba wax and artificial coloring. The artificial coloring varies by flavor." The allergy warnings of this candy state that Nerds are created "in a facility that also produces wheat and egg." The normal serving size is one tablespoon—about 15 grams. (One serving of Nerds is equivalent to 60 calories, mostly from carbohydrates, with little fat or protein.) The Halloween hand-out size is typically 15 grams (0.53 oz), and the larger boxes contain 141.7 grams (5 oz).

== Early competition ==
Nerds were a popular candy in the 1980s, but they had big competitors including, Pop Rocks, Candy Buttons, and Mike and Ike. Nerds also had a close cousin in the 1990s: Dweebs. Dweebs were very similar to Nerds; but they were less sour and bigger in size. One of the most popular differences is that Dweebs contained three flavors instead of two, though the United Kingdom had a box of Nerds with three flavors for a limited time. According to Rob Bricken, "A squishier Nerd with more leg space and a surprise in the middle, Dweebs were more substantial, less sour, and displayed a greater depth and complexity than Nerds." Dweebs only lasted a very short time on the market, however.

== Varieties and flavors ==
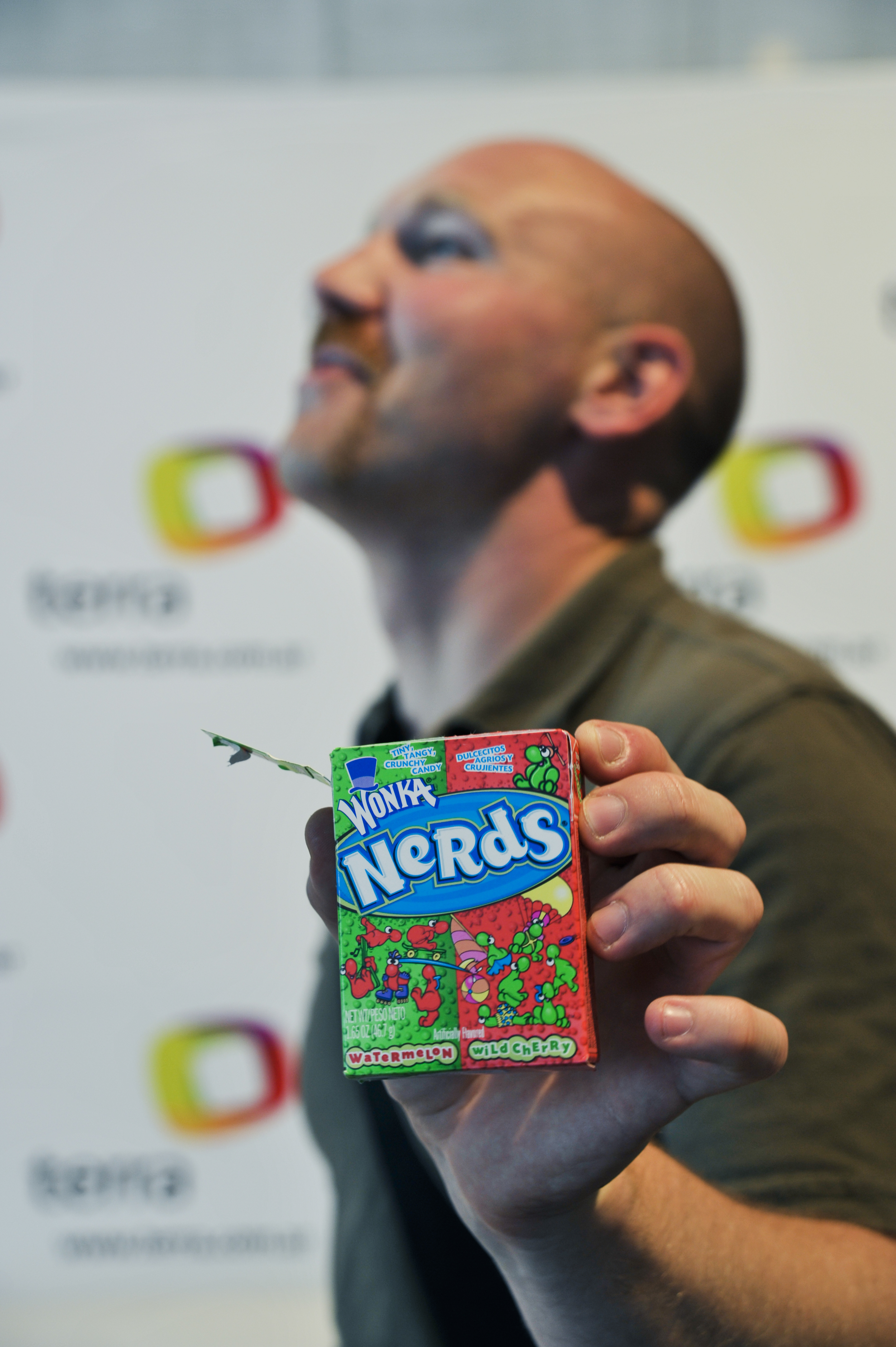
A person holding Wonka Nerds, watermelon and cherry flavor, at Wikimania 2009.

Nerds consist of various flavors and colors, ranging from extremely sweet to extremely sour; often, the two flavors in one box will contrast, and a single flavor may even exhibit both extremes. A Nerds breakfast cereal based on the concept appeared in the 1980s with two varieties (Orange and Cherry / Grape and Strawberry), but it had a short lifespan.

Although many other flavors are available, some of the current regular flavors of Nerds include the following:

- Strawberry and Grape (pink and purple)
- Cherry and Watermelon (orange or red and green)

=== Former flavors ===
- Double Dipped Lemonade-Wild Cherry and Apple-Watermelon (red and yellow)
- Sour - Lightning Lemon and Amped Apple (yellow and light green)
- Surf 'n Turf - Totally Tropical Punch and Road Rash Raspberry (red and blue)
- Wildberry and Peach (blue and orange)
- Watermelon and Punch and Wildberry (green and blue)
- Mango Chile and Guava (yellow and pink)
- Lime and Pineapple (green and yellow)
- Orange and Cherry (Orange and Red)
- Watermelon and Punch and Grape and Punch (Green and White and Purple and White)
- Watermelon and Rainbow (Green and Mixed Colors)

=== Spin-off products ===
Willy Wonka has also come up with several spin-off products of Nerds:

- Sour Nerds were larger than normal Nerds and they usually came in Lightning Lemon and Amped Apple. They were packaged in a regular box. A second flavor—Shocking Strawberry and Electric Blue—was also released. They have since been discontinued.
- Strawberry Giant Chewy Nerds, also known as "Future Nerds", had a chewy jelly bean like center with a bumpy, crunchy Nerd shell. They are the same product as Nerd Jelly Beans, but they were available year round, they have since been discontinued.
- Nerds Rope consists of gummy string with a variety of Nerds attached to the outside. It comes in original (rainbow), berry, and tropical flavors.
- Rainbow Nerds is a box of regular Nerds with multiple flavors, with no partition or organization.
- Jumbo Nerds were a box of Nerds with multiple flavors—much larger than regular Nerds. The box depicted one jumbo Nerd on one end of a see-saw with several regular-sized Nerds trying to counter its weight. These have since been discontinued.
- Nerds Gum Balls were bubble gum balls filled with multiple flavors of Nerds on the inside. They have since been discontinued.
- Seasonal Nerds are sometimes manufactured for holidays. Flavors may include:
  - Spooky Nerds, a Halloween variety featuring fruit punch (white) and orange flavors.
  - Frosty Nerds, a Christmas variety featuring watermelon (green), cherry (red) and fruit punch (white) flavors.
  - Valentine Nerds, a Valentine's Day variety in a miniature box featuring mixed strawberry (pink) and fruit punch (white) flavors.
  - Hoppin' Nerds, an Easter variety featuring pink rainbow and blue rainbow flavors.
- Nerds Cereal, a now-discontinued breakfast cereal that, like the candy, featured two separate flavors in a box (Orange and Cherry/Grape and Strawberry). The cereal came with a mail-in offer for a Nerds cereal bowl, which also could be divided in two, like a standard Nerds box.
- Nerds Gum consisted of pieces that looked like regular Nerds, but were actually bubble gum. The box featured a Nerd floating away with a bubble gum bubble coming out of its mouth.
- Dweebs, now discontinued, were a soft, chewy version of Nerds. Released in the early 1990s, Dweebs contained three separate flavors rather than two. Dweebs were available only for a very short time, however.
- Neon Nerds were introduced in 1996 and came in Pinktricity, LightningLime, and Electro Orange flavors. They are still sold in Australia and New Zealand. The LightningLime flavor was only sold in the UK, according to candy expert Jason Liebig.
- Nerd Jelly Beans, produced for Easter, are jelly beans with a coating of carnauba wax, which makes them taste like Nerds.
- Wonkalate, a UK-only raspberry-flavored white chocolate bar that was colored purple, which contained green-colored Nerds marketed as being "snozzberry-flavored" (but were actually mixed fruit-flavored).
  - W-egg, a UK-only Creme Egg-like confection resembling a larger, more squat version of a Munchie, made of the same chocolate used in the Wonkalate and also containing "snozzberry" Nerds. It also had a hot-pink colored fondant center. It was available during Easter in 2000.
- Nerd Blizzard, a Nerd milkshake offered from Dairy Queen. Now discontinued, Nerds and soft serve ice cream were not a popular pairing (this combination can still be found at DQs throughout Minnesota, however).
- Candy Nerds Slushes, a variety of the Candy Slushes offered by Sonic that feature Nerds.
- Nerds Gummy Clusters, bite-sized gummy balls coated in Nerds.
- Nerds Juicy Gummy Clusters feature a "juicy" center.
- Big Chewy Nerds are crunchy on the outside but chewy on the inside. Four flavors come in one bag, lemon, orange, grape, and strawberry.
- Nerdalicious, a product similar to licorice with Nerds inside it, sold exclusively in the United Kingdom.

Throughout the 1980s, several new flavors of Nerds were introduced from time to time; for example, "Hot and Cool" Nerds (cinnamon and wintergreen flavored), blueberry and raspberry, banana, lemon and lime, and Cherry Cola. All have since been discontinued.

== Reception ==
In 1985, Nerds were named "Candy of the Year" by the National Candy Wholesalers Association.

In 2025, Nerds spinoff, NERDS Gummy Clusters, won the Product of the Year Canada award.
