= Heide Candy Company =

Subsidiary of the Ferrara Candy Company

- Product type: Confectionery
- Current owner: Ferrara Candy Company
- Introduced: 1869
- Markets: United States

Heide Candy Company is a subsidiary of candy manufacturer Ferrara Candy Company.

== History ==
The Henry Heide Candy Company was founded in 1869 by Henry Heide, who immigrated to the United States from Obermarsberg, Westphalia, Germany. Jujyfruits began production in 1920. Original flavors included lilac, violet, rose, spearmint, and lemon. Rose and spearmint have been changed to cherry and lime, as a result of flavor availability." The current flavor lineup is lemon (yellow), anise (black), orange (orange), lime (green), and raspberry (red). They were popular in movie houses along with Heide's other gummy candy, Jujubes. On December 13, 1931, Henry Heide died in New York City.

Henry's son, Andrew Heide, took over the business and became the company's fourth president in 1957. He moved the production facility from Hudson Street in New York City to New Brunswick, New Jersey. Andrew died on December 23, 1995.

Andrew's son, Philip Heide, joined the company in 1964, rising through the ranks from sales manager/bakery and marketing and merchandising manager to executive vice-president. Philip sold Henry Heide, Inc., to Hershey Foods Corporation in 1995.

In 2002, Farley's & Sathers Candy Co., Inc. acquired the Heide brand and its products, including Jujyfruits, from Hershey Foods. The terms of the deal were not disclosed. Farley's & Sathers merged with Ferrara Pan of Chicago in 2012, forming the Ferrara Candy Company.

== Products ==
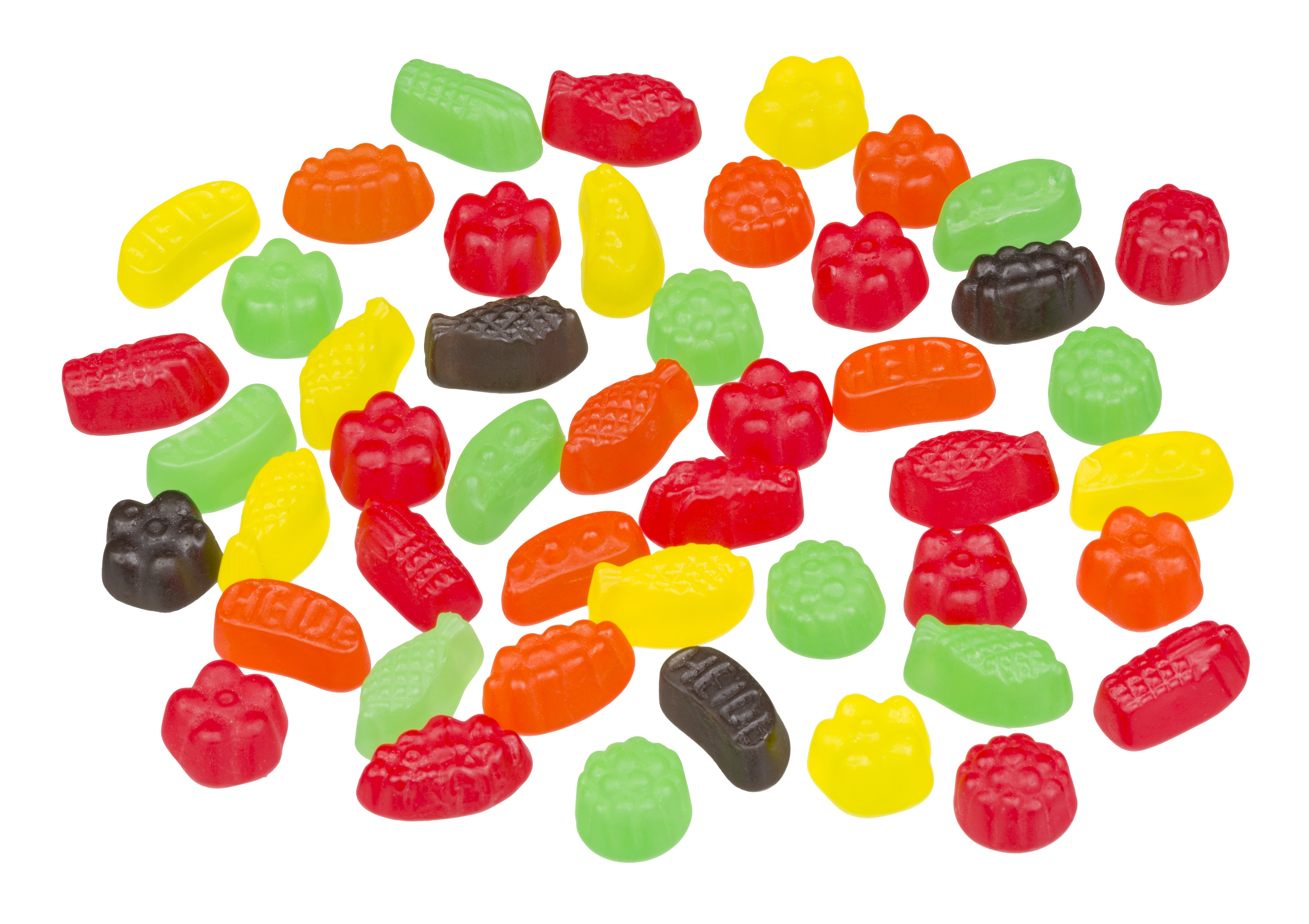
Jujyfruits candy.

- Jujubes
- Jujyfruits
- Sour Jujyfruits
- Red Hot Dollars
- Red Raspberry Dollars
- Black Licorice Dollars
- Gummi Bears
- Chocolate Babies
- Buck Private candy bar
