= Jujyfruits =

Kind of candy

Jujyfruits package design circa 2011

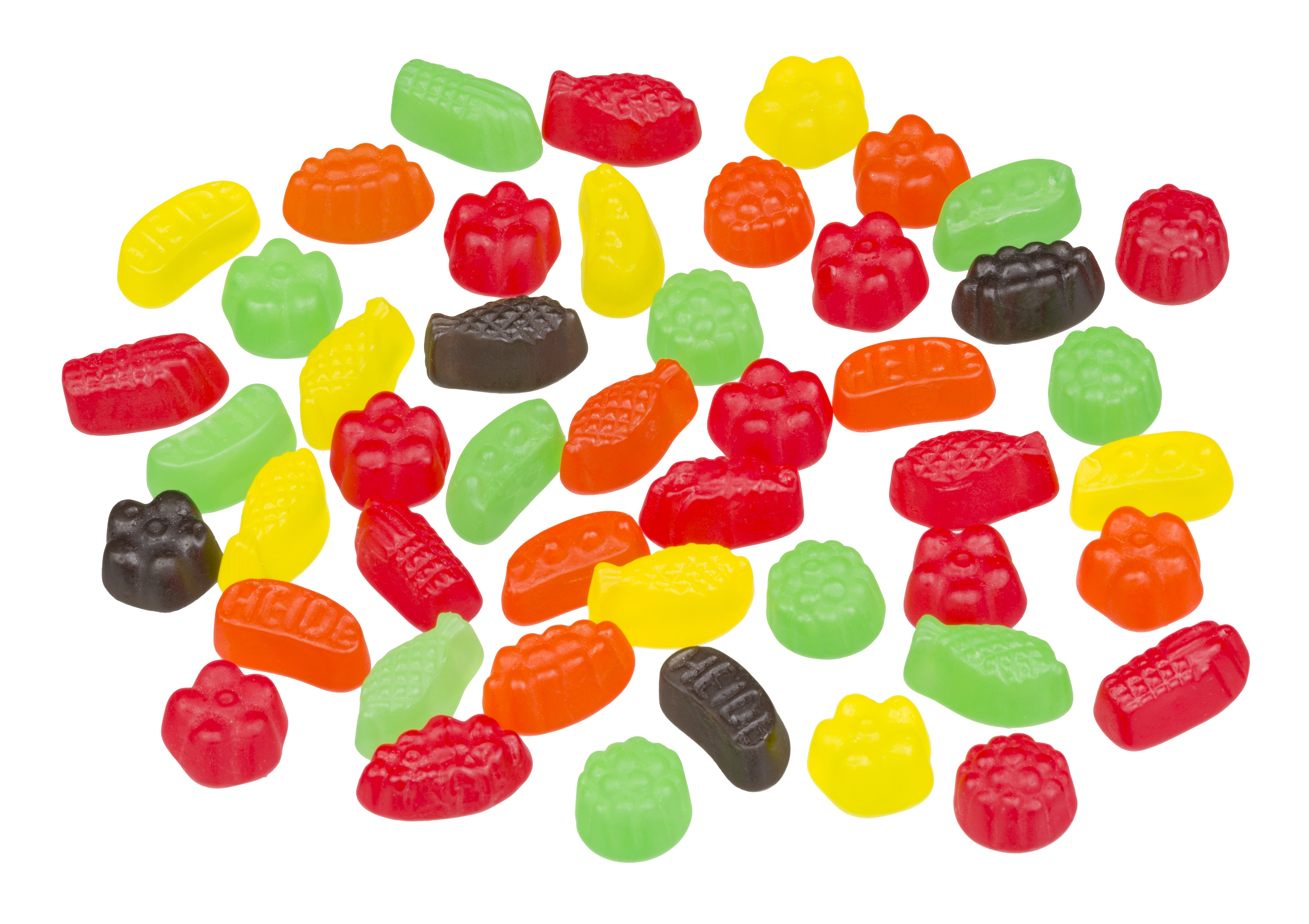
An assortment of Jujyfruits

Jujyfruits are a chewy, gumdrop-like starch-based candy, manufactured by Heide Candy Company, a subsidiary of Ferrara Candy Company. Jujyfruits began production in 1920. They were popular in movie houses along with Heide's other gummy candy, Jujubes.

== Description ==
The Jujyfruits shapes are Asparagus Bundle, Banana, Grape Bundle, Pea Pod, Pineapple, Raspberry, and Tomato. The banana shape is stamped with "HEIDE". Fruity flavors correspond to the colors (not the shapes) and include raspberry (red), anise/licorice (black), lime (green), orange (orange), and lemon (yellow). The candies are firm and harden with age or when chilled. A sour variety is also available.

Until January 1999, the green sweets were mint flavored. Hershey (the parent company at the time) changed them to lime after a customer survey found that mint was not a popular flavor.

== Ingredients ==
As of January 2024, the ingredients listed on Jujyfruits boxes are:

- Corn syrup
- Sugar
- Modified and unmodified cornstarch
- Natural and artificial flavors
- White mineral oil
- Carnauba wax
- Caramel color
- Artificial colors (Yellow 6, Blue 1, Yellow 5 and Red 40)

== Brand extension ==
Jujyfruits package design circa 1977 with the belt buckle promotion

In the 1970s, Jujyfruits held a promotion where customers could send five dollars and a token from a Jujyfruits carton to the Heide Candy Company and receive a brass buckle and leather belt in return.

== In popular culture ==
Jujyfruits was featured in the TV series Seinfeld's fifth-season finale, "The Opposite", and was also briefly mentioned in the sixth-season episode "The Scofflaw".

The romantic fantasy film Beastly features a main character (Lindy) with a penchant for Jujyfruits.

== See also ==
- List of confectionery brands
