= Weeb (disambiguation) =

Weeb, or weeaboo, is derogatory slang for a Japanophile.

Weeb or WEEB may also refer to:

- Weeb Ewbank (1907–1998), American football coach
- WEEB, a radio station licensed to Southern Pines, North Carolina
- WEEB, the Washer Electrical Equipment Bond, a bimetallic interface, intended to electrically bond a metal substrate with copper while minimizing galvanic corrosion.
