= Rowntree's Randoms =

Jelly and foam sweets

Bag of Rowntree's Randoms

Rowntree's Randoms are a jelly sweet produced by Nestlé under its Rowntree's brand. The sweet was launched in the United Kingdom on 18 May 2009.

== Product information ==
The sweets have six natural fruit flavours: blackcurrant, cherry, strawberry, orange, lime and lemon and four different textures: regular jelly, foam-backed jelly, foamy sweet and liquid-filled foam-backed jelly. The sweets are given the appearance of everyday objects, including ice cream cones, snowflakes, pigs, roller-blades, saxophones, sports cars, musical notes, paint brushes, bicycles, bow ties, ping pong paddles, flowers, puzzle pieces, buses and palm trees, hence the name "Randoms"; most marketing campaigns stipulate that no two bags contain the exact same contents, often saying that there were "billions of combinations" in every bag. In February 2012, a competition was launched to find a pack that has all red sweets in, with the lucky winner getting £10,000.

In 2013, a new variant was released, named "Squidgey Speak". A second variant followed in 2014 named "Sweet 'n' Sour".

Also in 2014, Randoms began production and sale in the US under the Wonka brand.

== Nutrition ==
A 50g packet of Rowntree's Randoms provides:

Energy - 687 kJ (164 kcal);
Protein - 2.5 g;
Carbohydrate - 37.9 g;
of which sugars - 29.6 g;
Fat - 0.2 g;
of which saturates - 0.2 g;
Fibre - 0.3 g;
Sodium - Trace;
Salt equivalent - 0.1g.

== See also ==
- List of confectionery brands
