= Dweebs (candy) =

American candy produced in the early 1990s

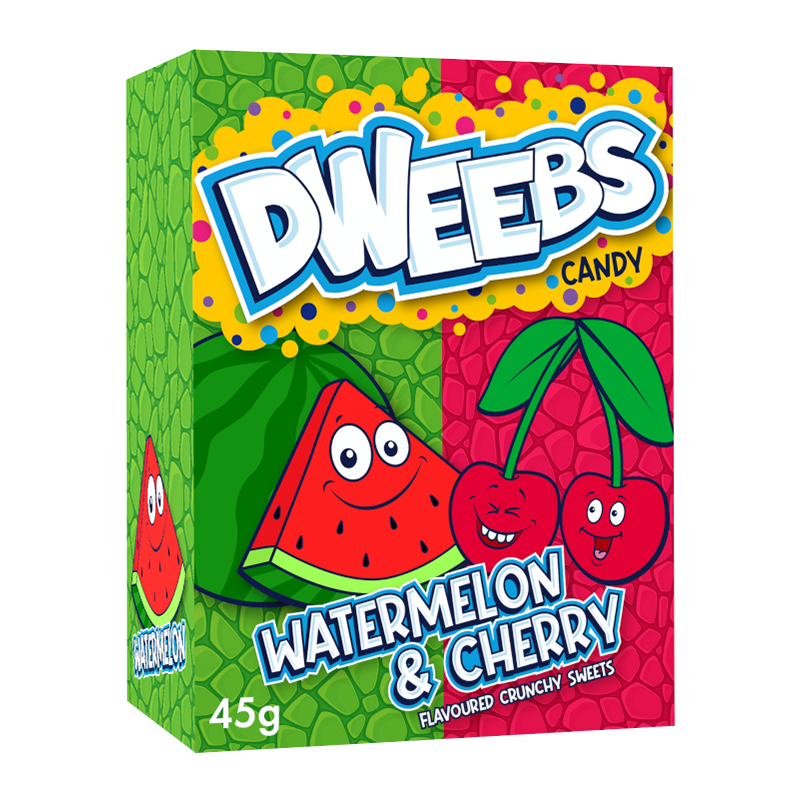

Dweebs were a larger version of the popular candy Nerds produced by The Willy Wonka Candy Company, now owned by American Continental.

Dweebs are sugar coated candies introduced in the early 1990s alongside Nerds under the Willy Wonka brand. They were discontinued after only a few years on the market, before making a return to the European market in 2022. Dweebs are generally considered to be slightly softer than Nerds, although largely a very similar candy product.

They are currently available in 4 flavours. Grape & Blueberry, Watermelon & Cherry, Orange & Cola and Sour Lemonade & Apple.

One notable difference from Nerds is that Dweebs came in boxes with three compartments, rather than two. This arrangement allowed for packing a third flavor in each box.
