= Punky's =

Type of candy

Punky's was a candy sold by Nestlé (via The Willy Wonka Candy Company) in the late-1980s and early-1990s. They came in a variety of sweet and sour fruit flavors. Punky's were small, oval in shape, and had a somewhat rough texture, with some slightly larger sugar crystals embedded in the candies.

The box art featured the candies "dressed" in punk fashion. Punky's were discontinued due to low sales and possibly to their similarity to other Wonka products such as SweeTarts.
