= The Willy Wonka Candy Company =

Former confectionery brand owned by Nestlé

- Current owner: Ferrero SpA
- Country: United States; United Kingdom
- Introduced: 1971; 55 years ago
- Markets: International
- Previous owners: Sunmark, Nestlé
- Website: www.wonka.com/us/en/

The Willy Wonka Candy Company (briefly Nestlé Candy Shop), also known as Wonka, was a confectionery brand owned and licensed by the Swiss corporation Nestlé. In 2018, the branding and production rights were sold to the Ferrero Group.

== History ==
=== Origins ===
The previous inception of the Wonka brand came from materials licensed from the British author Roald Dahl. His classic 1964 children's novel, Charlie and the Chocolate Factory, and its film adaptations are the sources of both the packaging and the marketing styles of the Wonka brand. Dahl had licensed the "Wonka" name to film director Mel Stuart. The film's producer, David L. Wolper, convinced the Quaker Oats Company to advance $3 million to finance the film in exchange for the right to use the Wonka name to sell candy bars. Quaker, which had no previous experience in the film industry, bought the rights to the book and financed the picture to promote their new "Wonka Bar". The title of the film was changed to Willy Wonka & the Chocolate Factory for promotional purposes.

The brand was launched on 17 May 1971, one month before the release of the novel's first film adaptation on 30 June 1971. In 1975, Breaker Confections was acquired by Sunmark Corporation of St. Louis, Missouri, US. In 1980, the Breaker Confections brand name was changed to "Willy Wonka Brands" in an attempt to develop the "Wonka" brand image. The company was sold in 1986 to Rowntree Mackintosh Confectionery of the UK, who were then acquired in 1988 by Swiss company Nestlé. In 1993, Nestlé renamed it the "Willy Wonka Candy Company", and then "Nestlé Candy Shop" in 2015. The original "Wonka Bars" never saw store shelves due to factory production problems before the film's release; however, subsequent Wonka product releases were highly successful, including the Everlasting Gobstopper in 1976 and Nerds in 1982.

From 1988 to 2017, Nestlé sold sweets and chocolate under the Wonka brand name in numerous countries. The cessation of the Wonka brand was due to the impending sale of branding rights to the Ferrero Group.

=== Acquisition by Ferrero and revival ===
On 18 January 2018, Ferrero announced that it would be purchasing the Nestlé US candy business and all of its US products, office locations, and manufacturing plants. The sale resulted in a payment of approximately $2.8 billion to Nestlé.

To promote the 2023 film Wonka, Ferrero revived the Wonka brand name for promotional "Magic Hat Gummies".

In May 2026, it was announced that Ferrero and Netflix would bring back the Wonka candy brand in the autumn of that year, to promote the competition series Wonka's The Golden Ticket. The revival will span chocolate products, candy, ice cream and breakfast cereal. Netflix recently announced the expansion of the on-screen Wonka universe with a 2027 wide-theatrical release animated film Charlie vs. The Chocolate Factory.

== Products ==
- Bottle Caps
- Everlasting Gobstopper
- Fun Dip
- Laffy Taffy
- Nerds
- Pixy Stix
- Runts
- Spree
- SweeTarts
- SweeTarts Chewy Sours
- SweeTarts Soft & Chewy Ropes
- Wonka Ice Cream (Peel-A-Pops and Push Ups)
- Mixups (large bags containing a variety of different "Fun Size" wonka candies)
- Randoms (Rowntree's Randoms in the UK, made and sold in the US under the Wonka brand)

== Previous products ==
- Chewy Runts
- DinaSour Eggs
- Dweebs
- Everlasting Hot Gobstoppers
- Sour Gobstoppers
- Longlasting Gobstoppers
- Fizzy Jerkz
- FruiTart Chews
- Fruit Marvels
- Gummy Nerds
- Oompas
- Punky's
- Rinky Dinks
- Scrumdidilyumptious
- Shock Tarts Sour Gum Balls
- Super Skrunch
- Tangy Bloops
- Tangy Bumps
- Tangy Bunnys
- Tart 'n' Tinys
- Tinglerz
- Volcano Rocks
- Wacky Wafers
- Wegg (UK only)
- Willy Wonka's Guppies
- Willy Wonka's Squids
- Willy Wonka's Watermelon
- Wonkalate (UK only)
- Wonka Bar
- Wonka Biscuits (UK only)
- Wonka Daredevils
- Wonka Donutz
- Xploder
