= Jujube (confectionery) =

Type of candy

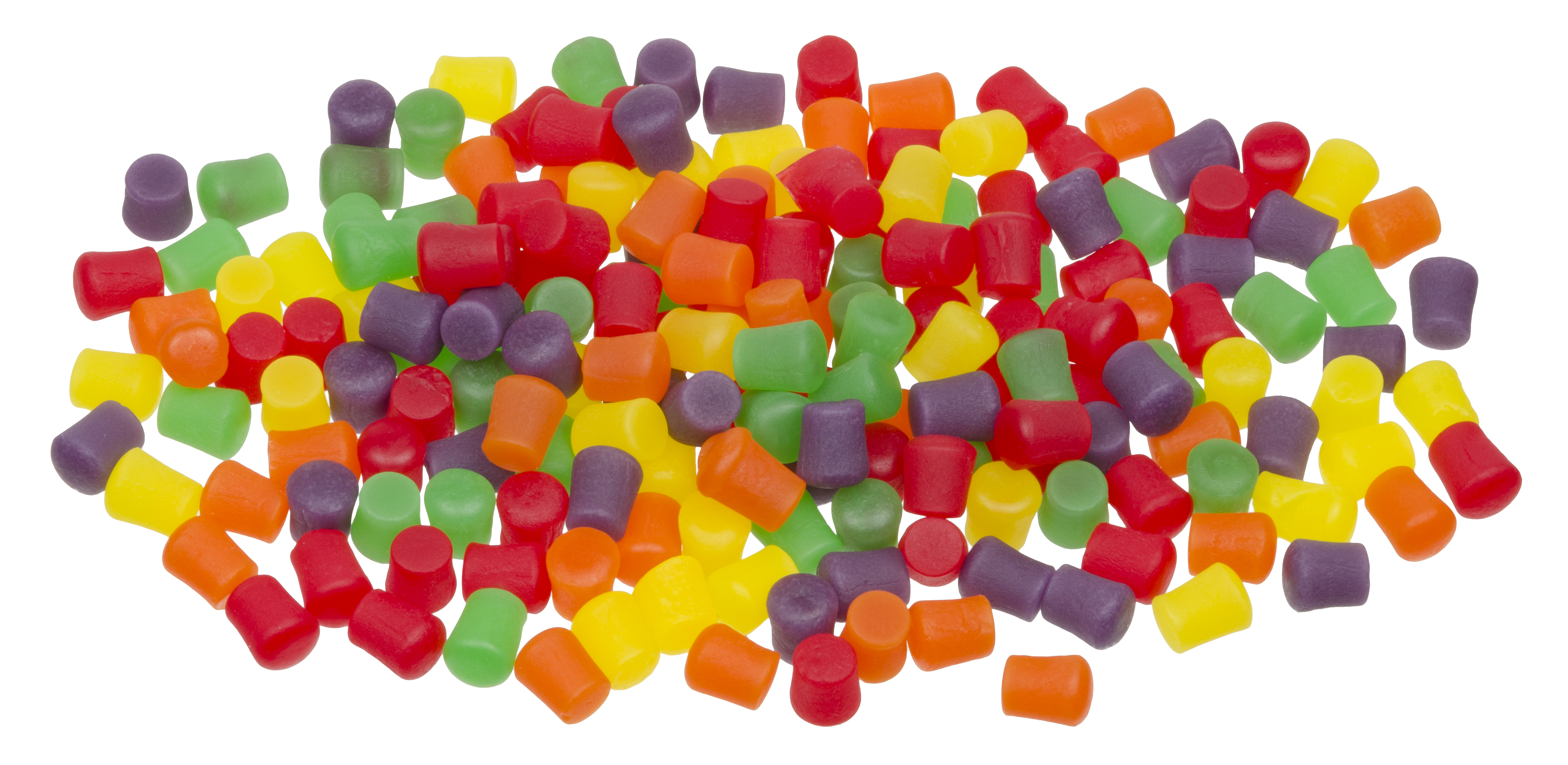
- American jujubes
- Alternative names: Jube, Ju Ju Drop
- Type: Confectionery

Jujube (/ˈdʒuːdʒuːb/ or /ˈdʒuːdʒuːbiː/; also known as jube, jubejube or juju) is a harder, chewier version of gummy type candy.

== History ==
A box of jujubes

A recipe for "pate de jujubes" was published in 1709. That recipe called for gum arabic, sugar, and the date-like jujube fruit. In 1853, both "ju ju paste" and "ju ju drops" were sold by confectioners. Later, recipes used various flavorings instead of jujube fruits.

Through the 1980s, jujubes were a somewhat popular variety of movie theater candy.

== See also ==
- Candy Raisins
- Chuckles
- Gumdrop
- Jelly bean
- Jujube fruit
- Jujyfruits
- Midget Gems (also known as Mini Gems)
- Mint (candy)
- Wine gum
- Heide Candy Company
