= Wonka Xploder =

Chocolate bar

The Wonka Xploder was a chocolate bar launched by Nestlé in the UK in 1999, and in the United States in 2000. In Australia, it was released under the "KaBoom" name.

Described as "tongue crackling candy" or "exploding chocolate", the bar's ingredients included milk chocolate and popping candy.

The bar was likely inspired by a similar "exploding candy" gag from Willy Wonka and the Chocolate Factory.

The bar was discontinued in 2005, but was re-released as "Tinglerz" in 2008.
