= Washer Electrical Equipment Bond =

WEEB or Washer Electrical Equipment Bond is a type of electrical component that allows the connection of various metals to a copper conductor.

Because of galvanic corrosion, dissimilar metals exposed to an electrolyte and electrically bonded together are unstable: the interface between the two materials will corrode one of them, and the structure will eventually fail. Copper is commonly used as an electrical bonding conductor because of its electrical properties. However, copper reacts galvanically with common structural materials like aluminium and zinc-coated steel.

The Washer Electrical Equipment Bond addresses the engineering problem by sandwiching a chemically non-reactive interface of 304 stainless steel between the metal structural element and the bonding electrical component. The stainless steel interface uses sharp protrusions to dig into the structural metal's surface oxide layer and bond electrically with the metal body. On the other side of the interface, a clamp, constructed of a conductive material compatible with copper, provides the physical attachment to the bare conductor cable. The attachment comes usually in the form of a screw terminal.

== Uses ==
The WEEB is commonly used to provide electrical bonding for exterior metal structures like solar panel installations.
