= Lemonhead (candy) =

Lemon-flavored sour candy

- Lemonhead candy
- Type: Candy
- Place of origin: United States
- Created by: Ferrara Candy Company
- Invented: 1962; 64 years ago
- Variations: Grapeheads, Cherryheads, Appleheads, Orangeheads

Lemonhead is an American brand of candy that was first introduced in 1962 and is produced by the Ferrara Candy Company. Lemonheads are a round, lemon flavored candy consisting of a sweet coating, a soft, sour shell, and a hard candy core.

Inspiration for the Lemonhead name came from Salvatore Ferrara seeing his grandson, Salvatore II, after delivery. Salvatore II was a forceps baby and he noted that his new grandson's head was lemon shaped. The candy was born out of the same cold panned process as the company's Red Hots in 1962. In this process, layer after layer of sugar and flavor are added until the candy reaches the desired shape and size. They are most commonly sold in their standard 1 centimeter size, but they are also produced in a single-sale 3 cm version. Lemonhead candies are gluten and fat-free. Ferrara now makes 500 million Lemonheads per year.

Some time between the 1980s and late 1990s, Ferrara Pan brought all of their fruit flavored candies under a consistent naming convention: Lemonheads, Grapeheads (formerly Alexander the Grape), Cherryheads (formerly Cherry Chan/Cherry Clan) and Appleheads (formerly Johnny Apple Treats). Today, only the standard Lemonhead variety remains.

== Other candies under the brand ==
- Grapeheads (Discontinued)
- Cherryheads (Discontinued)
- Appleheads (Discontinued)
- Orangeheads (Discontinued)
- Chewy Lemonheads and Friends (including Lemonheads, Grapeheads, Cherryheads, Appleheads, and Orangeheads) (discontinued)
- Chewy Lemonheads Tropical (discontinued)
- Chewy Lemonheads Fruit Mix (discontinued)
- Chewy Lemonheads Flavor Fusers (discontinued)
- Chewy Lemonheads Pink Lemonade (discontinued)
- Lemonhead Ropes
- JuicyHeads (discontinued)
- BlueRaspberryheads (Discontinued)
- Raspberryheads (Discontinued)
- BlackRaspberryheads (Discontinued)
- LoveHeads (Discontinued)
- Lemonhead Freeze Dried

== Commercial success ==
Lemonhead candies have been commercially successful since their inception. Lemonheads and other sour candy can also be attributed an increase in growth in non-chocolate confectioners’ sales as opposed to chocolate companies’ sales in the 2015 fiscal year. CEO of Ferrara Candy, Todd Siwak, said, “We are seeing a desire in Millennials for cherry gummy candy, especially with sour, sweet, and intense flavors”.

== Trivia ==
=== Advertisements ===
Being the product of a Chicago company, Ferrara Pan was a prominent sponsor of The Bozo Show on WGN-TV (along with its national superstation feed), with Lemonhead specifically promoted, and a gift package of various Ferrara Pan candies often being given as a close-bucket prize during the "Grand Prize Game".

In the 1980s, Lemonhead candy advertisements were mostly centered around sports. The commercials followed a similar pattern and featured a children's sports team; the player who made a mistake would be labeled the "lemonhead". In the 2010s, Lemonhead candy commercials featured athletes as well as the Lemonhead mascot. The mascot was pictured alongside popular athletes scoring in games or otherwise achieving athletic success. In 2014, the company rebranded the mascot to feature a more mature figure as the face of Lemonhead candies.

=== The Sugar Estate at Breckenridge ===
Lemonheads and other Ferrara candies served as the inspiration for Alana Ferrara's recently opened Sugar Estate at Breckenridge. The Estate is a luxury cabin decorated with Ferrara candies, including Lemonheads. Artist Andy Thomas painted 20 Lemonhead candies across the cabin to inspire guests to find them all.

== Controversy ==
=== 2014 rebrand ===
In 2014, it was reported that Lemonhead candies were undergoing a rebrand that included updated packaging and a new mascot. While the company's marketing department said the mascot would be losing his little boy image, the mascot came under heavy scrutiny for supposedly appearing “creepy” and for lacking appropriate social media savvy. The public largely agreed and the new mascot became the subject of ridicule across popular social media platforms.

=== Lawsuit ===
Ferrara Candy Company came under fire in 2017 because of their Lemonheads due to the opaque packaging. A lawsuit was filed claiming that customers had been deceived into believing there was more product in the boxes than there actually were, due to the packaging. The Ferrara Candy Company settled for $2.5 million with the plaintiff and agreed to provide a cash payment for those who were impacted and to modify the quality control procedure.

== Health uses ==
Lemonheads are sometimes recommended by pregnant women for the relief of nausea commonly caused by morning sickness during pregnancy. Those undergoing chemotherapy are also sometimes advised to suck on Lemonheads or other sour lemon candies, as these promote salivation.

== See also ==
- List of confectionery brands
- Sherbet lemon
