= Starch mogul =

Machine for making candy

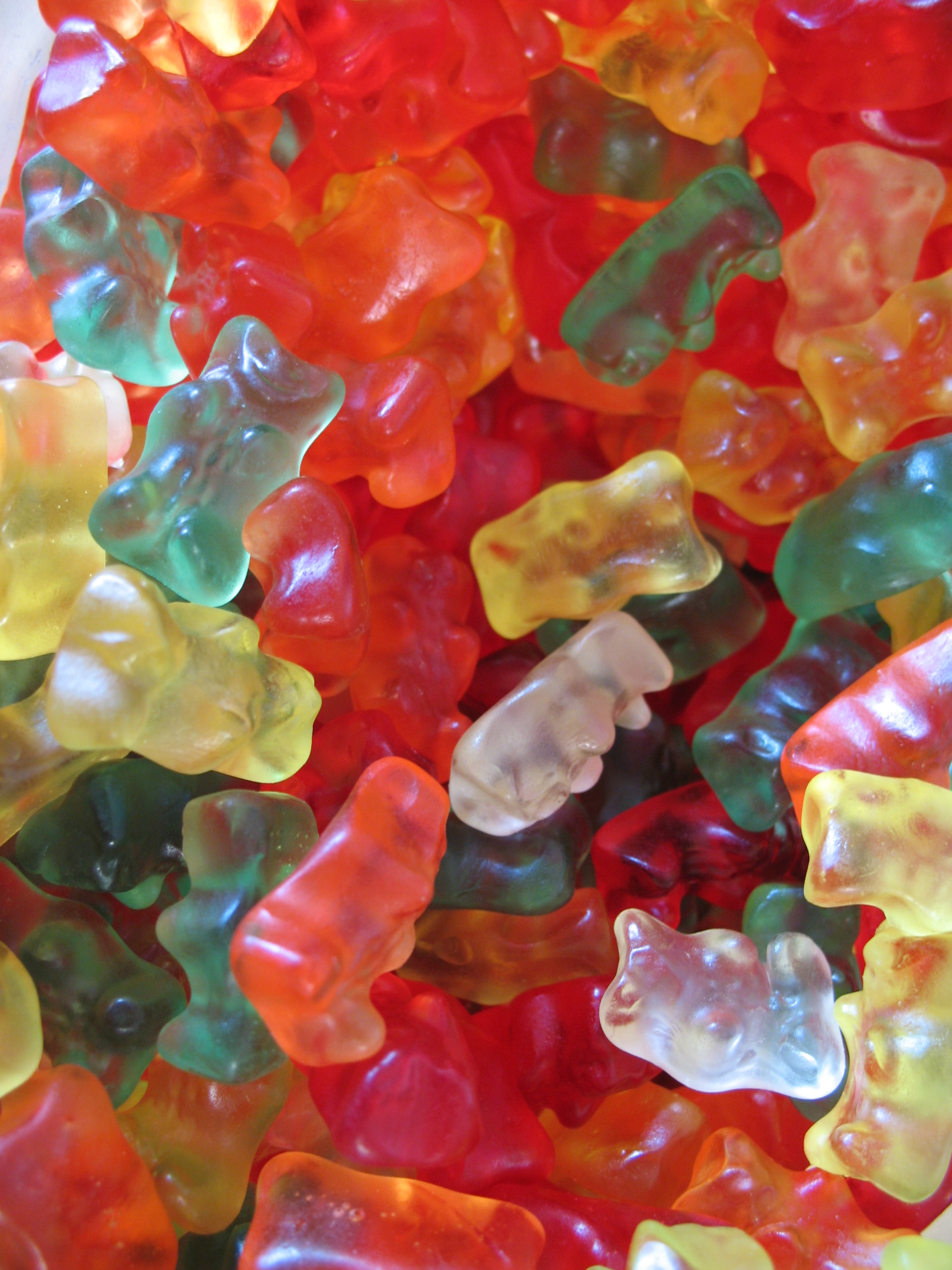
Gummy bears are produced using a starch mogul.

A starch mogul is a machine that makes shaped candies or candy centers from syrups or gels, such as gummi candy. These softer candies and centers are made by filling a tray with cornstarch, stamping the desired shape into the starch, and then pouring the filling or gel into the holes made by the stamp. When the candies have set, they are removed from the trays and the starch is recycled.

Starch moguls were invented around 1899 and were in common use within the next two decades. Early designs were built from wood, though were later fabricated in steel.

== Effects ==
Starch moguls reduced the number of jobs in candy factories and thereby lowered production costs for candies. All of the steps were previously performed by hand.

Starch moguls also improved worker safety. Previously, starch rooms tended to have dangerously high levels of starch in the air. Workers would breathe this and develop respiratory illnesses. By reducing the amount of combustible starch in the air, the machines also significantly reduced the risk of dust explosions and fire.

== Method ==
The starch mogul system is a method of molding candy that allows for the use of materials that are more runny compared to normal processes. It is used in the manufacture of jelly beans and gummy bears, and was formerly used in the manufacture of marshmallows before the advent of the extrusion process. The starch mogul system uses a machine with trays of starch. Each tray has a mold firmly pushed down in it to create cavities in the starch. The cavities are then filled with the candy material, and allowed to cool or harden as necessary. During this time, the starch helps absorb excess water, making the candy moldings handleable. Finally, the trays are dumped and the candy is separated from the starch, which is then dried and reused by the machine. Hans Arthur Faerber, founder of NID Pty Ltd, created the current form of the starch mogul system in 1952.

Potato starch is considered unsuitable, as it has a tendency to clump when drying. More typical choices are wheat, rice, or corn (maize) starch.
