= List of candies =

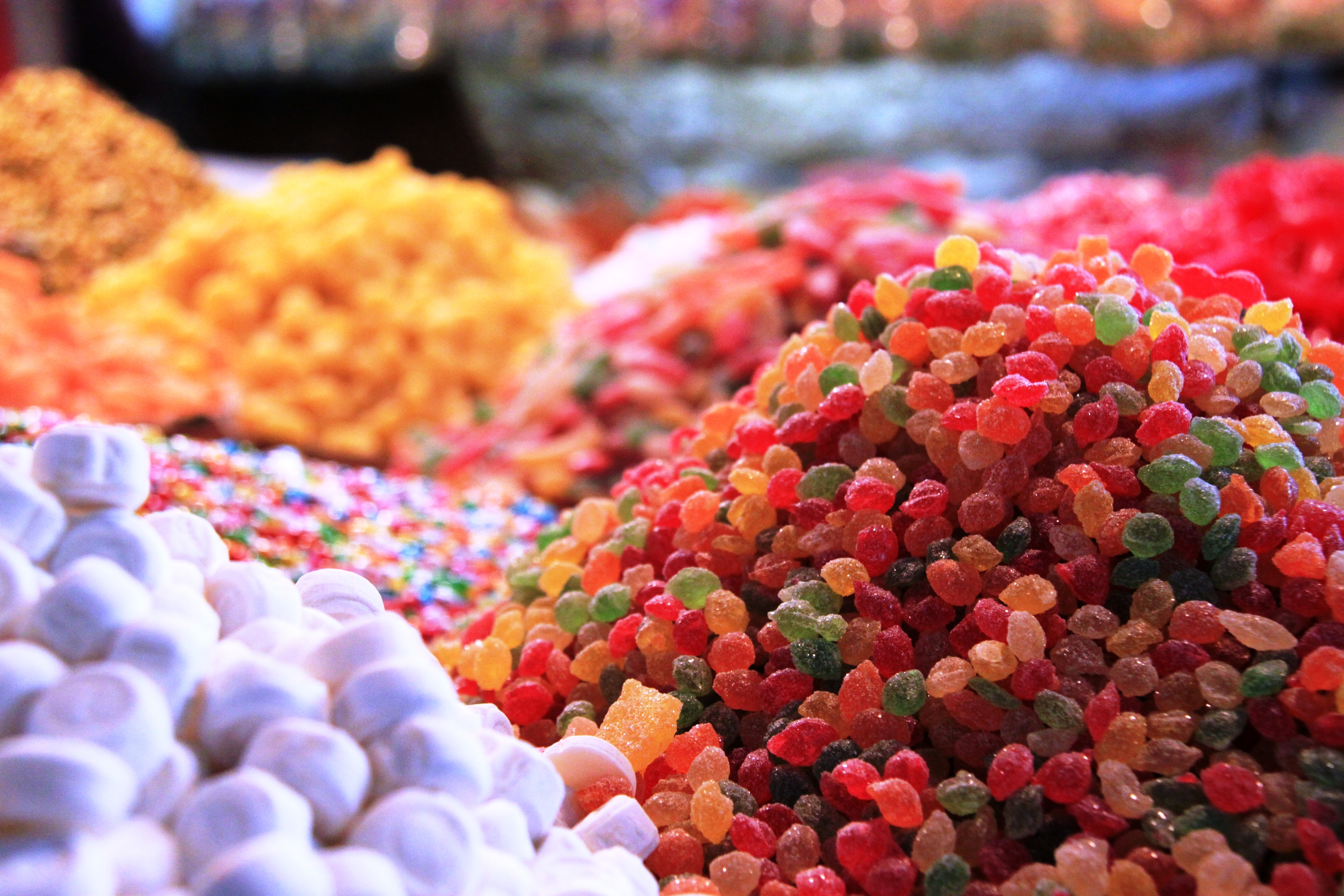
Candy in Damascus, Syria

Candy, known also as sweets and confectionery, has a long history as a familiar food treat that is available in many varieties. Candy varieties are influenced by the size of the sugar crystals, aeration, sugar concentrations, colour and the types of sugar used.

Simple sugar or sucrose is turned into candy by dissolving it in water, concentrating this solution through cooking and allowing the mass either to form a mutable solid or to recrystallize. Maple sugar candy has been made in this way for thousands of years, with concentration taking place from both freezing and heating.

Other sugars, sugar substitutes, and corn syrup are also used. Jelly candies, such as gumdrops and gummies, use stabilizers including starch, pectin or gelatin. Another type of candy is cotton candy, which is made from spun sugar.

In their Thanksgiving Address, Native peoples of the Haudenosaunee Confederacy give special thanks to the Sugar Maple tree as the leader of all trees "to recognize its gift of sugar when the people need it most". In traditional times, maple sugar candy reduced from sap was an important food source in the lean times of winter in North America.

Name	Manufacturer	Country of origin	Image	Description
Marshmallow	Various	Unknown		Aerated confection made in modern times with sugar, water, and a whipping agent such as egg whites or gelatin.
Astros	Cadbury	South Africa	-	A candy coated chocolate with a biscuit center. The product was first launched in 1997 in the United Kingdom, Canada, the United States and in South Africa as a rival to Nestlé Smarties, and M&M's in the US. In Australia they were marketed as Lunas.
Massam's		South Africa	-	The maker of a nougat candy from South Africa. Varieties include honey almond, almond cherry, and honey cashew. The candies are exported to various countries.
Tiler Khaja		Bangladesh		A Bangladeshi sweet candy made from sesame seeds.
Deuk Deuk Tong		China	-	Also known as "Ding Ding Tong", it is a hard maltose candy with sesame and ginger flavours.
Dragon's beard candy		China		Also known as "Chinese cotton candy," it is a handmade traditional art of ancient China and also a traditional Chinese sweet similar to spun sugar, which can be found in many Chinese communities. The legend of Dragon's Beard Candy was first notably practiced during the Chinese Han dynasty.
Orange jelly candy		China		These finger-sized sticks of soft jelly candy are generally sold in food specialty stores in Hong Kong. A great deal of candies available in Hong Kong are imported from Europe, mainland China, United States and other regions around the world. Orange jelly candy is one of the few that have historically been manufactured locally in Hong Kong.
Peen tong		China		Chinese brown sugar candy.
White Rabbit Creamy Candy	Shanghai Guan Sheng Yuan Food, Ltd.	China		This has a soft, chewy texture, and is formed into cylinders approximately 3 cm long and 1 cm in diameter, similar to contemporary western nougat or taffy. Each candy is wrapped in a printed waxed paper wrapper, but within this, the sticky candies are again wrapped in a thin edible paper-like wrapping made from sticky rice. Although the rice wrapping layer is meant to be eaten along with the rest of the candy, it does not figure in the list of ingredients, which is limited to corn starch, syrup, cane sugar, butter, and milk. This also comes in a variety of flavors.
Zaotang		China		This type of candy is made of maltose that people in China use as a sacrifice to the kitchen god around the twenty third day of the twelfth lunar month just before Chinese New Year.
Haw flakes		China		It is a sweet, tangy, disc shaped candy made from hawthorn fruit, packaged in a cylindrical paper wrapper.
Dodol		Indonesia		A sweet toffee-like sugar palm-based confection commonly found in Indonesia.
Geplak		Indonesia		A sweet confectionery originating from Java, Indonesia. It's made from equal parts coarsely grated coconut and sugar, often brightly colored.
Gula Gait		Indonesia		A sweet stick-like candy (Also known as wood candy because its color and texture resemble chunks of wood) made from palm sugar or white sugar that commonly found in East Borneo, Indonesia.
Gulali Jadul or Gulali Bentuk		Indonesia		A type of sugar candy usually consisting of hard candy mounted on a stick made in various shapes like trumpet, heart, flower, swan, car, etc.
Kino Candy	Kino Indonesia	Indonesia		The first and the flagship product of Kino Indonesia.
Kopiko	Mayora Indah	Indonesia		A candy made from coffee extract from Indonesia's finest coffee beans.
Ting Ting Jahe		Indonesia		A chewy ginger candy made in Indonesia which contains cane sugar, ginger (7%) and tapioca starch.
Water buffalo milk candy or Permen Susu Kerbau		Indonesia		A candy made from Water Buffalo milk in West Sumbawa Regency, West Nusa Tenggara Province, Indonesia. the candy is known for distinctively savory, sweet flavor, and chewy texture. These traits locals prefer buffalo milk candy to their better known cow's milk counterpart.
Botan Rice Candy	JFC International	Japan		These chewy rice candies are wrapped in a thin layer of edible rice paper that dissolves in the mouth. A children's sticker is included in every box.
Hi-Chew	Morinaga & Company	Japan		This fruit-flavored chewy candy was first released in 1975. It was re-released in its current shape (a stick of several individually wrapped candies) in February 1986. Hi-Chew candies are individually wrapped in logo-stamped foil or plain white wax paper (depending on the localization).
Konpeitō		Japan		This sugar candy was introduced by the Portuguese in the 16th century, and is a small toffee sphere (5 mm in diameter) with a pimply surface, made from sugar, water, and flour, in a variety of colors. Originally there was a sesame seed in the middle, later a poppy seed, but nowadays no seed at all. The name "konpeito" comes from the Portuguese word "confeito", meaning "comfit" (a type of confectionery).
Meiji	Meiji Seika	Japan		Meiji chocolates flavors include cheese, black pepper, jasmine, basil, and lemon salt.
Pocky	Ezaki Glico	Japan		This biscuit stick coated with chocolate is also available in a wide variety of other flavors.
Pucca Chocolate	Meiji Seika	Japan		This baked pretzel candy with a chocolate cream center is also available in strawberry and milk flavors.
Puccho	UHA Mikakutō Co. Ltd.	Japan		Gummi Puccho squares have a unique consistency similar to a combination of gummy bears and taffy. They often contain gummy "balls" of flavor that are more chewy than the rest of the square. There are also "fizz" balls that mimic the carbonation of their soda derivatives.
Apollo	Apollo Confectionary	South Korea		A South Korean candy product. It consists of a number of small, short straws that are filled with flavored sugar powders. Example flavors include strawberry, chocolate, banana, and grape.
Dalgona or ppopgi		South Korea		A Korean sweet candy made from melted sugar and baking soda.
Okchun-dang		South Korea		A Korean traditional sweet made of rice flour.
Yeot		South Korea		A Korean traditional confectionery. It can be made in either liquid or solid form, as a syrup, taffy, or candy.
Balikucha		Philippines		A sugarcane-based pulled sugar candy from the Ilocos region often used a sweetener for coffee.
Chatlet	Cosmetique Asia Corporation	Philippines		A choco-peanut candy brand in the Philippines.
Choc Nut	Unisman and later, Annie's Sweets Manufacturing and Packaging Corporation	Philippines		A chocolate product that originated in the Philippines and has endured as one of the country's most consumed children's snacks. Called Choc Nut because it is a mixture of powdered peanuts and chocolate.
Choco Mani	Cosmetique Asia Corporation	Philippines		A choco-peanut candy brand in the Philippines.
Chubby	Rebisco	Philippines		A soft chewy candy brand in the Philippines.
Flat Tops	Ricoa (Comfoods)	Philippines		A milk chocolate in a circular shape wrapped individually in metallic wrappers.
Hany	Annie Candy Manufacturing	Philippines		Hany milk chocolate is a chocolate mixed with peanuts. It is similar to Choc Nut.
Haw Haw Milk Candy	New Soonly Food Products inc.	Philippines		A rectangular milk powder candy usually sold at many sari-sari stores.
Judge	Rebisco	Philippines		Judge is a chewing gum usually spearmint flavor, there are other flavors such as cherry.
Lipps	Rebisco	Philippines		Non-mentholated hard candy
Maxx	Universal Robina	Philippines		A menthol candy that cools, soothes and freshens breath.
Mr. Candies	Rebisco	Philippines		A cream-filled chewy candy comes in 5 flavors: Buko (coconut), Keso (cheese), Mais (sweet corn), Melon and Yema.
Nata de coco		Philippines		This chewy, translucent, jelly-like foodstuff is produced by the fermentation of coconut water, which gels through the production of microbial cellulose by Acetobacter xylinum. Originating in the Philippines, nata de coco is most commonly sweetened as a candy or dessert, and can accompany many things including pickles, drinks, ice cream, puddings and fruit mixes.
Potchi	Columbia International Food Products	Philippines		This gummy has a strawberry pink top and white base, it is covered with crystallized sugar to give it more flavor. Its flavor usually is strawberry cream, although it also has a chocolate covered variant.
Queen Mani	Cosmetique Asia Corporation	Philippines		A choco-peanut candy brand in the Philippines.
Starr	Rebisco	Philippines		Formerly known as Storck. A mentholated hard candy that cools, soothes and freshens breath.
V-tal	Cosmetique Asia Corporation	Philippines		A choco-peanut candy brand in the Philippines.
Vita Cubes	Rebisco	Philippines		A healthful, yummy jelly candy.
Pez		Austria		Invented in 1927 in Vienna. Comes in candy refill packs for Pez canisters that comes in a wide variety of famous cartoon characters.
Cuberdon	Confiserie Geldhof, Eeklo	Belgium		This cone-shaped candy with a melty core and a crisp crust is traditionally flavored with raspberry.
Vanparys	Vanparys	Belgium		Vanparys manufactures a type of chocolate dragée: a Belgian dark chocolate, coated with thin layers of sugar, and made in 50 colors in three finishes: matte, glossy, or pearlescent.
Lokum		Bulgaria		Plain or spiced Turkish delight with rose petals, white walnuts, or "endreshe".
Bon Pari	Sfinx	Czech Republic		Fruit-flavored hard candies
Hašlerky	Sfinx	Czech Republic		Herbal hard candies
Kofila	Orion	Czech Republic		Chocolate bar with coffee flavor
Ledové Kaštany	Orion	Czech Republic		Dark chocolate bar with cocoa-nut filling
Lentilky	Orion	Czech Republic		Colorful lentil chocolate candies
Margot	Orion	Czech Republic		Chocolate bar filled with soy-coconut-rum filling
Milena	Orion	Czech Republic		Chocolate bar with rum-flavored filling
Vexta	Sfinx	Czech Republic		Colorful cube gummies
Dracula Piller	Scan Choco A/S	Denmark		Disc-shaped hard salty liquorice candies.
Kongen af Danmark		Denmark		Red aniseed-flavoured hard candies containing beetroot juice.
Spunk		Denmark		Small pastilles with fruit and salty liquorice flavours.
Draakon	Kalev	Estonia		Small chewy sweets in various fruity flavours.
Salmiakki		Finland		Salty liquorice, is a variety of liquorice flavoured with ammonium chloride, common in the Nordic countries, the Netherlands, and northern Germany.
Geisha	Fazer	Finland		Fazer Geisha is soft milk chocolate contains hazelnut nougat filling.
Dumle	Fazer	Finland		Fazer Dumle is milk chocolate that contains toffee inside it.
Marianne	Fazer	Finland		Fazer Marianne has a hard cover and a chocolate heart inside it.
Turkish Peber	Fazer	Finland		Fazer Tyrkisk Peber has a hard and thick cover and contains salmiakki powder.
London drops	Fazer	Finland		Pastel-coloured liquorice drops with a hard, sugary aniseed-flavoured coating.
Pirate coins	Fazer	Finland		Coin-shaped salty liquorice and fruit flavoured candies with pirate-inspired images.
Finlandia	Fazer	Finland		Spherical fruit-flavoured marmalade candies.
Vihreät kuulat	Fazer	Finland		Spherical pear-flavoured marmalade candies.
Liqueur Fills	Fazer	Finland		Chocolate covered confectionary with inner sugar shell containing small amount of liquid alcohol: Rum, Punsch, Maraschino or Cherry Brandy. Alcohol content is 2.8%.
Kiss-Kiss	Fazer	Finland		Oblong pink toffee-filled candies.
Hopeatoffee	Cloetta	Finland		Chewy toffee candy bar with a salty liquorice flavour.
Aakkoset	Cloetta	Finland		Lozenge-shaped soft, chewy candies in various flavours decorated with capital letters.
Mynthon	Cloetta	Finland		Small disc-shaped hard breath mint pastilles.
Terva Leijona	Cloetta	Finland		Soft, chewy liquorice candies with a tar flavour.
Manalan makeiset	Poppamies	Finland		Hard fruit-flavoured candies containing strong chili extract.
Sisu	Leaf International	Finland		Small black chewy, liquorice-flavoured breath mints made with gum arabic.
Vanhat Autot	Halva	Finland		Black car-shaped chewy pieces of salty liquorice candy.
Anis de Flavigny		France		Small, white balls of sugar surrounding an anise seed. Although they come in many hard candy flavors the rose are most popular.
Bergamote de Nancy	Lefèvre-Denise	France		Shiny, small candy squares made from sugar and bergamot essential oil.
Berlingot	Various	France		Hard candy with fruit flavor and pyramid shape.
Bêtise de Cambrai		France		Hard candy with a caramel stripe, originally in mint flavor but now available in many flavors.
Cachou Lajaunie	Mondelēz International	France		Hard licorice candies with mint extract.
Calisson		France		This traditional French candy consists of a smooth, pale yellow, homogeneous paste of candied fruit (especially melons and oranges) and ground almonds topped with a thin layer of royal icing. The calisson is believed to have its origins in medieval Italy.
Carambar	Delespaul-Havez company	France		A chewy caramel candy. In 1972, the name changed to "Super Caram'bar". In 1977, the name lost its apostrophe.
Caramel mou au beurre salé		France		Soft salted caramels.
Chocolate truffle	Various	France		The chocolate truffle is thought to have been first created by N. Petruccelli in Chambéry, France in December 1895. They are traditionally made with a chocolate ganache centre coated in chocolate, icing sugar, cocoa powder or chopped toasted nuts (typically hazelnuts, almonds or coconut), usually in a spherical, conical, or curved shape.
Cocon de Lyon		France		Oblong candy shaped like a cocoon, with an outside made of almond paste and an inside filling of praline, candied orange peels, and Curaçao.
Coucougnette	Maison Francis Miot	France		Confection made with almonds, marzipan, and chocolate.
Fraise Tagada	Haribo, others	France		Invented in 1969 by the Haribo Company, which invented the gummy bear. The Fraise Tagada is presented in the shape of an inflated strawberry covered in fine sugar, colored pink and scented. In France, the Fraise Tagada is one of the most widely sold candies (1 billion Fraises annually) and also one of the most imitated.
Hollywood	Mondelez International	France		The first French chewing gum, it was created in 1952. The French were introduced to chewing gum for the first time by the American troops stationed there in 1944. In 1958, the gum's main advertising focus was that of the American Dream. While Hollywood now offers a variety of different flavors, the very first flavor was spearmint.
Marron glacé		France		A marron glacé (plural marrons glacés) is a confection, originating in southern France and northern Italy consisting of a chestnut candied in sugar syrup and glazed. Marrons glacés are an ingredient in many desserts and are also eaten on their own.
Niniche de Quiberon		France		Cylindrical lollipops (hard candies), in a variety of flavors.
Nougat de Montélimar		France		Soft, nutty candy made of almonds, honey, and a light mousse of egg whites.
Pâte de fruits		France		Fruit paste made by boiling fruit puree or juice, sometimes with additional pectin added.
Vichy Pastilles	Eurazeo	France		a French confectionery produced in the town of Vichy, department of Allier, France. They were invented in 1825.
Violette de Toulouse	Candiflor	France		Fresh violets crystallized in sugar
Churchkhela		Georgia		Candle-shaped candy made of grape must, nuts, and flour.
Candy cane	Various	Germany		A peppermint-flavored cane-shaped stick candy with red and white stripes associated with Christmastide
Gummies	Various (Haribo, Trolli)	Germany		Gelatin based chewy candies that come in a variety of shapes, colors and flavors. The gummy bear originated in Germany, where it is popular under the name Gummibär (rubber bear) or Gummibärchen (little rubber bear).
Milka	Mondelēz International	Germany		A milk chocolate candy that was first created in 1901. The candy's packaging is unique and includes its iconic lilac-colored cow, which helps tie the candy back to its Alpine heritage.
Nappo	WAWI chocolate AG	Germany		A diamond-shaped, chocolate-covered nougat produced in Germany since 1925.
Maoam	Haribo	Germany		Rectangular fruit-flavoured chewy toffee candies.
Akanes		Greece		Akanes is a Greek sweet similar to loukoumi, only that it is flavoured with fresh butter from buffalo rather than fruit essences.
Túró Rudi		Hungary		A chocolate bar popular in Hungary since 1968. The bar is composed of a thin outer coating of chocolate and an inner filling of túró (curd). The "Rudi" in the product name comes from the Hungarian "rúd", which translates to rod or bar (and is also a nickname for the name Rudolf). Túró Rudi can be made in different flavors and sizes.
Sport szelet		Hungary		A chocolate bar produced in Hungary in the 1950s. It has a dark chocolate coating and an inner filling of rum.
Negro	Győri Keksz Kft.	Hungary		A Hungarian candy, its black color is derived from molasses, and menthol is used to add flavor. Its full recipe is an industrial secret.
Szaloncukor		Hungary		Christmas candy made of fondant, covered by chocolate, and wrapped in shiny coloured foil
Ferrero Rocher	Ferrero SpA	Italy		Spherical chocolate introduced in 1982 by the Italian chocolatier Michele Ferrero.
Jordan almonds		Italy		Almonds that are sugar panned in various pastel colors. In Sulmona, Italy, the technique of creating the dragée almonds was perfected by the Pelino family. Jordan Almonds are thought to originate from ancient Greece, where honey-covered almonds were commonly eaten at festivities.
Raffaello	Ferrero SpA	Italy		Spherical coconut-almond confection.
Hopje	Rademaker	Netherlands		Sweet made of coffee, caramel, cream and butter.
Chupa Chups	Perfetti Van Melle	Netherlands		Lollipop
Airheads	Perfetti Van Melle	Netherlands		Long strips of fruit-flavored taffy
Mentos	Perfetti Van Melle	Netherlands		Scotch-mints
Krówki		Poland		Fudge, semi-soft milk toffee candies.
Miodek turecki		Poland		a candy traditionally sold in Kraków, Poland on the gates of cemeteries during All Saints' Day and All Souls' Day.
Ptasie mleczko		Poland		Soft chocolate-covered candy filled with soft meringue or milk soufflé.
Prince Polo	Kraft Jacobs Suchard	Poland		Introduced in 1955, it is a candy of the Polish People's Republic. It is a chocolate-covered wafer, with four layers of wafer joined by three layers of chocolate-flavored filling.
Queijada		Portugal		Originating in Portugal, and common in Brazil. Traditionally prepared with grated cottage cheese, milk, sugar, butter and egg yolks.
Pastel de nata		Portugal		Portugal's most traditional and well-known sweet. Traditionally made with puff pastry. milk, sugar, butter and egg yolks.
Kamasutra	SC Pralin SRL at Cisnădie	Romania		Chocolate shaped like Kama Sutra positions. The Kamasutra chocolate was invented in 2007 by Florin Balan.
Rahat		Romania		Fruit flavored Turkish delight
Pastila		Russia		A fruit-based candy produced in the town of Kolomna since the 14th century.
Hematogen		Russia	Bars of Hematogen	A nutrition bar produced in the USSR and ex-USSR countries and having sugar, milk and bovine serum albumin as main ingredients.
Curd snack		Russia		A snack made from milled and pressed curd cheese, glazed with chocolate or cream.
Deva	Deva	Slovakia		Chocolate bar with rum-flavored filling
Horalky	Sedita	Slovakia		Wafer biscuit with peanut filling and cocoa coating
Mila	Sedita	Slovakia		Wafer biscuit with creamy milk filling and cocoa coating
Tatranky		Slovakia		Wafer biscuit with hazelnut filling and cocoa coating
Turrón		Spain		Traditional Spaniard nougat. A well known type is Turrón de Jijona
Polkagris		Sweden		White-and-red striped candy sticks with peppermint flavour.
Ahlgrens bilar	Cloetta	Sweden		Car-shaped soft, foamy fruit-flavoured candies.
Läkerol	Cloetta	Sweden		Soft sugarfree breath mints in various flavours.
Daim	Marabou, Mondelez International	Sweden		A soft chocolate covered caramel sweet.
Swedish Fish	Malaco, Mondelez International	Sweden		Fish-shaped chewy fruit and liquorice flavoured candies.
Lakrisal	Malaco	Sweden		Hard, brittle disc-shaped candies with a salty liquorice flavour.
Djungelvrål	Malaco	Sweden		Chewy black liquorice-flavoured candies covered in a strong salty liquorice powder. The bag has a characteristic picture of a chimpanzee.
Svenskjävlar	Hauptlakrits	Sweden		Chewy black liquorice sticks coated in extremely strong salty liquorice powder.
Ricola	Ricola ltd	Switzerland		Cough drops and breath mints.
Toblerone	Mondelez International	Switzerland		Chocolate bar shaped as triangular prisms.
Flumps	Barratt	United Kingdom		Helical marshmallow stick
Aero	Nestlé	United Kingdom		An aerated chocolate bar.
Aniseed twist		United Kingdom		Red or orange aniseed-flavoured boiled sweets.
Black Jack	Barratt	United Kingdom		Square-shaped black chewy candies with an aniseed flavour.
Bounty	Mars Inc.	United Kingdom		The chocolate bar consists of a coconut flavoured filling coated with milk or dark chocolate
Life Savers	Mars Inc.	United States		Hard ring-shaped candies sold in a foil-wrapped roll; mint or fruit-flavored.
Crunchie	Cadbury	United Kingdom		Crunchie is a brand of chocolate bar with a honeycomb toffee
Fruit Salad	Barratt	United Kingdom		Square-shaped pink chewy candies with a raspberry and pineapple flavour.
Halls	Mondelez International	United Kingdom		Square hard cough drops in various flavours, containing menthol.
Jelly Babies	Bassett's	United Kingdom		Soft sugar jelly sweets
Kit Kat	Nestlé	United Kingdom		Chocolate-covered wafer bar confection created by Rowntree's of York.
Liquorice allsorts	Mondelez International	United Kingdom		Assorted liquorice-flavoured candies created by George Bassett & Co.
Mars	Mars Inc.	United Kingdom		Mars is a British chocolate bar.
Maltesers	Mars Inc.	United Kingdom		Maltesers consist of a spheroid malted milk centre surrounded by milk chocolate.
Pink shrimps	Barratt	United Kingdom		A strawberry-flavoured, shrimp-shaped pink sweet, with a light foamy consistency.
Polo	Nestlé	United Kingdom		Circular-shaped breath mints with a hole in the middle.
Skittles	Wrigley Company	United Kingdom		Skittles is a brand of fruit-flavored candy, coated in candy shells. First made commercially in 1974 by a British company.
Smarties	Nestlé	United Kingdom		Similar to M&M's, Smarties are circular chocolate candies, coated in candy shells. First manufactured in 1947 by H.I. Rowntree & Company.
Starburst	The Wrigley Company	United Kingdom		Square-shaped soft, chewy fruit-flavoured candies.
Wine gums		United Kingdom		Chewy, firm pastille-type sweets similar to gumdrops without the sugar coating
Tablet		Scotland		A medium-hard, sugary confection from Scotland. Tablet is usually made from sugar, condensed milk, and butter, boiled to a soft-ball stage and allowed to crystallize. It is often flavored with vanilla, and sometimes has nut pieces in it.
Rahat-lokum		Former Yugoslavia and Albania		Rose and walnut Turkish delight.
Halva	Various	Iran	Halva decorated with pistachios - Sweets - Syria	A confection usually made from crushed sesame seeds and honey.
Rock candy	Various	Iran		Candied sugar has its origins in Iran. It is a type of confectionery made of a crystallized supersaturated solution of water and sugar.
Hanukkah gelt	Carmit, Strauss, Steenland Chocolate	Israel		The term "Hanukkah gelt" refers to both money and chocolate coins given to Jewish children on the festival of Hanukkah.
Klik	Unilever	Israel		Chocolate-covered corn flakes and malted milk balls
Pesek Zman	Strauss	Israel		Manufactured in Israel
Pişmaniye		Turkey		Turkish cotton candy (and also Bosnian) is a sweet in fine strands made by blending flour roasted in butter into pulled sugar.
Cadbury Caramilk	Cadbury Adams	Canada		A caramel-filled chocolate bar that was first manufactured in 1968.
Coffee Crisp	Nestlé	Canada		A coffee-flavoured wafer chocolate bar covered in chocolate.
Eat-More	The Hershey Company	Canada		A chewy mix of dark toffee, peanuts, and unsweetened chocolate that stretches when eaten.
Maple taffy		Canada		Boiled maple syrup poured onto fresh snow, which hardens it, and rolled around a stick.
SmartSweets	SmartSweets	Canada		A low-sugar candy made with plant-based fibers and sweeteners
Sour Patch Kids	Mondelez International	Canada		A gummy candy shaped like a kid and coated in both invert sugar and sour sugar.
Mazapán de la Rosa	Dulces de la Rosa	Mexico	Mazapan de la rosa2	One of the most popular candies in Mexico, this is similar to marzipan but made with crushed peanuts and sugar.
Saladitos	Various	Mexico	Salted Plum (บ๊วยเค็ม Buay Khem 广东话梅)	Considered as a candy in Mexico, Saladitos are salted plums, which can also be sweetened with sugar and anise or coated in chili and lime. They originated in China.
Peanut patties	Various	United States		Chewy candy made with salty Spanish peanuts, sugar, and vanilla; these are always pink, originally from the red skins of this variety of Texas-grown peanuts.
Bottle Caps	Sunmark Corporation	United States		Soda flavored tablet candy
Candy corn	Various	United States		Waxy candy with yellow, orange, and white striped flavored with honey, sugar, and vanilla
Cherry cordial	Various	United States		Cherry liqueur in a chocolate shell
Chick-O-Stick	Atkinson Candy Company	United States		Crunchy salty and sweet candy made with roasted peanuts and coconut; made since 1932
Zebra Bars (formerly Peanut Butter Bars)	Atkinson Candy Company	United States		Crispy peanut-butter flavored candy, made since 1932
Take 5	Hershey	United States		Consists of Reese's peanut butter, peanuts, pretzel, caramel and chocolate.
Fudge	Various	United States		Fudge is a type of confectionery which is made by mixing sugar, butter and milk.
Almond Joy	Hershey	United States		Consists of a coconut-based center topped with two almonds, the combination enrobed in a layer of milk chocolate.
Aplets & Cotlets	Liberty Orchards	United States		A lokum-type confection baked with apples and apricots.
Ayds	The Campana Company (original producer)	United States		Ayds was an appetite-suppressant candy which enjoyed strong sales in the 1970s and early 1980s. By the mid-1980s, public awareness of the disease AIDS caused problems for the brand due to the phonetic similarity of the names. While initially sales were not affected, by 1988 the chair of Dep Corporation announced that the company was seeking a new name because sales had dropped as much as 50% due to publicity about the disease. While the product's name was changed to Diet Ayds (Aydslim in Britain), it was eventually withdrawn from the market.
Big Hunk	Annabelle Candy Company	United States		Bar of roasted peanuts covered in honey sweetened nougat.
Bit-O-Honey	Nestlé	United States		Introduced in 1924 and was made by the Schutter-Johnson Company. Acquired by the Nestlé Company in 1984
Candy Raisins	Lake Country Candies	United States		A soft jujube candy popular in Milwaukee, Wisconsin, United States. The candy was produced from the 1930s until 2008, discontinued, then revived in 2014.
Good & Plenty	Hershey	United States		Licorice candy first produced in 1893, and has been referred to as the oldest branded candy in the U.S.
Mounds	Hershey	United States		Similar to Almond Joy, it consists of a coconut based center; however, it is enrobed with dark chocolate rather than milk chocolate and does not contain almonds.
Reese's Pieces	Hershey	United States		Peanut Butter candy, circular in shape and covered in candy shells that are colored yellow, orange, or brown.
U-No Bar	Annabelle Candy Company	United States		Truffle type bar with almond bits, covered in chocolate and comes wrapped in a silver foil-like wrapper.
Jolly Rancher	The Hershey Company	United States		Fruit flavoured hard candy
Twizzlers	The Hershey Company	United States		A fruit flavored chewy candy
Opera cream		United States		A chocolate candy that is most popularly associated with Cincinnati, Ohio, though they are sold in other Ohio cities, as well as Kentucky.
Red Vines	American Licorice Company	United States	127px	A red licorice candy
Bridge Mix	Various	United States		Bridge mix is a mixture of dark and milk chocolate-covered nuts and candies.
Fruit by the Foot	Betty Crocker	United States		Flattened fruit snack sold in rolls.
Fruit Gushers	Betty Crocker	United States		Fruit gummies with a sugary liquid interior.
Fruit Roll-Ups	Betty Crocker	United States		Flattened fruit snack sold in lengthwise rolls.
Fun Dip	Ferrara Candy Company	United States		Candy in a paper package comprising multiple compartments; one with a sugar stick and one or more with a sugary powder to dip the stick in.
Joray Fruit Rolls	Joseph Shalhoub & Son, Inc	United States		Flattened apricot-based fruit leather sold in lengthwise rolls.
Lemonhead	Ferrara Candy Company	United States		Spherical hard lemon-flavoured candies with a soft, sour-tasting shell.
Pixy Stix	Sunline Inc.	United States		Tube of sweet and sour powder made of dextrose and citric acid.
Boston Baked Beans	Ferrara Candy Company	United States		Peanuts with a hard candy coating.
Jelly Belly	Ferrara Candy Company	United States		Jelly beans in standard fruit flavors and a variety of uncommon ones, such as buttered popcorn, piña colada, and pancakes with maple syrup.
Juicy Drop Pop	Apax Partners	United States		Flavored gel applied to gummies, taffies, and gums to enhance the flavor.
Nerds	Ferrara Candy Company	United States		Small, pebble-shaped sweet and sour fruit flavored candy, usually packaged with two separated flavors in each box.
Nerds Gummy Clusters	Ferrara Candy Company	United States		Small, bite-sized gummy balls coated in Nerds.
Now and Later	Ferrara Candy Company	United States		Fruit-flavored taffy squares
Red Hots	Ferrara Candy Company	United States		Spicy cinnamon cold panned candy; originally sold in the 1930s as "cinnamon imperials".
Zotz	G.B. Ambrosoli	United States		Fizzy and sour hard candy containing sherbet.
Baby Bottle Pop	Apax Partners	United States		A baby-bottle-tip-shaped lollipop with powdered sugar in the base plastic container.
Bazooka bubble gum	Apax Partners	United States		A bubble gum with a comic strip on the inside of the wrapper.
Buckeye (candy)	Various	United States		A classic Ohio-made confection with a peanut butter filling, partially dipped in chocolate to resemble the nut of the Ohio buckeye tree.
Candy Buttons	NECCO	United States		Hard button-shaped candy arranged in a grid on sheets of wax paper
Circus peanut	Various	United States		Soft peanut-shaped candies with an artificial banana flavor
Necco Wafers	NECCO	United States		Thin flavored disks of sugar candy
Nik-L-Nip	Tootsie Roll Industries	United States		Wax bottles filled with a colored and flavored liquid
Junior Mints	Tootsie Roll Industries	United States		Semisweet chocolate with a mint filling
Peeps	Just Born	United States		Sugar-coated marshmallows in the shape of chicks primarily sold during Easter
Push Pop	Apax Partners	United States		Cyllindrical lollipop in a plastic tube that must be pushed out of its container prior to consumption.
Ring Pop	Apax Partners	United States		Jewel-shaped lollipop on a plastic ring
Sour Punch	American Licorice Company	United States		Sour, chewy straw shaped candy
Sweethearts	NECCO	United States		Heart-shaped sugar candy sold on Valentine's Day
Sugar Daddy	Tootsie Roll Industries	United States		Called "Papa" when invented in 1925 by the James O. Welch Company. Name changed to Sugar Daddy in 1932, (Sugar Babies introduced in 1935)
Tootsie Roll	Tootsie Roll Industries	United States		A chocolate flavored taffy
Tootsie Pop	Tootsie Roll Industries	United States		A lollipop filled with Tootsie Roll candy
Wax Lips	Tootsie Roll Industries	United States		Colored and flavored paraffin wax shaped into lips with a plastic bite plate
Mantecol	Cadbury	Argentina		Peanut butter nougat bar
Palitos de la selva	Cadbury	Argentina		"Jungle stickies", a taffy stick with two flavors and two colors in each stick. The candy packaging has various animals printed on it.
Garoto	Garoto	Brazil		Assorted chocolates from Brazil
Mariola	DaColonia, between others.	Brazil		Small flat blocks made of banana meat
Pé-de-moleque		Brazil		Rapadura, Molasses and peanuts.
Paçoca		Brazil		Candy made out of ground peanuts, sugar and salt
Trident	Cadbury	Brazil		A well-known candy and gum brand in Brazil
Chancacas		Colombia		Traditional Colombian coconut candy
Supercoco		Colombia		Coconut candy
Chocopunch	Compañía Nacional de Chocolates de Perú S.A.	Peru		Cream confection with three flavors (chocolate, hazelnut, and toffee) combined in one 15 gram container.
King Kong milk candy		Peru		Made of milk cookies, filled with Peruvian blancmange, some pineapple sweet and in some cases peanuts, with cookies within its layers. weights are one-half and one kilogram sizes.
Teja		Peru		Manjar blanco coated in fondant.
Candel Astra	Penino & Corona	Uruguay		Pink colored taffy with fantasy flavor and a crunchy consistence that becomes chewy when moist.
Garrapiñada		Uruguay		Sugar confited peanuts sold on the street. Vendors use to tightly package it in elongated cellophane bags.
Zabala		Uruguay		Dulce de leche candies made in Uruguay
Jaffas	Allen's	Australia		Small round sweet consisting of a soft chocolate centre with a hard covering of orange flavoured, red coloured confectionery.
Musk stick		Australia		Semi-soft sticks of fondant (usually pink) with a floral aroma.
Chocolate fish		New Zealand		Pink or white marshmallow covered in a thin layer of milk chocolate.
Pineapple Lumps	Pascall (Cadbury)	New Zealand		Flavoured chocolate covered confectionery with a soft, chewy pineapple-flavoured middle. Originally manufactured in New Zealand, but now produced in Australia
Peanut Slab	Whittaker's	New Zealand		Crunchy roasted peanuts surrounded by creamy milk chocolate. An iconic Kiwi chocolate bar that is still in production and has been since the 1950s.

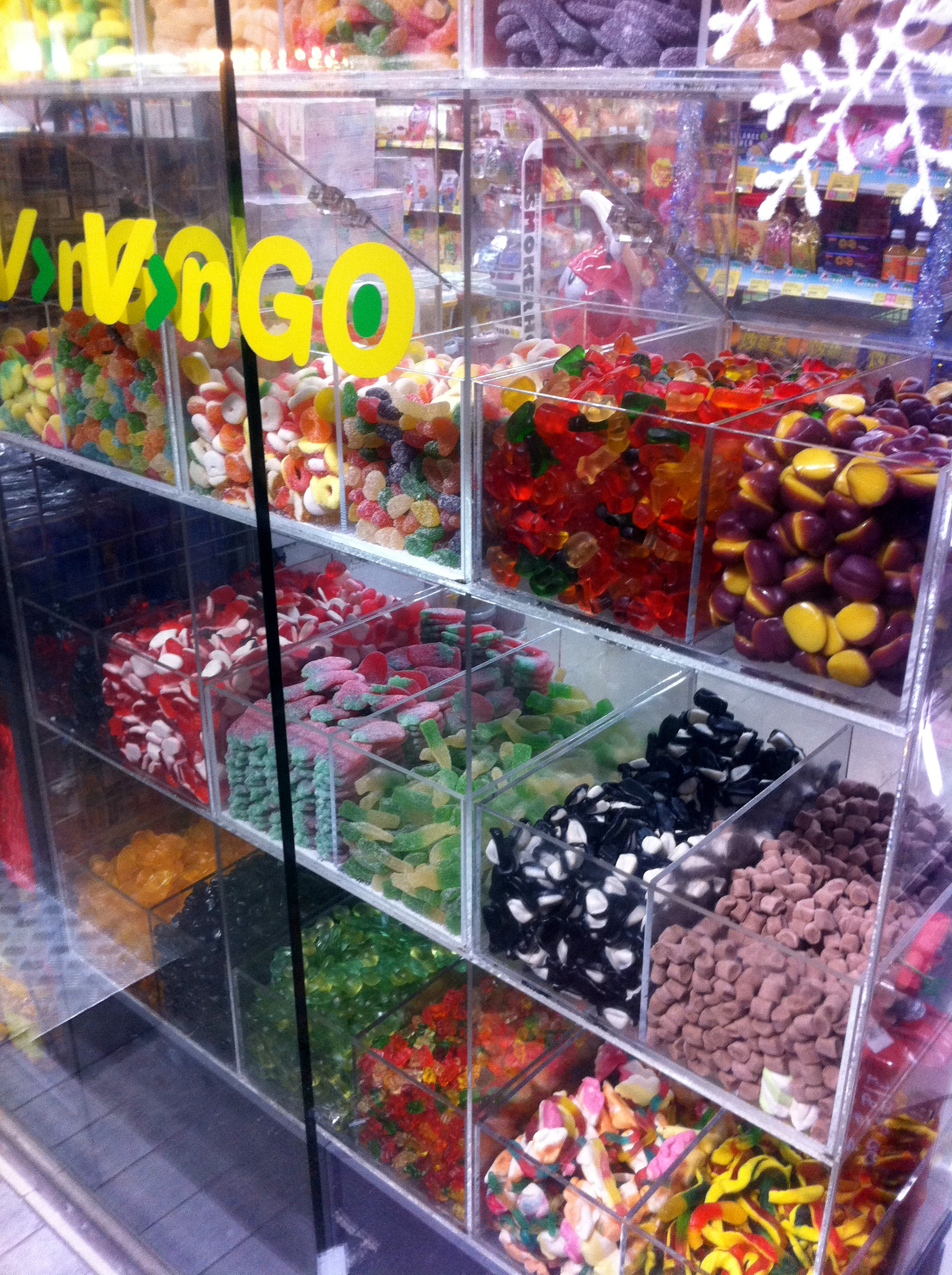
Bulk candies

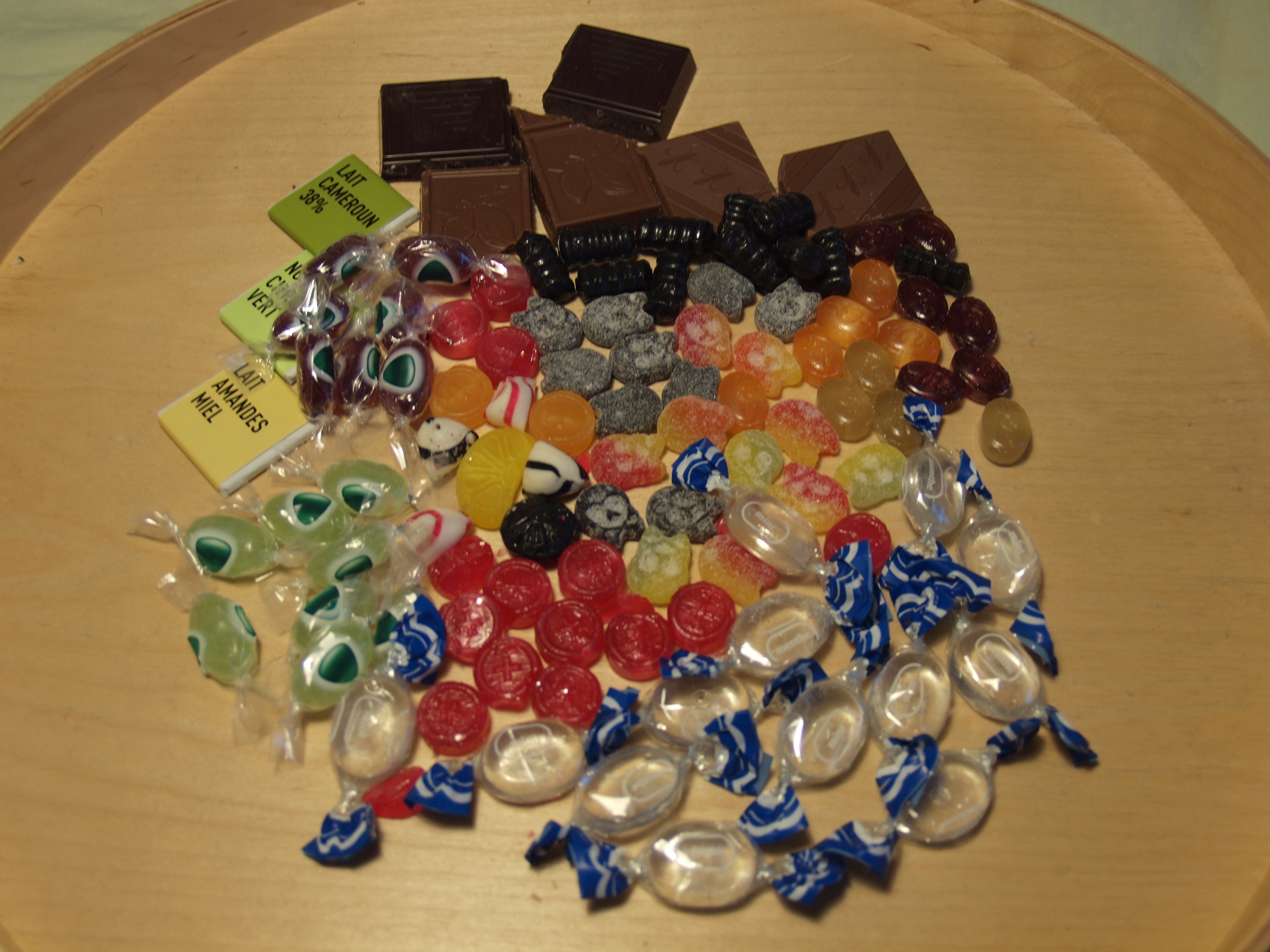
Various candies from Austria, Denmark, France and Sweden.

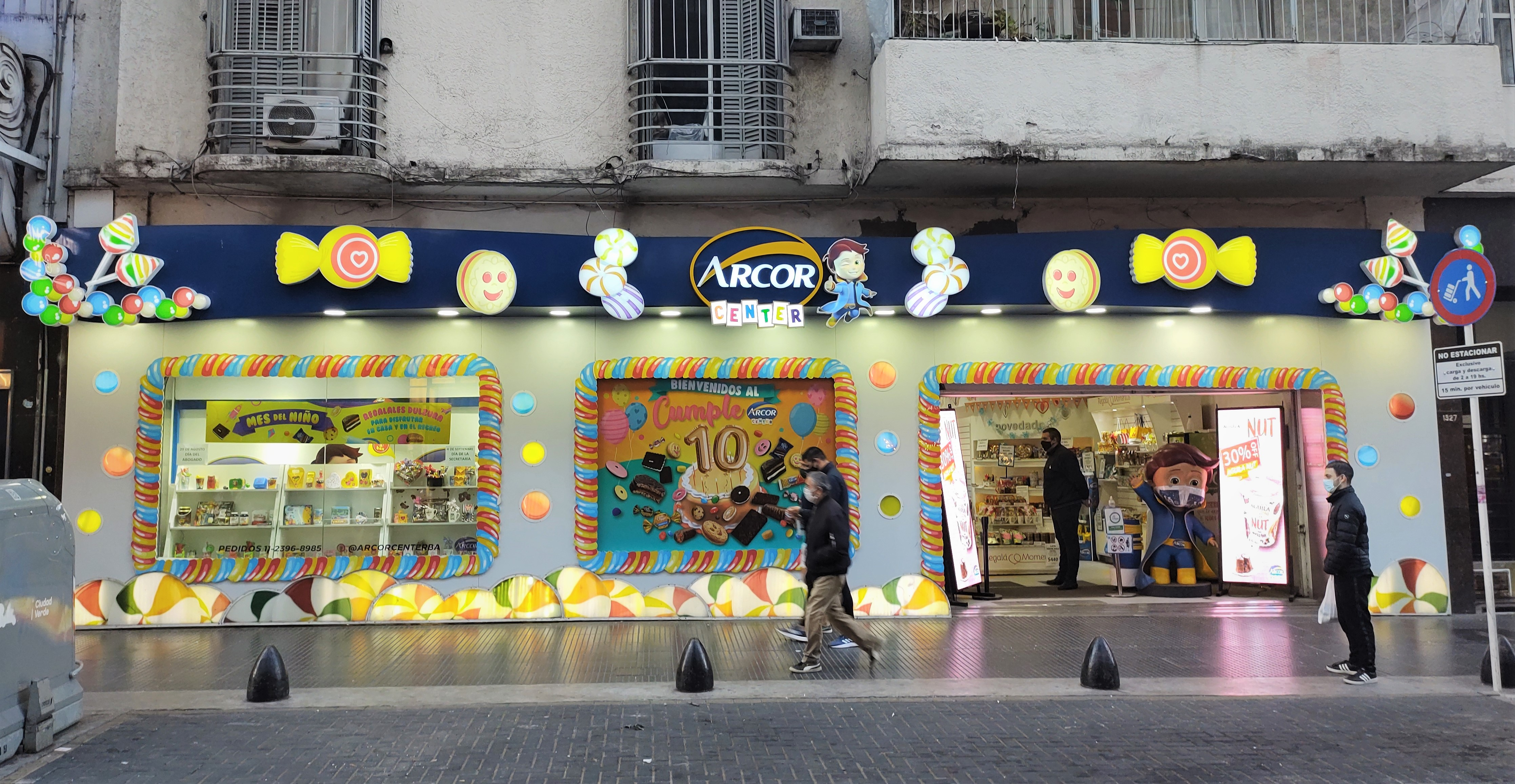
A candy shop in Buenos Aires, Argentina

== See also ==
- Candy apple
- Confectionery
- List of bean-to-bar chocolate manufacturers
- List of breath mints
- List of chewing gum brands
- List of chocolate bar brands
- List of confectionery brands
- List of desserts
- List of top-selling candy brands
- Piñata
- Traditional candies in Hong Kong
