= Nappo =

Nappo or NAPPO could refer to:

- Italian for a cup or bowl
- Nappo (chocolate), a German brand of chocolate
- Nappo (surname)
- North American Plant Protection Organization, an international organization
