= Zabala =

Zabala may refer to:

- Zabala (surname)
- Zabala (Sumer), a city of ancient Mesopotamia
- Zăbala, a commune in Covasna County, Romania
- Zabala fruit
- Zabala (candy), a brand of milk caramel from Uruguay

== See also ==
- Zaballa, a surname
