= Kongen af Danmark (confectionery) =

Hard candy with an aniseed flavour

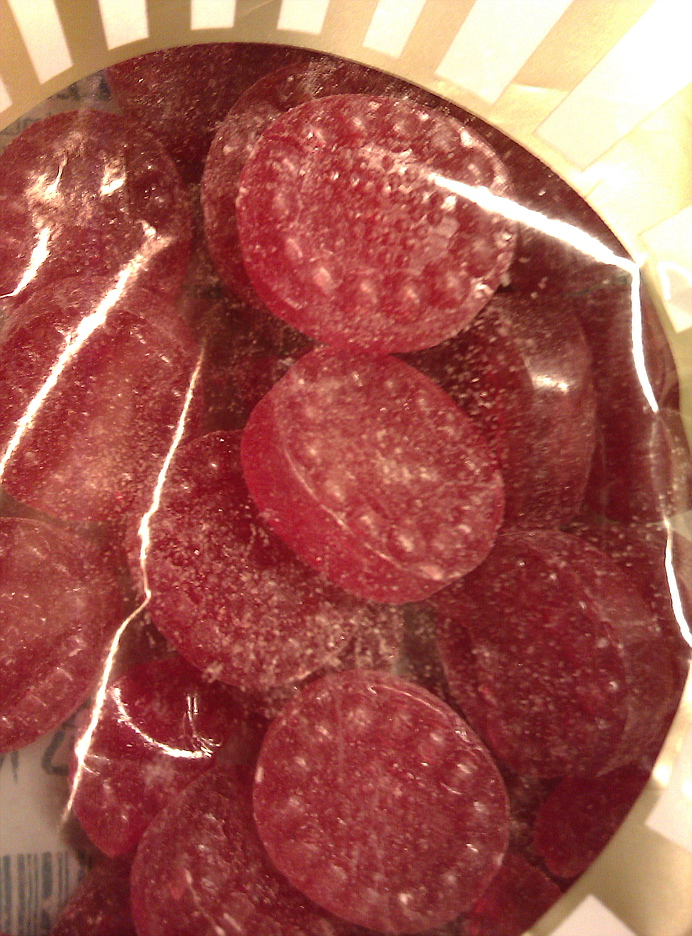
Kongen af Danmark candy.

Kongen af Danmark (transl. King of Denmark) is a type of hard candy with an aniseed flavour. The candy was previously eaten as a cure for cough and for general "chest pains".

The candy is marketed in Sweden by Karamellpojkarna as "Kungen av Danmark". The candies are hard, deep red or purple in colour and classified as cough drops. They are sold in regular and sugar-free versions.

== History ==
According to history, King Christian V of Denmark (1646-1699) had throat pains and was given aniseed oil by his doctor, as was the case with throat pains at the time. The king thought raw aniseed oil tasted too strong, so the doctor blended it with sugar and a small amount of beetroot juice.

The medication first became popular in Sweden, where it was sold as a syrup under the name "Kungen av Danmarks bröstelixir," (lit. 'the king of Denmark's chest elixir'). Later, confectioners devised a throat lozenge form. The candy was known in Sweden as "Kungens av Danmark bröstkarameller" (lit. 'the king of Denmark's chest sweets') which was later changed to "Kungen av Danmarks bröstkarameller", which is even today mentioned when teaching the grammar of the Swedish language.

== See also ==
- List of candies
