= Zaballa =

Zaballa is a surname. Notable people with the surname include:

- Constantino Zaballa (born 1978), Spanish cyclist
- Pedro Zaballa (1938-1997), Spanish footballer

== See also ==
- Zabala (disambiguation)
