= Mantecol =

Argentinian dessert

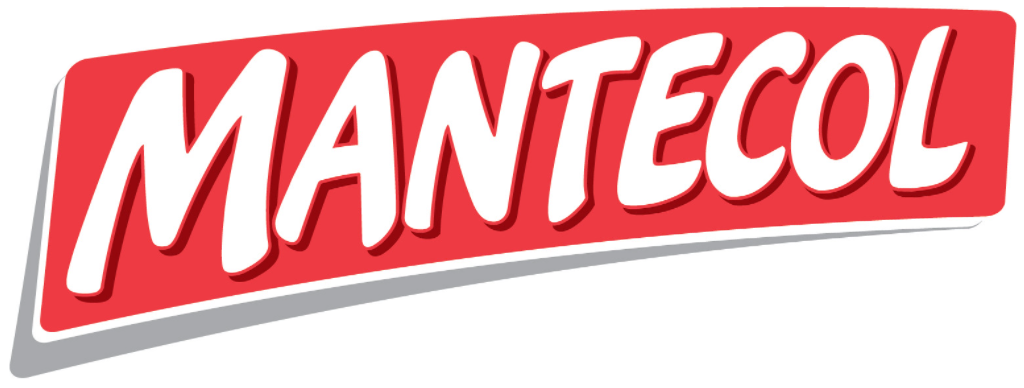

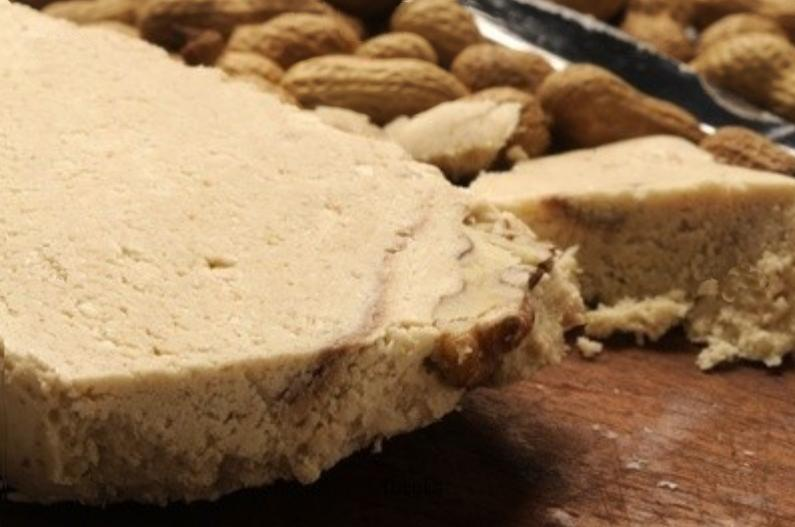
- Product type: Dessert
- Current owner: Georgalos (2022–)
- Country: Argentina
- Introduced: 1940; 86 years ago
- Previous owners: Georgalos (1940–2001); Cadbury (2001–10); Kraft Foods Inc. (2010–12); Mondelez International (2012–22)

Mantecol is the brand name of a typical dessert of the cuisine of Argentina, a sort of semi-soft nougat made from peanut butter. It was originally created and marketed in the 1940s by the confectionery company Georgalos, founded by a Greek immigrant, Miguel Georgalos, who took inspiration from a dessert in Greek cuisine, halva.

Mantecol is very popular in Argentina, where it is used as daily candy (especially between the months of December and February), as well as classic dessert of the Christmas table.

== History ==
Roots of the dessert can be traced to 1882 in Istanbul, where Juan Georgalos elaborated bread and traded cereals. His son Miguel was expelled (like many other Greeks) from Istanbul in 1921 after a Turkish Government decree. Miguel relocated to Poland where he had family. Those people manufactured and sold halva and taught Miguel Georgalos how to prepare it.

Before World War II started, Georgalos emigrated to Argentina. He opened a factory in Floresta, Buenos Aires, in 1941, on the same land where the former All Boys venue was located. Miguel named his business La Greco Argentina ("The Greek-Argentine"), being renamed to "Georgalos Hermanos" when the rest of the family arrived in the country. Miguel made some changes to the original halva recipe to suit the local customers' taste. As he was not able to find sesame in Argentina, he replaced it with peanuts.

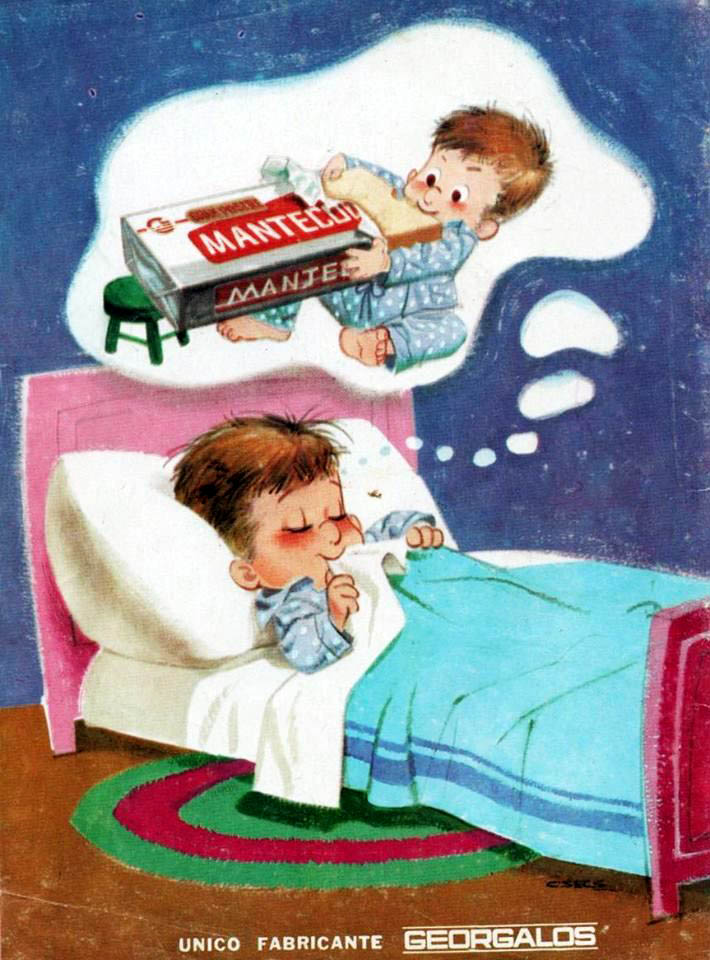
1969 advertisement for Mantecol

The name Mantecol came after a neighbor of Georgalos gave her opinion about the dessert, saying that it "tasted like butter" ("manteca" in Rioplatense Spanish).

At first, Mantecol was sold in 1 and 3 kg (2.2 and 6.6 lb) packages, but it was later sold in smaller packages.

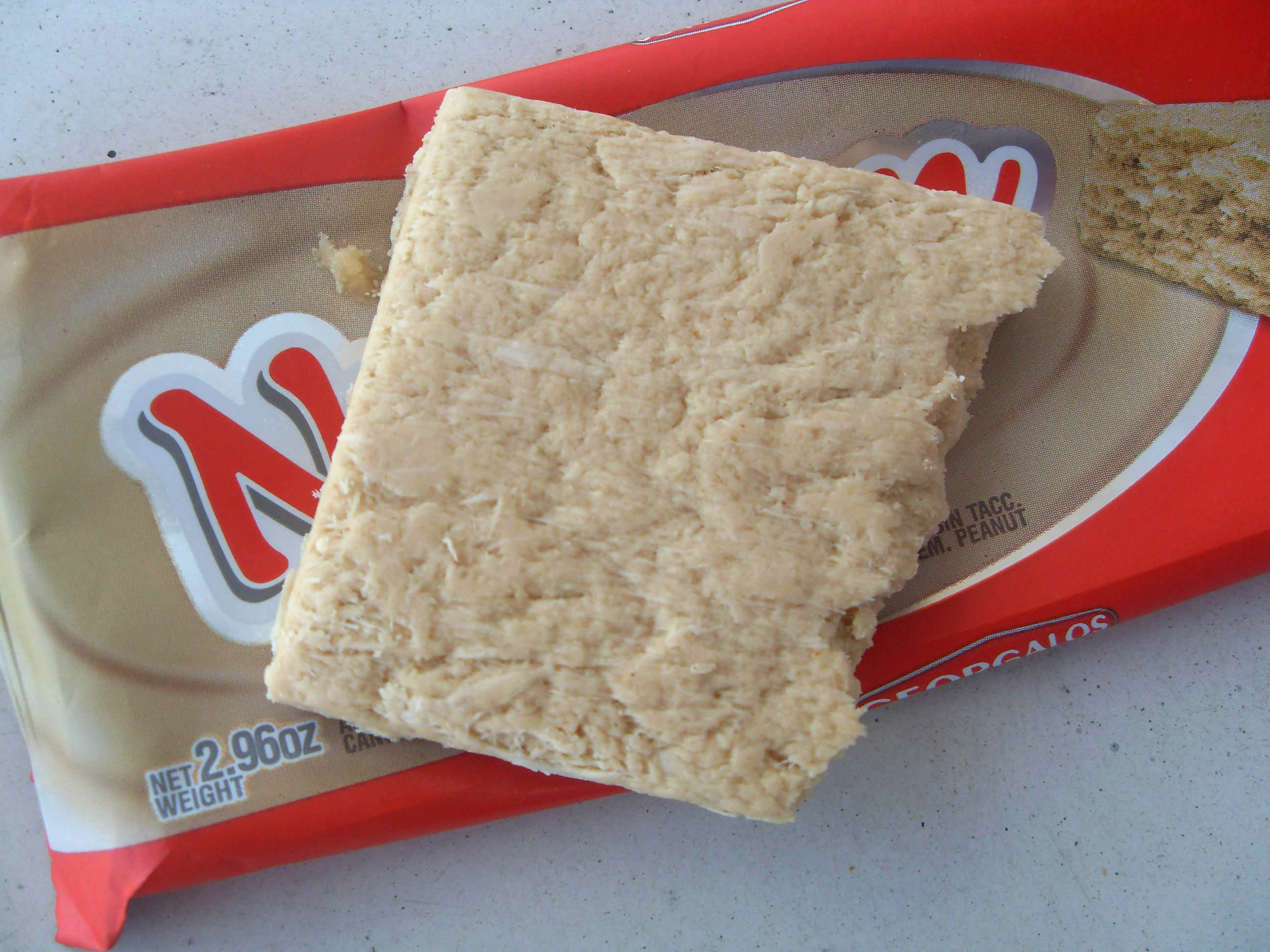
"Nucrem" was the brand name chosen by Georgalos after the company sold the Mantecol name to Cadbury

After the 1998–2002 Argentine great depression, the company sold the rights of the candy to Cadbury Stani (Argentine subsidiary of Cadbury Schweppes) for US$22.5 million which modified the recipe, adding glucose syrup, hydrogenated vegetable oil, egg-white, and vanilla. When US-based company Kraft Foods Inc. acquired Cadbury in 2010, Mantecol became one of its brands. Two years later, Kraft split its business into two new companies. One of them, Mondelez International, took over Cadbury and subsequently the Mantecol brand and products. Mantecol was manufactured by Mondelez at the Cadbury plant in Victoria, Buenos Aires.

However, when the "non-competition clause" expired in 2008, Georgalos begun, once again, production with the original recipe under the brand Nucrem. Three years after the launch, Georgalos possessed 30% of the confectionery market.

In July 2022, it was announced that Mondelez had sold part of its business in Argentina, with its plant in Victoria, Buenos Aires, being acquired by Georgalos. Therefore, Georgalos regained ownership of the Mantecol brand after 21 years, resuming production of the dessert and other products. With that operation, Georgalos also acquired other popular candy brands such as Bazooka, Palitos de la selva, Lengüetazo and Jirafa.

== Composition ==
The original recipe requires the following ingredients:

- Peanut Butter;
- Wheat flour 000;
- Semolina coarse;
- Whole nuts;
- Peanut paste;
- Dairy milk;
- Rosewater;
- Powdered sugar.

== Advertising ==
Since its inception, Mantecol was strongly advertised to promote the product. Georgalos joined forces with artist and animator Manuel García Ferré to make the advertisements. The company also launched several campaigns to promote Mantecol focusing on students, where the confection became popular.

== See also ==
- Halva
- Plumpy'nut
- Marzipan
