= Nucrem =

Argentine candy bar brand

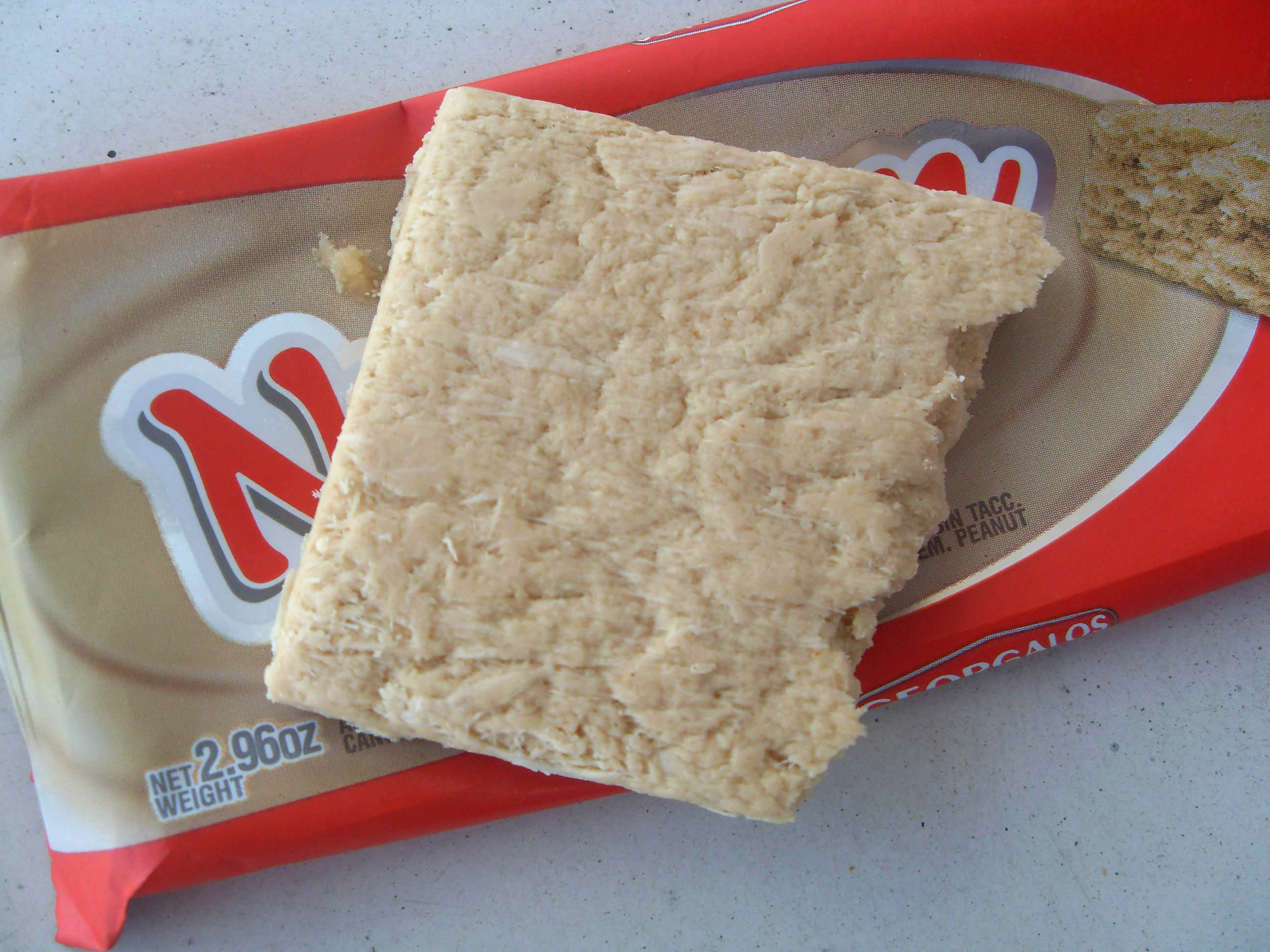
- Product type: Dessert
- Current owner: Georgalos
- Country: Argentina
- Introduced: 2009; 17 years ago

Nucrem is an Argentine candy bar, created in 2009 by the confectionery company Georgalos. It is a sweet peanut butter bar, derived from traditional Eastern Mediterranean and Near East known as halva.

== History ==
The company, founded in 1939 by Greek immigrant Miguel Nomikos Georgalos originally called La Greco-Argentina, was the original creator of the classic candy Mantecol, but it was forced to sell off the brand to Cadbury during the December 2001 crisis, through a leveraged buyout contract which included a clause that prohibited the manufacturing of similar products during a period of eight years.

Once the clause period finished, Georgalos launched “Nucrem”, claiming to use the original recipe for Mantecol, which was modified by Cadbury's. Unlike Mantecol, Nucrem claims to be composed by 0% trans fat, and a chocolate covered variety exists as well as a sugarless one.

According to packaging, Nucrem is composed mainly of peanut butter, honey and sunflower oil. It is certified as gluten-free and kosher.

In 2022 Georgalos re-acquired the "Mantecol" brand, however production of Nucrem continued with the original recipe while Mantecol maintained Cadbury's formula.
