= Tara Bosch =

Canadian businessperson

- Born: 1994 (age 31–32); Vancouver, British Columbia
- Education: University of British Columbia (dropped out)
- Occupation: Businesswoman

Tara Bosch (born 1994) is a Canadian businesswoman. She is the founder and former CEO of SmartSweets, a brand of low-sugar candy.

== Early life and education ==
Bosch was born in 1994. She grew up in Surrey, British Columbia. She attended the University of British Columbia as an arts student before dropping out in 2015 to focus on her business.

== Career ==
Bosch began experimenting with making low-sugar candy in 2014 using plant-based fibers and sweeteners.

Bed Bath & Beyond agreed to carry Bosch's gummy bears in Canadian stores and Bosch formed the company as "SmartSweets" in 2016. Bosch's company was selling its products in 700 stores across Canada, including Whole Foods Market by the end of 2016. In 2017, Bosch appeared on Dragon's Den, a Canadian reality television series similar to the U.S. series Shark Tank. Bosch began distributing her company's products in U.S. stores in 2018. In 2020, Bosch's company was acquired by TPG Capital for $360 million. Bosch, who had been the majority shareholder prior to the acquisition, remained a shareholder but stepped down as CEO of the company in 2020.

In 2023, Bosch founded a business incubator program for women entrepreneurs called "Bold Beginnings" that offers peer support and grant funding to women under 30.
