= Bêtise de Cambrai =

French boiled caramel sweet

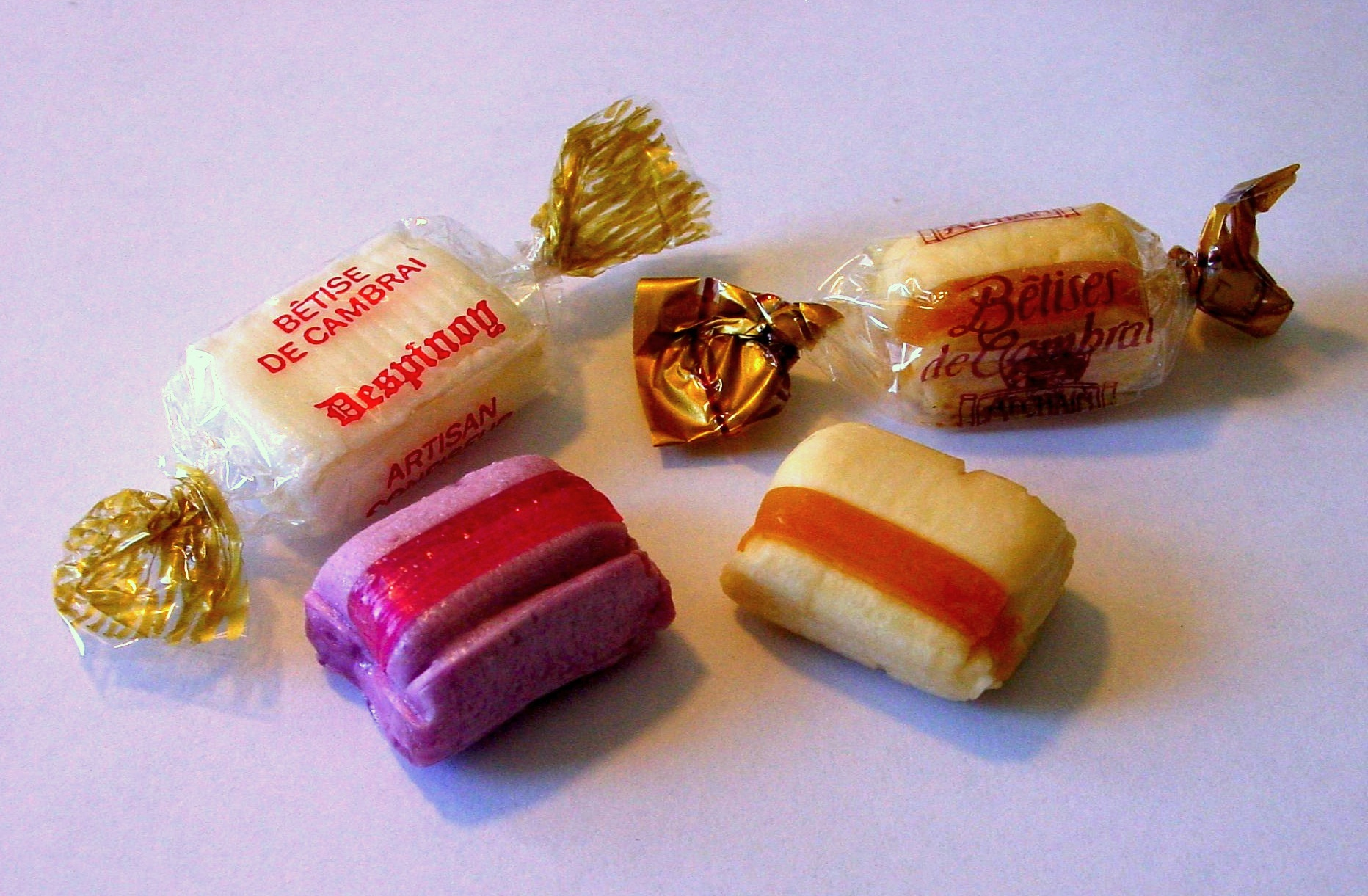
- Place of origin: France
- Region or state: Cambrai
- Main ingredients: Sugar; Glucose syrup; Mint

Bêtises de Cambrai ([betiz də kɑ̃bʁɛ]) are a French boiled sweet made in the town of Cambrai. "Bêtise" is French for "nonsense" or "stupid mistake" and the sweets are said to have been invented by accident. Two confectioners claim to be the original inventors: Afchain and Despinoy. The original flavour is mint, but many others are now produced. Stripes of caramel (made from sugar and glucose syrup) are added to sweeten the taste of the mint.

The original (metal) boxes sold by Afchain were emblazoned with the slogan "Non!...Mais goutez moi ça" ("Get a taste of this") along with "Afchain seul inventeur" ("Afchain sole inventor").

== See also ==
- Humbug (sweet)
- Cuisine and specialties of Nord-Pas-de-Calais
