= Vanparys Confiserie =

Belgian confectionery company

Vanparys Confiserie B.V.
- Industry: Confectionery
- Founded: Brussels, Belgium (1889)
- Headquarters: Avenue Léon Grosjean, Léon Grosjeanlaan, 90, B-1140 Brussels, Belgium
- Key people: Thibaut van Hövell (Chairman and CEO)
- Website: www.vanparys.com

Vanparys Confiserie B.V. is a Belgian confectionery company founded in 1769 by Felix Vanparys in Brussels, near Sablon, Belgium. The company produces chocolate and sugar-coated confections but specializes in dragées (sugar-coated chocolate and almonds), which features often in Christian and Islamic traditions and celebrations. The recipe and the preparation of its dragées, dates back over 125 years ago, and are still being continued today.

In 2012, Vanparys extended its selection of confections to include a range of chocolate-coated nuts, fruits, and coffee beans – as well as a variety of seasonal confectioneries such as praliné eggs and fondant chicks for Easter. Each season, Vanparys introduces a range of new colours to its palette.

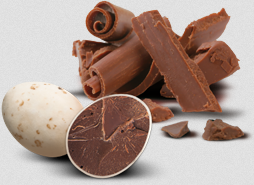
Vanparys Easter products

Presently, the company is located in Evere, Brussels, and exports to many countries including the Netherlands, France, Luxembourg, the UK, Germany, Poland, China, Turkey, Tunisia, Japan, and Portugal.

== History ==
=== 1889–1945: Early history ===
The Vanparys confectionery business was created in 1769 when Felix Vanparys founded a small enterprise in Brussels on Ernest Allard Street specializing in the production of sugar-coated chocolate and almonds, otherwise known as dragées.

In 1922, Emile Vanparys (Felix's nephew) took control and relocated the growing production line to larger premises in Brussels. He improved the coating technique while also making the sweets more accessible in price. When almonds grew scarce due to a bad harvest across Europe, Emile decided to replace them with an almond-shaped nugget of chocolate. This new type of dragée was eventually copied by the competition and has since become more popular across Europe than the traditional almond ones. By 1935, the Vanparys business had grown to 80 employees, but over the next few years production faltered due to the Second World War.

=== 1945–1998 ===
Progress resumed when the war ended. In 1945, Constant Vanparys took over the family business, and when its competitors had to stop producing dragées due to tough economic conditions, Vanparys recruited their staff. In 1957, Princess Grace of Monaco opted for yellow color dragées for the christening of her daughter Princess Caroline of Monaco, which led to the fact that colors other than blue, rose and white, came into vogue. Following that trend, Vanparys also expanded its range and introduced 25 additional colors the same year.

=== Modern history ===
In 1990, the Belgian confectioner André De Greef, together with his two sons, assumed control of the company, the first non-family members to do so. Under their stewardship, much of the factory, based in Evere, Brussels was renovated.

== Product range ==
=== Original collection ===
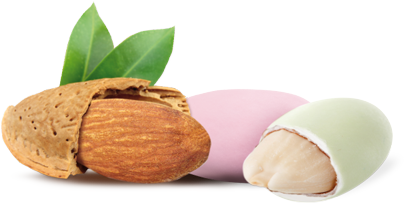
Vanparys Sweets

- Chocolate Dragées
- Almond Dragées
- Chocolate & Sweet Mini Dragées
- Gold & Silver

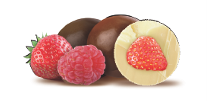
Gourmet Collection

=== Gourmet collection ===
- Chocolate Coated Whole Fruit
- Chocolate Coated Almonds and Hazelnuts
- Chocolate Coated Almonds with a Fruity Sugar Coating
- Coffee & Chocolate

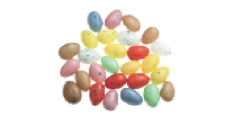
Cake Decorations

=== Cake Decorations ===
- Vanparys Mini Range (confettis, mini-confettis and mini hearts)
- Silver & Gold (gold and silver pastry and cake toppings)
- Fondant Jesus (sugar baby Jesus figurine)
- Fondant Hen
- Non Pareil (colourful, extra small mini pearls)

=== Easter Products ===
- Praliné Eggs (praliné eggs with a crunchy sugar coating)
