= Sport szelet =

Hungarian chocolate bar

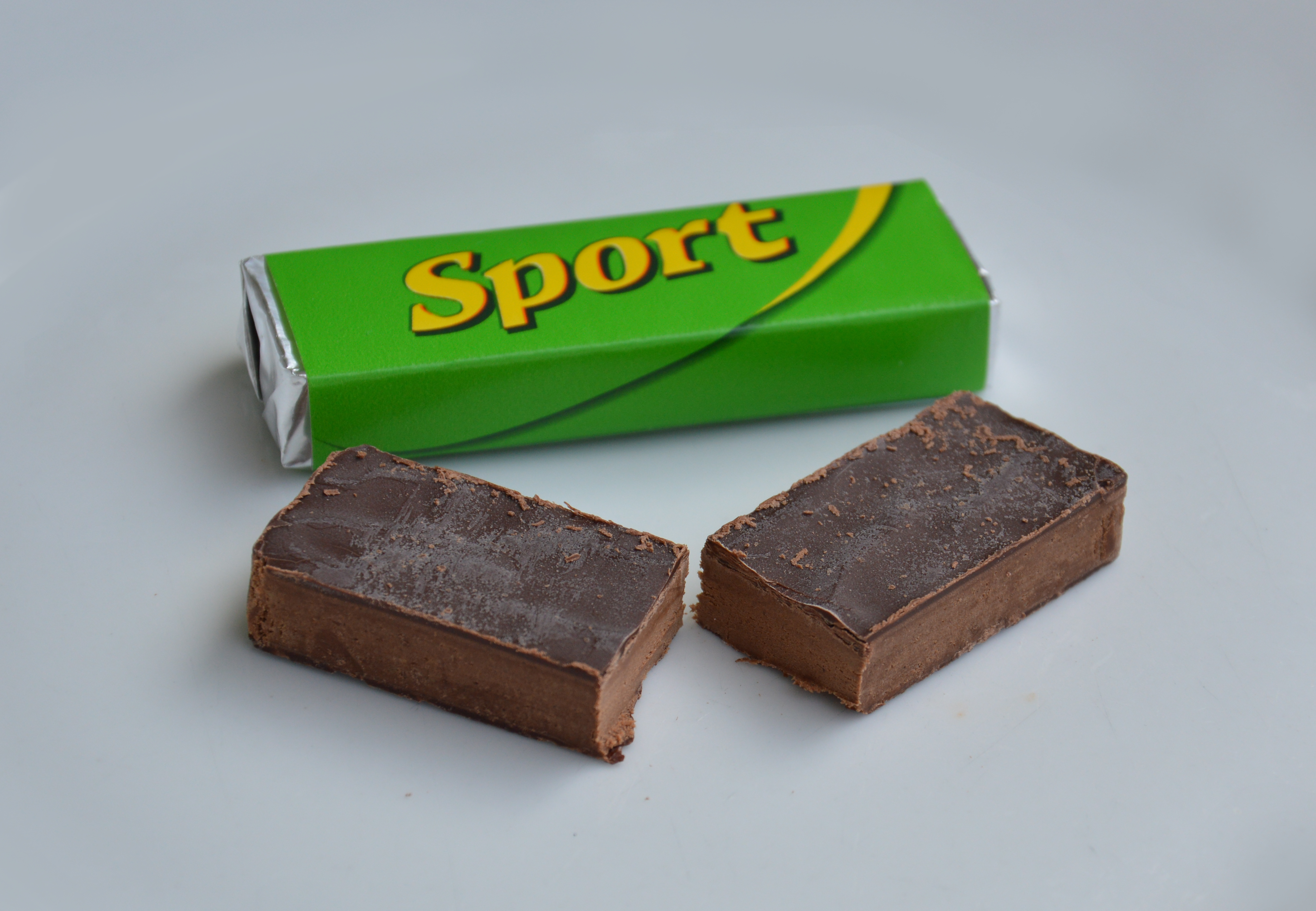
Sport chocolate

Sport szelet ("sport slice"), also called Sport csoki ("sport chocolate bar") is a rum-flavoured chocolate bar first produced in Hungary in 1953. The bar's slogan is "Az élet sport!", meaning "Life is Sport!". After the collapse of the socialist government in 1989, Kraft Foods bought the rights to Sport szelet and continued to produce the candy bar with its distinctive, half-century-old style of packaging until 2024, when flow-wrapping was introduced on environmental grounds. The modern bar has a weight of 31g. Alternative versions include the XL (42g), XXL/MAX (51g), and the DUO (60g).
