= Cuberdon =

Cone-shaped Belgian candy

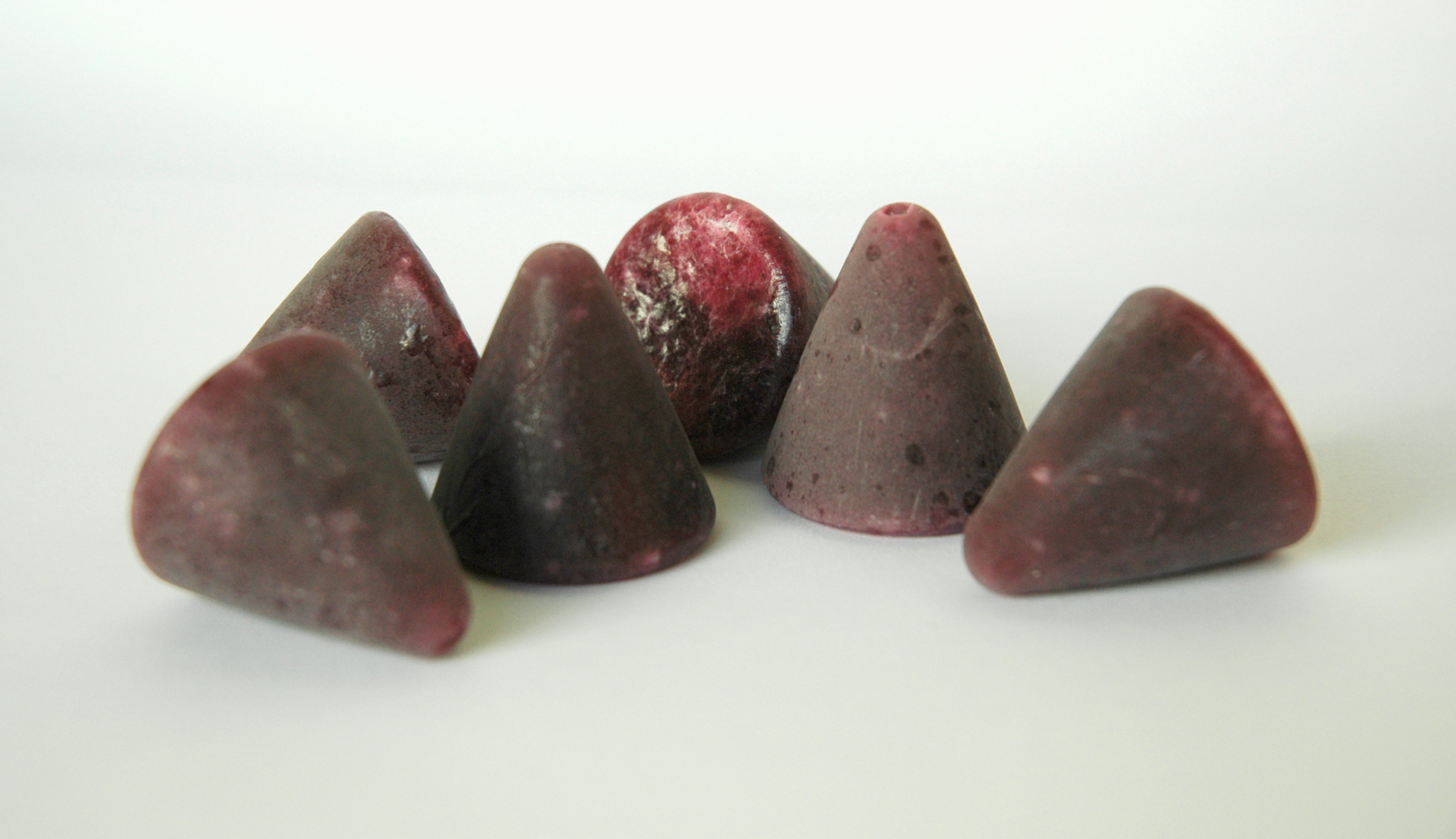
Cuberdons

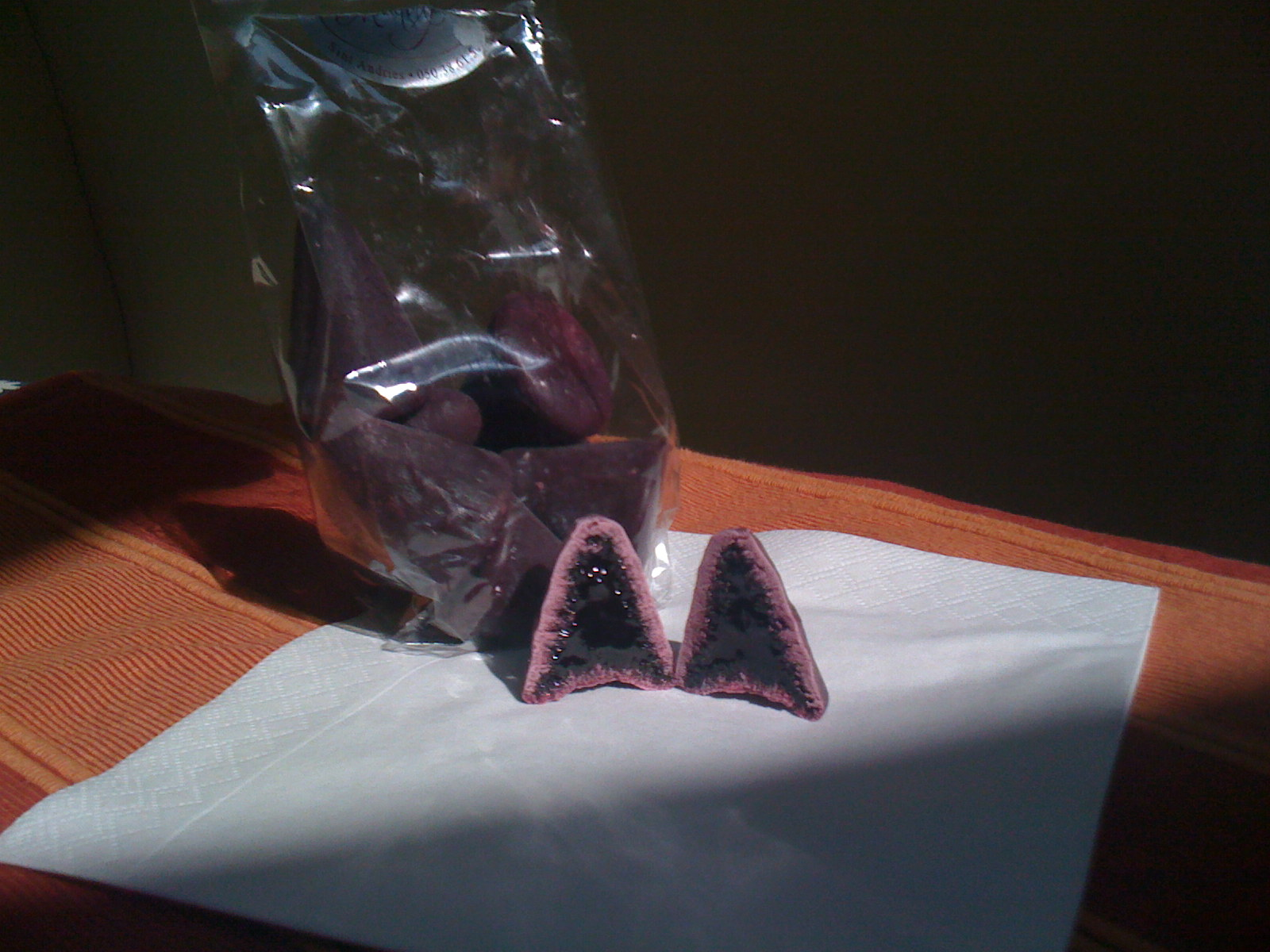
Cuberdon sliced in two vertically

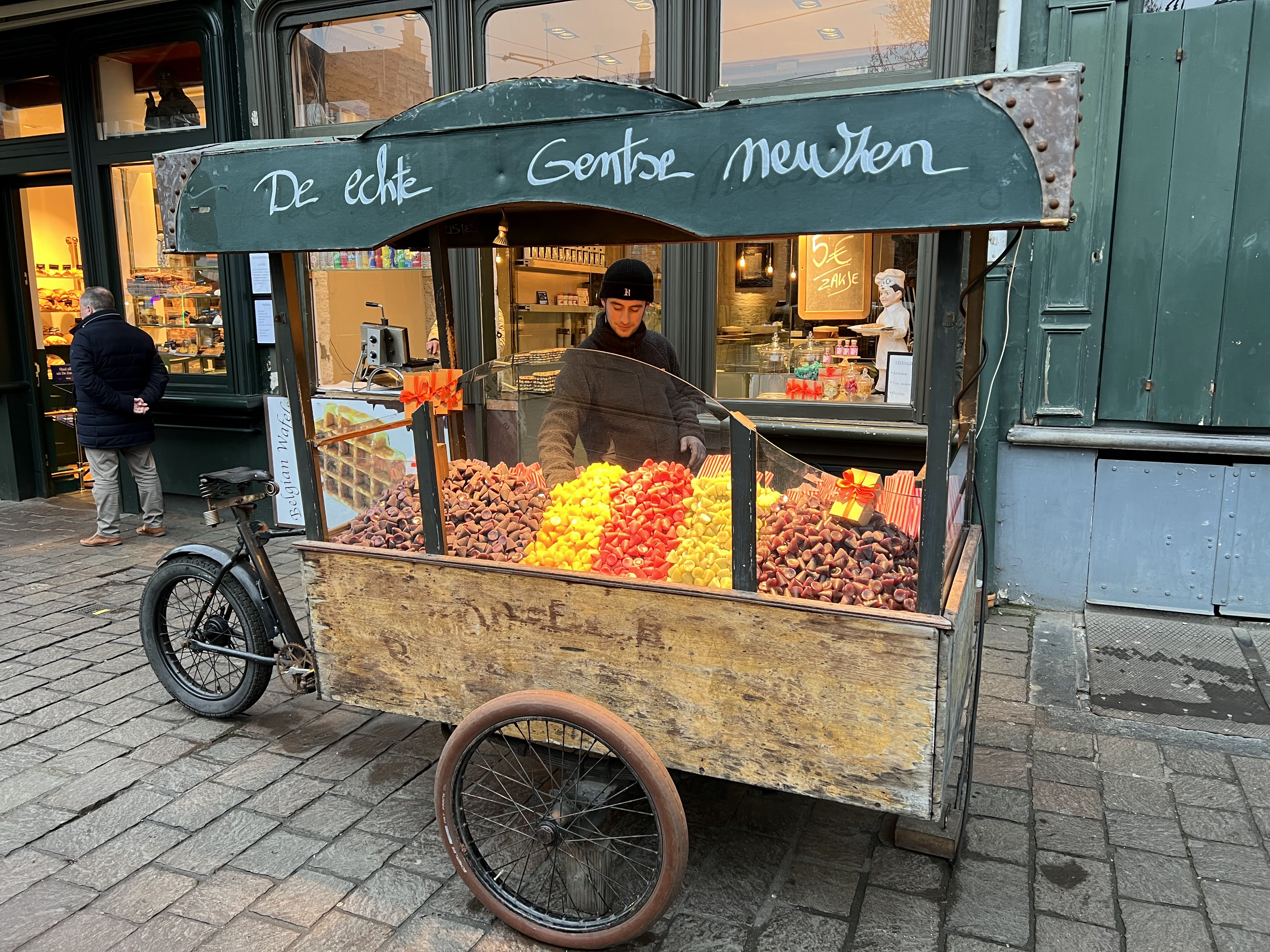
A cuberdon sales cart in Ghent

A cuberdon is a cone-shaped Belgian candy and a popular local delicacy in Ghent. In Dutch it is also known as a neus ("nose"), Gentse neus ("Ghent nose"), or neuzeke ("little nose") for its likeness to a human nose. In French, cuberdons are also called chapeau-de-curé and chapeau-de-prêtre (priest's hat).

Cuberdons are traditionally made with gum arabic candy crust with a soft, raspberry-flavored filling. Their color is purple, though more recently differently colored and flavoured variants have been available as well.

They are traditionally about 2.5 cm (1 inch) wide and weigh approximately 10 to 18 grams (0.35 to 0.63 oz), although smaller versions are also produced. The outside is relatively hard, whereas the inside is gelatinous. In recent years, various derivative food products have been made, including cuberdon-flavored jenever, ice cream, dessert sauce, and cookies.

Cuberdons can only be preserved for about three weeks, after which period the inside begins to crystallize. This limited preservability is the reason why cuberdons are infrequently exported outside Belgium. The Vlaams Centrum voor Agro-en Visserijmarketing (VLAM), an agency of the Flemish Government, has recognized the cuberdon as an official regional product.

== Origin ==
There are two hypotheses about its origins:

- A clergy member living in the city of Bruges created it—which might explain other names in use for the cuberdon such as "cleric's cap" (bonnet de curé) and "young nun's belly-button" (boudenne de nonnette).
- In 1873, pharmacist De Vynck in the city of Ghent discovered the recipe of the cuberdon by chance. In order to increase the shelf life of drugs at the time, many were packaged in the form of syrup. When the pharmacist examined a failed preparation after a few days, he found that it had formed a crust, while the core was still liquid. From this discovery came the idea to use such a technique to manufacture candy.
