= Hard candy =

Form of sugar candy

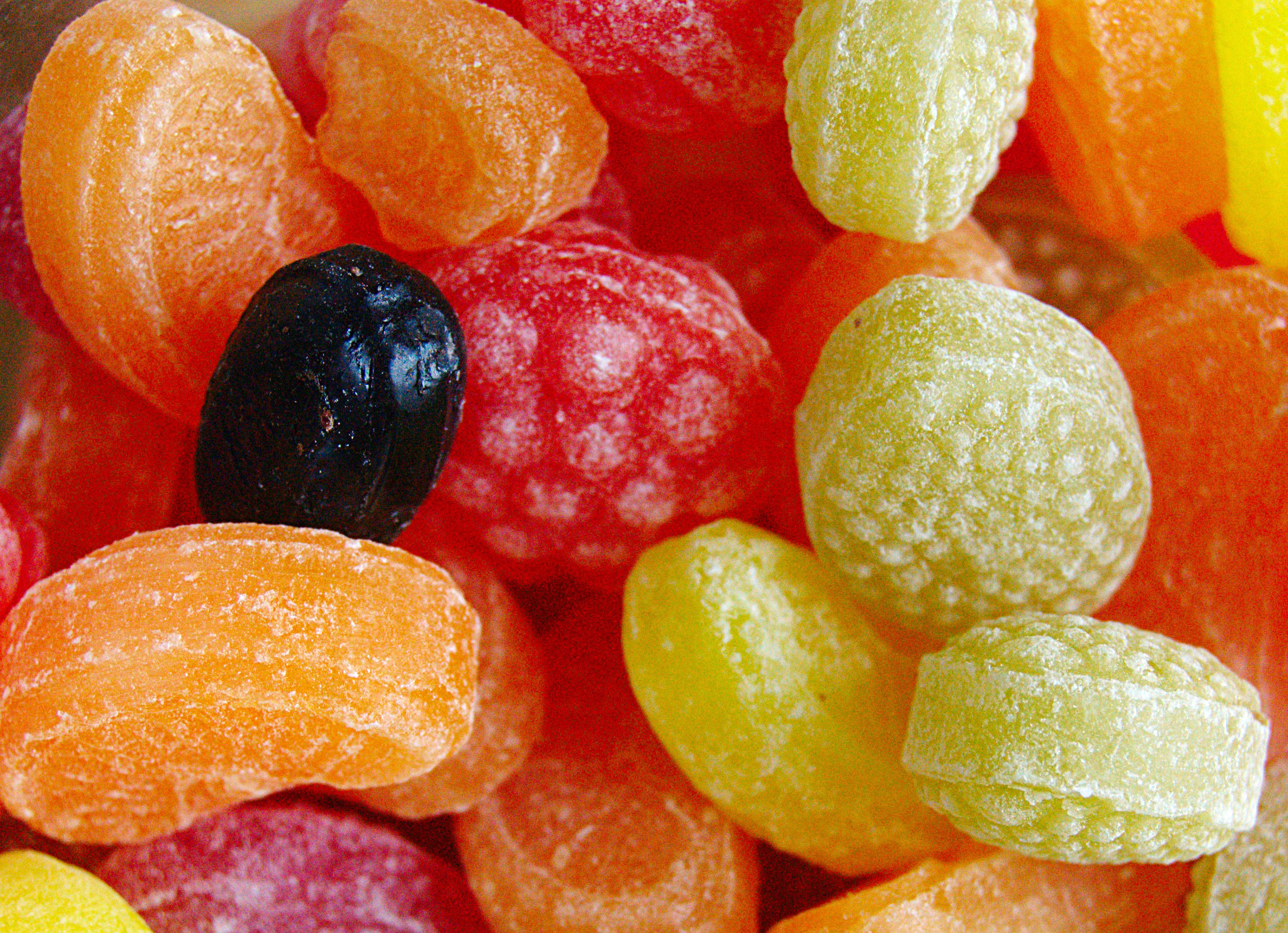
- Alternative names: Boiled sweet
- Type: Confectionery
- Main ingredients: Sugar syrup (sucrose, glucose, or fructose)
- Variations: Many such as candy cane or lollipop

A hard candy (American English), or boiled sweet (British English), is a sugar candy prepared from one or more sugar-based syrups that is heated to a temperature of 160 °C (320 °F) to make candy. Among the many hard candy varieties are stick candy such as the candy cane, lollipops, rock, aniseed twists, and bêtises de Cambrai.

Most hard candy is nearly 100% sugar by weight, with a tiny amount of other ingredients for color or flavor, and negligible water content in the final product. Recipes for hard candy may use syrups of sucrose, glucose, fructose or other sugars. Sugar-free versions have also been created.

== Creation ==
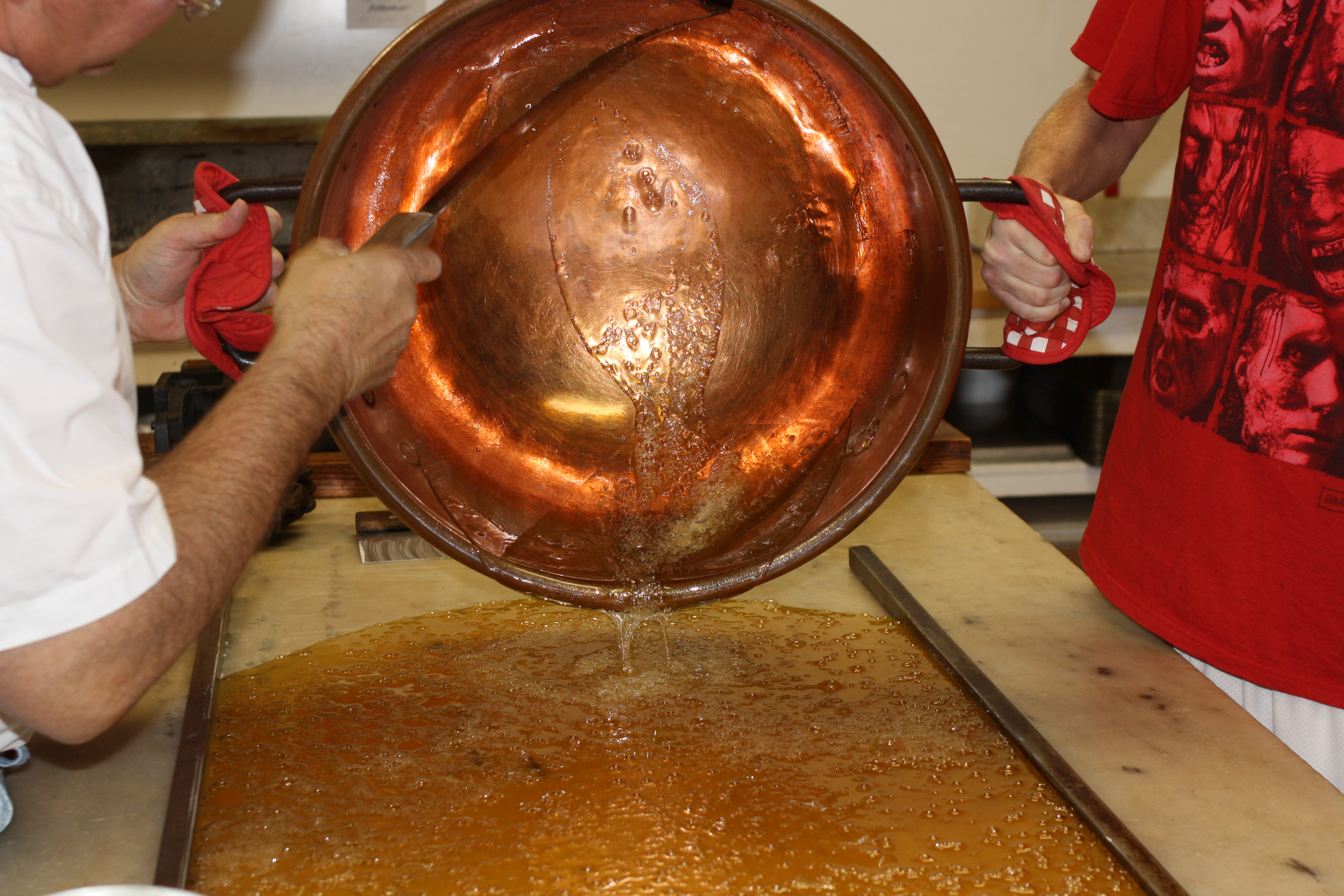
Heated syrup being poured onto a cooling table

Recipes for hard candy use a sugar syrup, such as sucrose, glucose or fructose. This is heated to a particular temperature, at which point the candy maker removes it from the heat source and may add citric acid, food dye, and some flavoring, such as a plant extract, essential oil, or flavourant. The syrup concoction, which is now very thick, can be poured into a mold or tray to cool, or a cooling table in case of industrial mass production. When the syrup is cool enough to handle, it can be folded, rolled, or molded into the shapes desired. After the boiled syrup cools, it is called hard candy, since it becomes stiff and brittle as it approaches room temperature.

== History ==
Hard candy can be traced back to ancient India, where sugarcane was boiled and consumed as khanda. Notably, the word khanda may be the etymological root for candy.

== Chemistry ==
Chemically, sugar candies are broadly divided into two groups: crystalline candies and amorphous candies. Crystalline candies are not as hard as crystals of the mineral variety, but derive their name and their texture from their microscopically organized sugar structure, formed through a process of crystallization, which makes them easy to bite or cut into. Amorphous candies have a disorganized molecular structure and do not have a grainy (rough or gritty) texture, so they may also be called ungrained. Hard candies are non-crystalline, amorphous candies containing about 98% (or more) solid sugar.

== Medicinal use ==
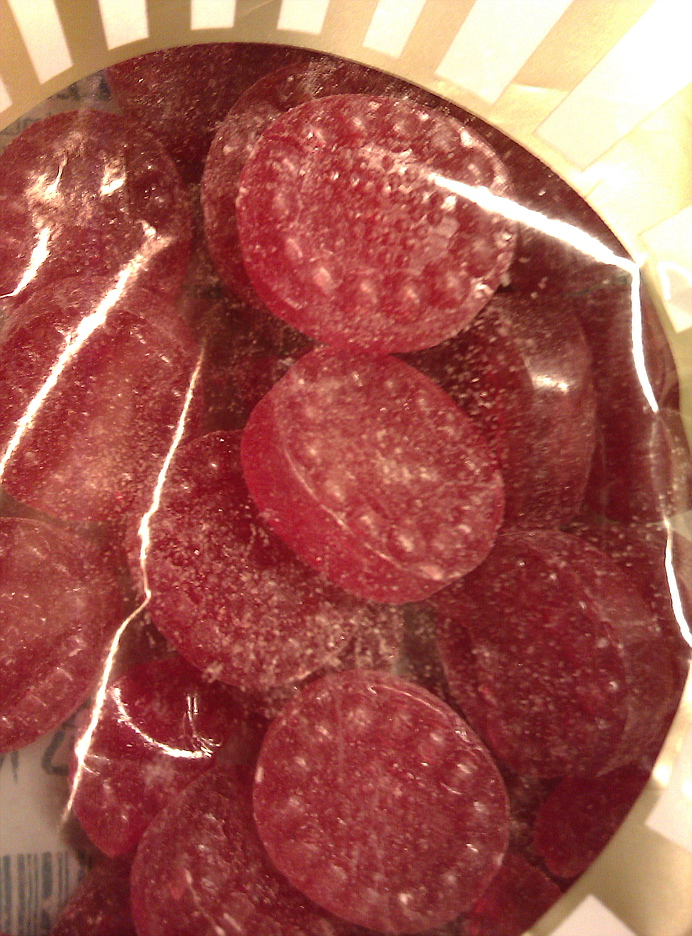
Kongen af Danmark ("King of Denmark") are Danish candies containing anise, sugar and beetroot juice. They were originally a medicinal candy, made for the king of Denmark who disliked the strong flavor of raw aniseed oil.

Hard candies are historically associated with cough drops. The extended flavor release of lozenge-type candy, which mirrors the properties of modern cough drops, had long been appreciated. Many apothecaries used sugar candy to make their prescriptions more palatable to their customers. They are also carried by people with hypoglycemia to quickly raise their low blood sugar level which, when untreated, can sometimes lead to fainting and other physical complications, and are used as part of diabetic management. In military emergency rations, they have occasionally been used due to their high caloric content relative to size.

== Sugar-free ==
Hard candies and throat lozenges prepared without sugar employ isomalt as a sugar substitute, and are sweetened further by the addition of an artificial sweetener, such as aspartame, sucralose, saccharin, or a sugar alcohol, such as xylitol.

== In Japan ==
Japanese hard candies are known as bekkō ame (鼈甲飴, lit: tortoiseshell candy). Common legends about the yōkai Kuchisake-onna say that she can be escaped by distracting her with bekkō ame.

== Names ==
Boiled sweet is a misnomer, as sucrose (a disaccharide) melts fully at approximately 186 °C. Further heating breaks it into glucose and fructose molecules before it can vaporize.

== See also ==
- Candy making
- Confectionery
- Gobstopper
- Humbug (sweet)
- Pear drop
- Mint (candy)
- Gumdrop
- Pastille
- Sherbet lemon
