= Hopje =

Type of Dutch sweets with a slight coffee and caramel flavour

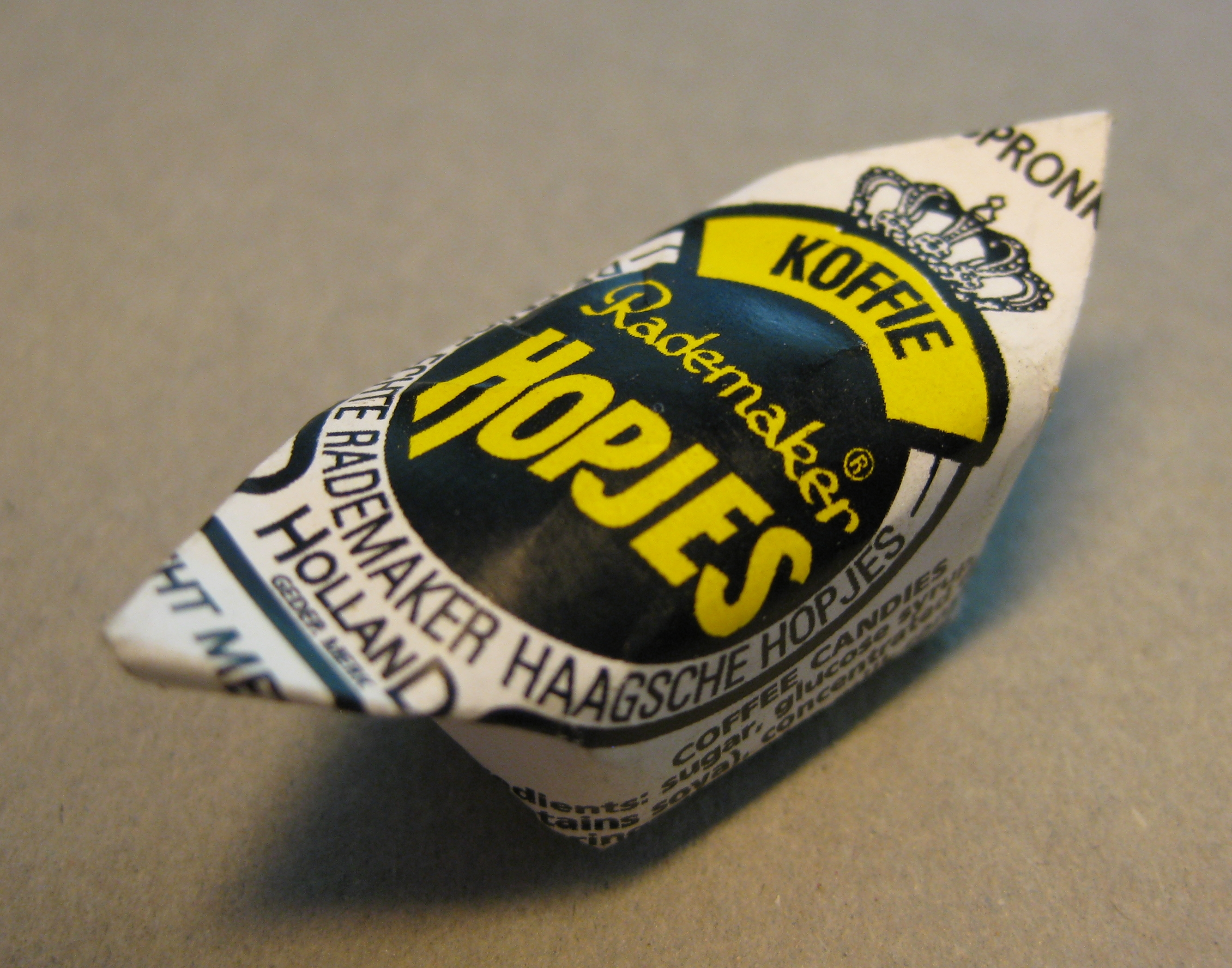
- Alternative names: Haagsche Hopjes
- Place of origin: Netherlands
- Main ingredients: Coffee, caramel, cream, butter

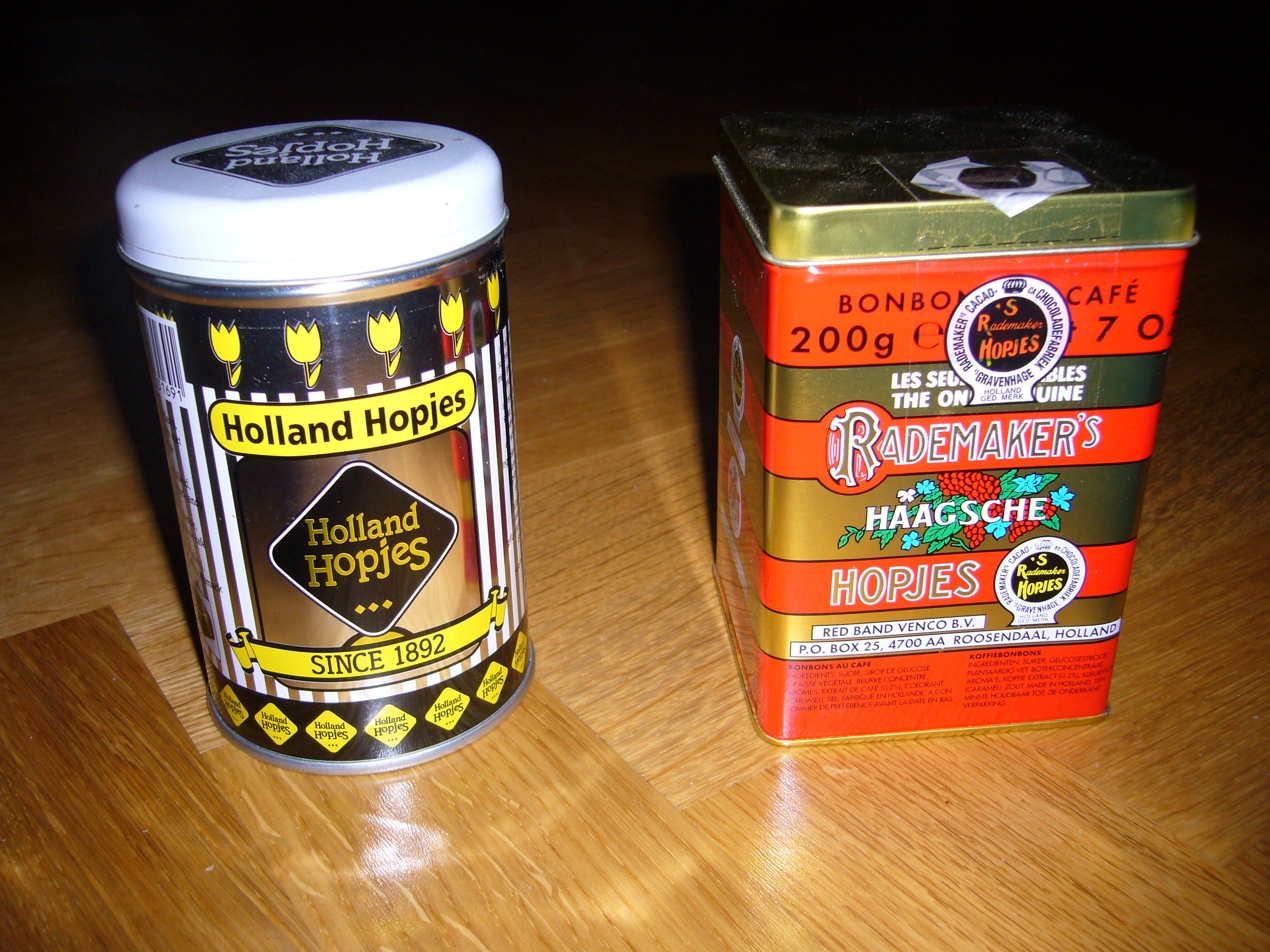
Two tins of hopjes

Hopjes (/ˈhɒpjəs/; also referred to as Haagsche Hopjes, hopjes from The Hague) are a type of Dutch sweets with a slight coffee and caramel flavour that originated in the 18th century.

The hopje is named after Baron Hendrik Hop (Breda, 27 October 1723 - The Hague, 29 April 1808) who was Envoy of the States of Holland in Brussels. When the French invaded Belgium and took Brussels in 1792 Hop was recalled to The Hague. He moved into rooms above the confectioners Van Haaren & Nieuwerkerk. He was addicted to coffee and the story goes that one night he left his coffee with sugar and cream on the heater, where it evaporated. On tasting the resulting substance, he loved it. His doctor advised him not to drink coffee so he asked the confectioner Theodorus van Haaren to make him some "lumps of coffee". After some experimenting, Van Haaren created a sweet made of coffee, caramel, cream and butter. The enthusiastic Baron Hop was keen to let his guests try his what were called 'Hopjes' up from 1880, which quickly gained popularity. Van Haaren's successor eventually even got orders from abroad.

This made the confectionery house famous far beyond its borders. Exports went to royal houses in Europe and to the tsars in Saint Petersburg. Special tins were produced starting in 1875 for the hopjes destined for the Dutch East Indies.

In 1794, the Nieuwerkerk firm purchased the adjacent house at number 94, and in addition to the shop, there was now also a tea and ice cream parlor; a new concept in The Hague that became very successful. Soon, more tea salons followed, such as Krul on the Noordeinde and Lensvelt Nicola on the Tournooiveld.

In 1924, the firm was converted into a limited liability company. The owner died a year later, and Nieuwerkerk & Zn NV associated itself with the Haagsche Beschuit Bakkerij. Hopjes were produced again, which were then called Geni-hopjes.

== Rademaker's Hopjes ==
A typical characteristic of the hopje is that it does not stick and that it does not go soft over time. J.P. Rademaker copied the hopjes and marketed them as "the only real Haagsche Hopjes". He was the first to wrap the individual sweets in printed paper, which was not usual at the time. Rademaker and Nieuwerkerk litigated for many years. When the Rotterdam company Rademaker took over Nieuwerkerk in 1949 the dispute continued between the two Rademaker companies for 40 years, until a 1989 ruling from the Dutch Advertising Code Committee ordered Rademaker to desist from using the term "the only real Haagsche Hopjes". Currently Rademaker Hopjes wrappers display the phrase "Alleen Echt Met Dit Merk" (Dutch: "Only Real With This Brand") instead.

From 1990 to 1998 The Hague had a museum called Museum voor het Haagsche Hopje, which was dedicated to the hopje and its history, located in the monumental building Oude Molstraat 30. The museum has since closed down.

Rademaker has been owned by RBV Leaf, part of the CSM group, since 1999.
