= Nappo (surname) =

Nappo is a surname. Notable people with the surname include:

- Greg Nappo (born 1988), American baseball pitcher
- Tony Nappo, Canadian actor
