= Supercoco =

Colombian coconut confectionery

Supercoco are a coconut candy from Colombia. The rectangular candy are packaged in green wrapping with yellow writing and are brown in color.
