= Fraise Tagada =

Type of candy

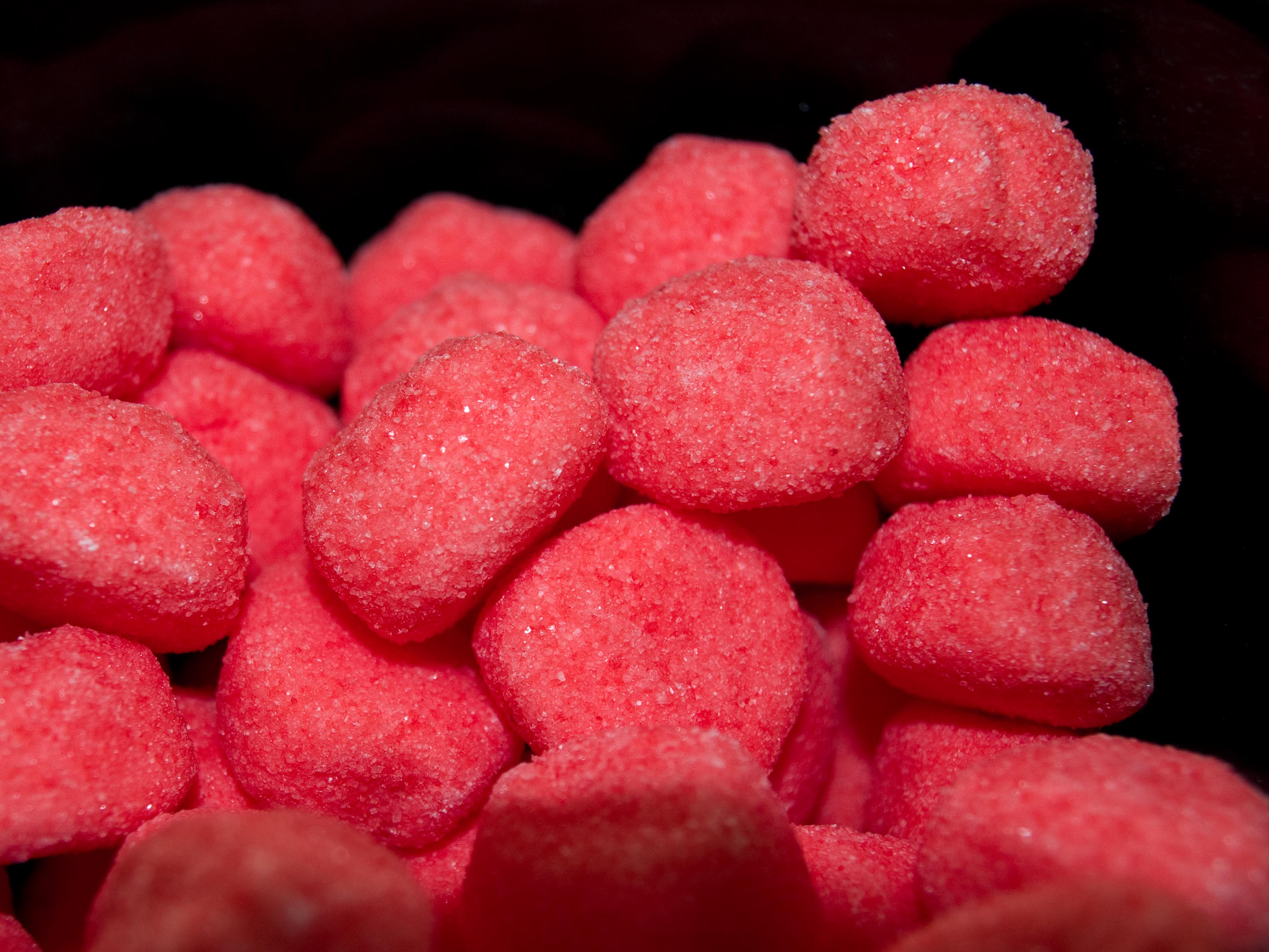
Fraise Tagada

The Fraise Tagada ("Tagada Strawberry") is a candy invented in 1969 by the Haribo Company. The Fraise Tagada is presented in the shape of an inflated strawberry covered in fine sugar, colored pink and scented.

The candy is made from sugar, glucose syrup, gelatin, citric acid, flavoring, curcumin (coloring), carmine, and mixed carotenes. There have, however, also been versions produced that do not contain curcumin.
