= Hopeatoffee =

Finnish brand of candy bar

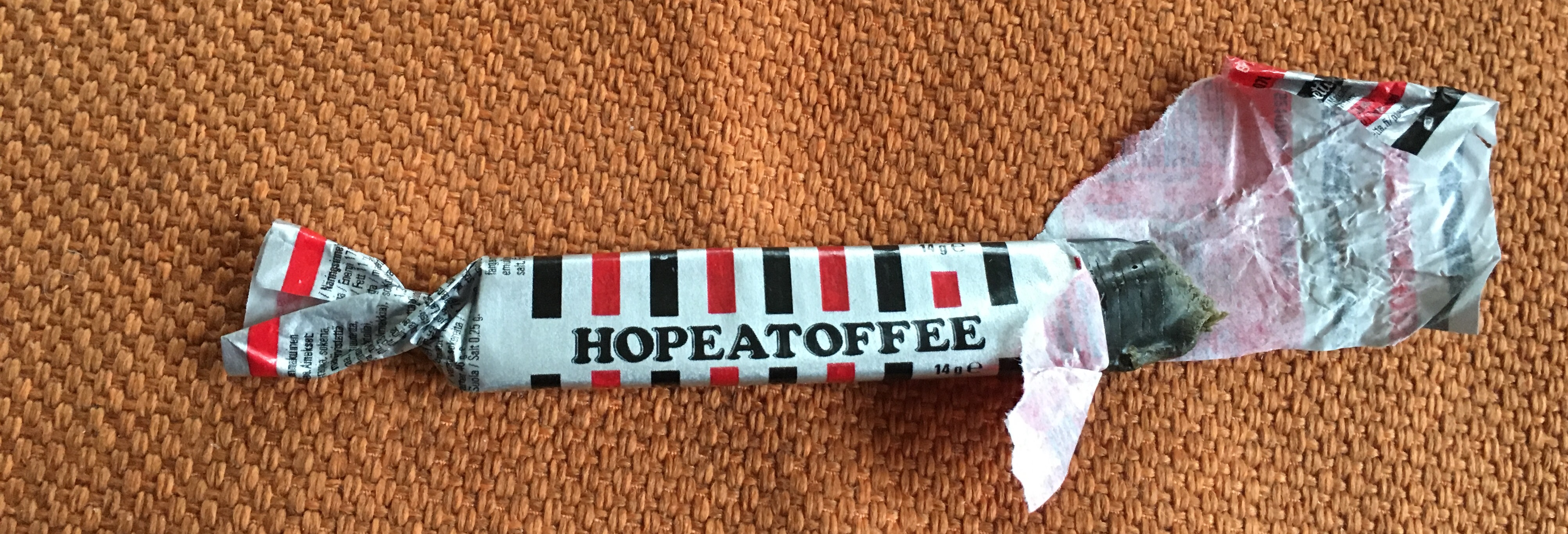
A Hopeatoffee candy bar.

Hopeatoffee (Finnish for "silver toffee") is a Finnish brand of candy bar, originally launched by Hellas, with a salty liquorice and toffee flavour. Production of Hopeatoffee started in the 1970s, and the candy was a new innovation at the time, as salty liquorice had not been combined with toffee before.

Hopeatoffee was later produced by Leaf International, which produced it until 2009. Because of great demand, Cloetta started producing the candy again in autumn 2013. Hopeatoffee was originally produced as candy bars, but it has later also been produced in candy bags. Nowadays Hopeatoffee is produced in Italy.

The Finnish Salty Liquorice Association awarded Hopeatoffee the Salmiakki Finlandia prize in 2008 as the best salty liquorice product of the year.
