= Poppamies =

Finnish food company

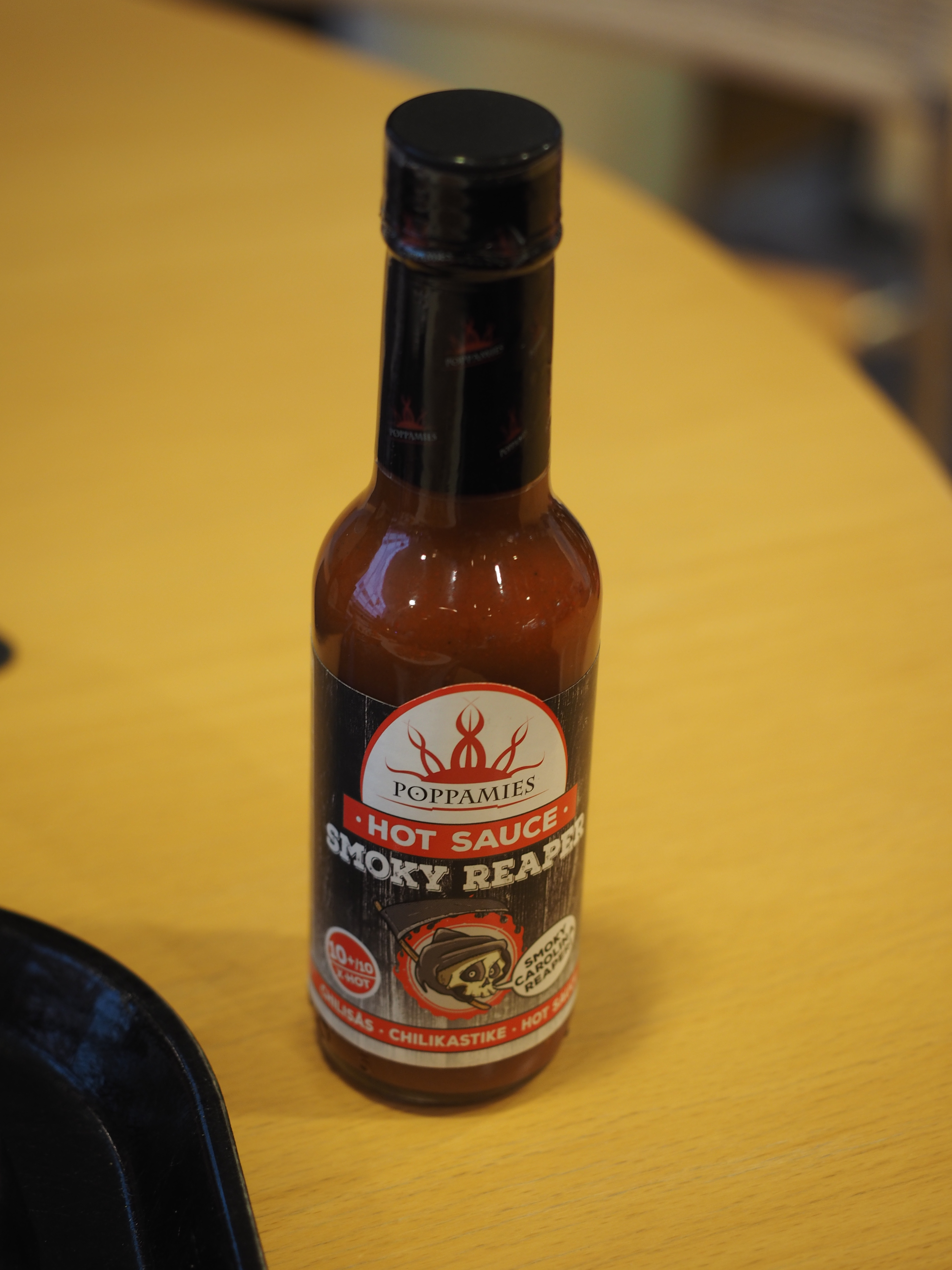
"Smoky Reaper" is one of Poppamies's hottest sauces, containing Carolina Reaper pepper.

Poppamies (Finnish for "medicine man") is a Finnish food company specialising in hot chili pepper products. The company was founded in 2008, and is headquartered in Kangasala (Pirkanmaa).

== History ==
Poppamies was founded in 2008 by Marko Suksi, who was working at Nokia at the time and founded the company as a side business because of his love for food and spices. In 2009, Suksi quit his job at Nokia to concentrate fully on his own company Poppamies. The company initially began as an online shop for imported hot sauces and spices, after Suksi and his co-founders identified a lack of spicy food products in Finland. Over time, Poppamies transitioned from selling imported goods to developing its own products, such as chili sauces and spice mixes, with Suksi playing a central role in recipe creation and product innovation.

In April 2025, Poppamies Oy was acquired by Saarioinen Oy, one of Finland's leading food companies. Following the acquisition, Poppamies continues to operate as an independent unit within Saarioinen's Taste Solutions business segment, maintaining its distinct name, brand identity, and recognizable product line.

The company has experienced steady growth; in 2025, Poppamies reported a turnover of 5.2 million euros and employs 13 people.

== Awards ==
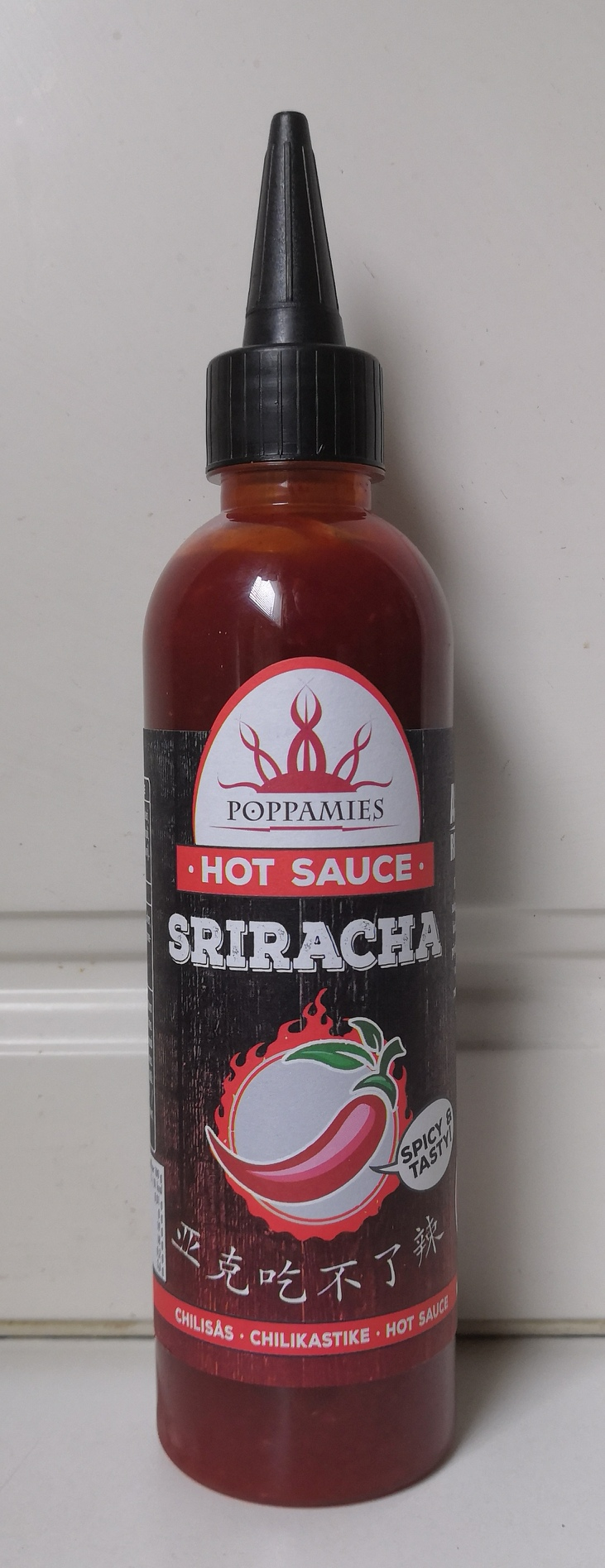
Award-winning Poppamies Sriracha sauce.

The company won the international Flavor Awards competition in the United States with its Cherry & Cola BBQ sauce in 2018.
