= Dracula Piller =

Danish salty liquorice

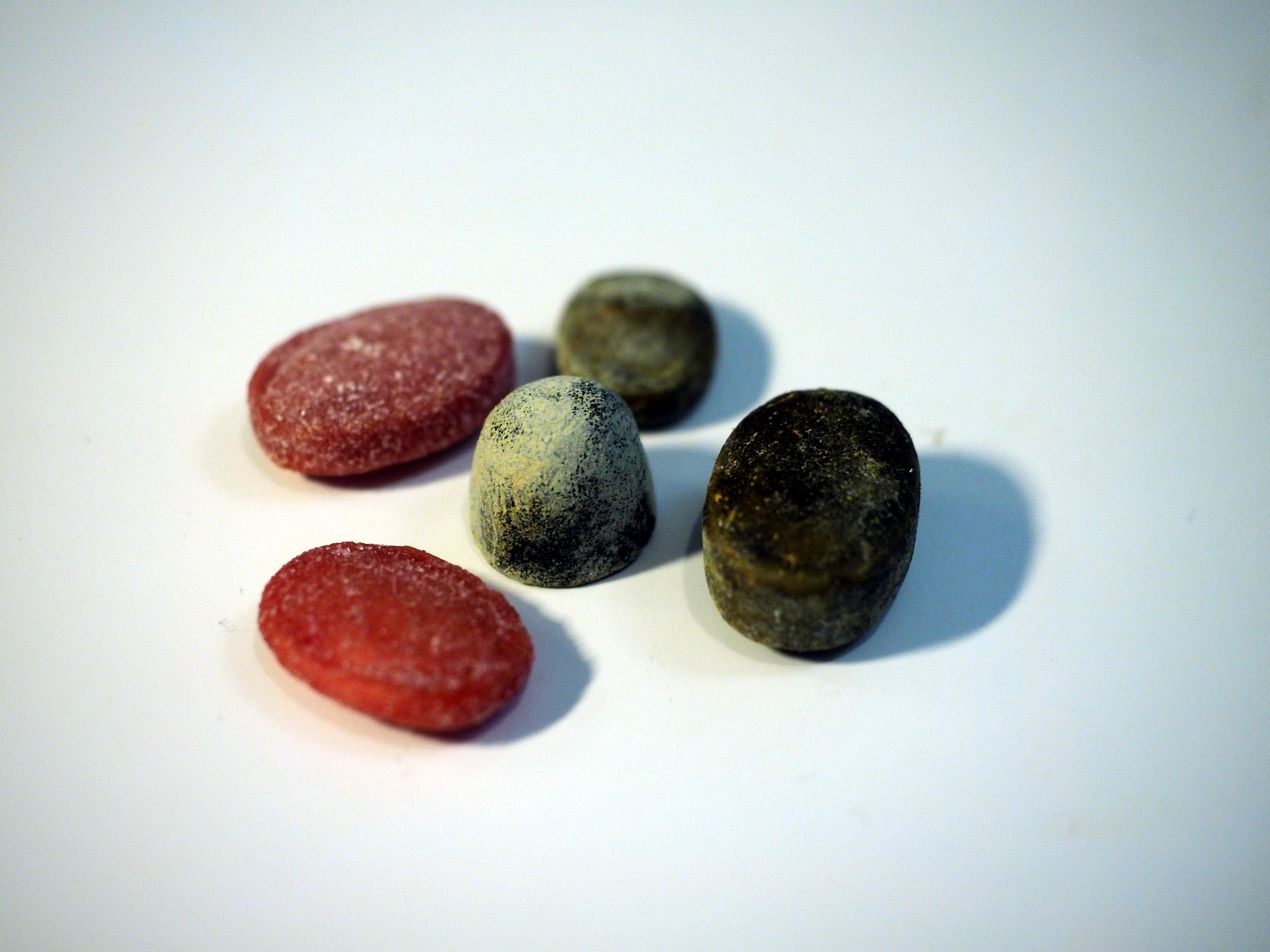
Dracula Piller candies.

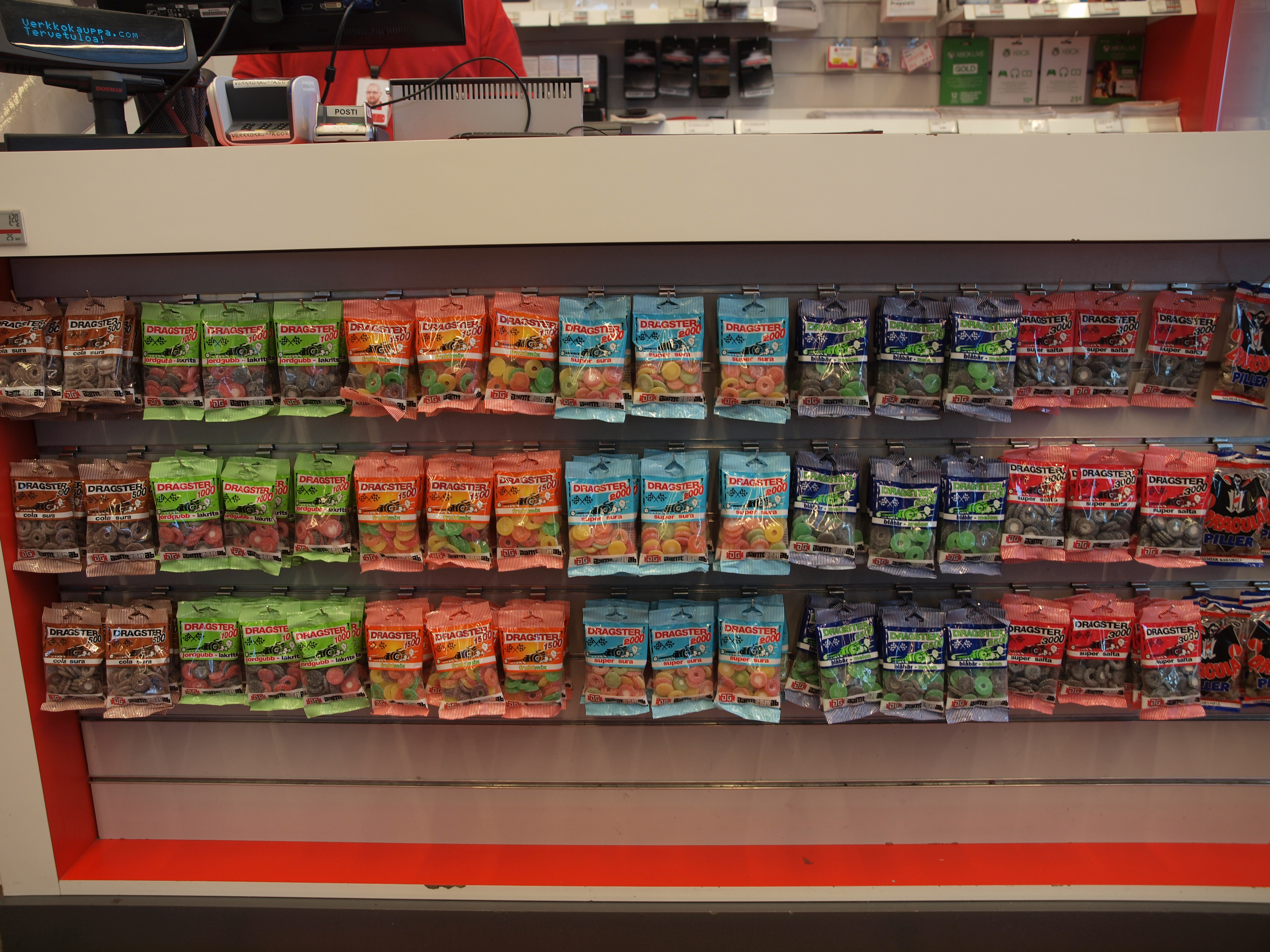
Dracula Piller candies (right)

Dracula Piller (English: Dracula Pills) are a brand of salmiakki confectionery. They are very popular in Denmark and Finland.

Dracula Piller are hard, roughly disc-shaped candies, with a salmiakki flavour. Unlike Turkish Pepper, Dracula Piller do not contain powder filling. The candies taste the strongest on the outside, biting into a Dracula Pille weakens its taste.

They were originally manufactured by NCI Nordisk Chokolade Import A/S in Denmark, and later by the Danish company which took over NCI in 2011: Scan Choco A/S.

The Dracula Piller bag features a picture of the famous fictional vampire Dracula, with his name written in big, red, blood-dripping letters.

The Danish bag no longer features the term "Dracula Piller", but they are still referred to as such in advertisements, on receipts, and in cultural consciousness.

"Dracula Piller" is plural; one piece of this candy is called a "Dracula Pille".

Related products from NCI and/or Scan Choco include Dracula Mega (a larger variety), Dracula Soft, Dracula Blod, Ghost (for the German market), Dracula powder and Dracula lollipops.

The book Salmiakki (2001) by Finnish author Jukka Annala describes Dracula Piller as a "classic hard salty liquorice candy". Dracula Piller were awarded the Salmiakki-Finlandia prize by the Finnish Salty Liquorice Association in 2002.
