= Nappo (chocolate) =

German confectionery

Nappo is a diamond-shaped German candy, chocolate-covered nougat, that has been produced since 1925. Nappo was originally produced in Krefeld by Dr. Helle & Co. GmbH, founded in 1920 as a manufacturer of peppermints.

The company was sold to Moritz in 1994, which was in turn bought out by WAWI chocolate AG in 2007, but the chocolate remains more-or-less the same, still sold in simple coloured foil wrappers.
