= Palitos de la selva =

Brand of candy

Palitos de la selva ("Jungle Sticks") is a brand of soft, chewy candy produced by Cadbury Stani Adams Argentina since the 1950s. It is one of the most popular and iconic confections in Argentina, and has also spread to Uruguay and Paraguay. In 2002 Georgalos bought Palitos de la Selva.

The candy is cylindrical, 6 cm in length and 1.5 cm in diameter, and weighs approximately 3 grams. It is divided along its length into white and pink halves, which are flavored vanilla and strawberry respectively. It is famous for its wrapper, the source of its name, which depicts an animal and gives a brief description. Recently, the wrappers have been turned into a game of skill similar to rock, paper, scissors, based on the habitat of the featured animal (Land, Water, or Air).

During the 1990s, a banana-vanilla version was introduced. In 2005, a "gigantic" version was launched, three times the size of the original, with a new grape-vanilla flavor combination.
