= Zabala (candy) =

Brand of confectionery

- Type: Milk caramel
- Place of origin: Uruguay
- Region or state: Fray Marcos, Florida Department
- Invented: 1913
- Main ingredients: Milk, sugar, artificial flavorings.
- Variations: mint, vanilla

Zabala is the branded name of a type of milk caramel candy or dulce de leche candy, traditional in Uruguay.

The name Zabala possibly comes after the founder of Montevideo, Bruno Mauricio de Zabala whose portrait is printed on the wrapper.

Zabala candies were invented in 1913 in the town of Fray Marcos in the Department of Florida and come in two flavors: vanilla and mint.

On 19 May 2015, production of Zabala candies was around 6000 and 8000 kilograms per month, the company celebrated its 90th anniversary a few months after the given date.

== History ==
In 1913, the first gristmill was established in Fray Marcos and improved the growth of the town. Soon after, the mill was bought by Agroindustrias Florida establishing the factory of the Zabala candies in the old mill of Fray Marcos.
