= Lemon stick =

Type of stick candy

Lemon sticks are a type of stick candy. They are similar to candy canes and peppermint sticks except lemon oil and acids are used for the flavoring. The coloring is typically a transuclent yellow body and white stripe.

Since 1942, Giambri's of Clementon, New Jersey, is one of the candy makers that produces them. They are not the same as a lemon peppermint stick, otherwise known as a Baltimore lemon stick.

== Baltimore lemon stick ==
In Baltimore, Maryland, part of the culture of Baltimore is a summer rite of passage associated with the Baltimore Flower Mart where Baltimore lemon sticks (also referred to as lemon peppermint sticks) are a treat in the form of a peppermint candy stick stuck in a lemon. Eaten together, they provide a sweet and sour taste sensation. The tradition may have come from France.

They are sold at the mid-spring Flower Mart held by the Women's Civic League. These simple 'drinks' are made by cutting the top off a small lemon, cutting a hole into the flesh, and placing a soft peppermint stick into it. Sucking on the stick and squeezing the lemon produces a sweet, minty, lemony drink. While mostly sold at Flower Mart, throughout summer, people in Baltimore will make these treats at home or social gatherings.

== See also ==
- Candy stick
- Polkagris
