= List of events in Baltimore =

Below is a list of events in Baltimore, Maryland, United States, which holds numerous annual events, by month.

== January ==
- Martin Luther King Jr. Day Parade

== February ==
- ClipperCon

== March ==
- Saint Patrick's Day Parade

== April ==
- Privateer Festival

== May ==
- Baltimore Flower Mart
- Maryland Film Festival
- Balticon
- Baltimore Comic-Con
- Kinetic sculpture race
- Preakness Stakes
- Sowebohemian Arts Festival
- Fire Hero Chili Cook-Off Outdoor Event Silent Auction

== June ==
- HonFest
- BronyCon
- Insubordination Fest

== July ==
- Artscape
- Otakon

== August ==
- Baltimore Pride

== September ==
- Fells Point Fun Festival
- Grand Prix of Baltimore
- Hampdenfest
- Baltimore Museum of Industry

== October ==
- Fells Point Halloween Festival

== November ==
- Greek Festival

== December ==
- Lighting of the Washington Monument
- Old Tyme Christmas Festival in Fells Point
- Hampden Christmas Parade
- Miracle on 34th Street
- Christmas Village in Baltimore
