= Giambri's Quality Sweets =

Giambri's is a historic candy shop and confectioner in Clementon, New Jersey. Italian born James Giambri immigrated to the U.S. in 1900 and opened the business in 1915 in Philadelphia with help from wife Mary and sister Giovanina. He retired in 1971 his nephew Anthony Giambri, Sr., took over, relocating the company to Collingswood, New Jersey before purchasing the current location in Clementon in 1972 with his wife Josephine and five sons, Anthony, Joe, Sal, Matt, and Dave. It was rebuilt after a fire in 1979 and a second story was added. Anthony died in 1980 leaving his wife and five sons to continue the business. Giambri's is now run by Dave Giambri, his wife Patty and three children: Brielle, Sammi, and David, along with other family and hired staff. Giambri's is especially known for its lemon sticks. Other traditional offerings include candy sticks, candy canes, chocolates, and "stem roses". in Philadelphia with help from wife Mary and sister Giovanina. He retired in 1971 his nephew Anthony Giambri, Sr., took over, relocating the company to Collingswood, New Jersey before purchasing the current location in Clementon in 1972 with his wife Josephine and five sons, Anthony, Joe, Sal, Matt, and Dave. It was rebuilt after a fire in 1979 and a second story was added. Anthony died in 1980 leaving his wife and five sons to continue the business. Giambri's is now run by Dave Giambri, his wife Patty and three children: Brielle, Sammi, and David, along with other family and hired staff. Giambri's is especially known for its lemon sticks. Other traditional offerings include candy sticks, candy canes, chocolates, and "stem roses". Giambri's candies and chocolates are sold at their retail store and by various retailers.

== History ==
- In 1999 Giambri's introduced gourmet Belgian chocolate covered pretzels and caramel filled waffles.
- In 2001, a bulk candy line was initiated.
- In 2014, Giambri's won the New Jersey Family Business of the Year Award.
