= Augusta T. Chissell =

American suffragist and civic leader

- Born: Augusta Theodosia Lewis; 1880; Baltimore, Maryland, United States
- Died: May 14, 1973 (aged 92–93)

Augusta Theodosia Lewis Chissell (1880 – May 14, 1973) was an American suffragist and civic leader in Baltimore, Maryland. Chissell was a leader in multiple community organizations, including as a founding member of the Baltimore branch of the NAACP. In 2019 she was inducted into the Maryland Women's Hall of Fame for her work in promoting women's rights and racial equity.

== Early life ==
Augusta "Gussie" Theodosia Lewis was born around the year 1880 in Baltimore. Her parents, William S. and Sarah S. Lewis, were both biracial. Augusta lived with her parents and worked as a milliner before marrying.

She married an influential African-American physician, Robert Garland Chissell, sometime between 1910 and 1920. She was also an accomplished pianist.

== Activism for suffrage and civil rights ==
Chissell lived in a three-story brick row house in northwest Baltimore, next door to Margaret Gregory Hawkins, her frequent collaborator. Along with fellow activist Estelle Young, Hawkins and Chissell dedicated their time to improving the lives of women and Black people in Baltimore, running meetings out of their living rooms.

Hawkins and Chissell formed the Dubois Circle, an African-American women's club, in 1907. The group grew out of the Niagara Movement, first focusing on studying literature and the arts, but soon expanded to political and civic activities. The officers of the Dubois Circle hosted political meetings at their homes and churches, strategically pushing their agenda to allow women to vote.

Chissell was one of the founding members of the Baltimore branch of the NAACP, serving as the first vice president of the organization upon its founding in 1912. She also served as the chair of the Women's Cooperative Civic League, a grassroots organization which addressed issues of housing and public health, including food purity, clean air, and refuse disposal.

Estelle Young formed the Progressive Women's Suffrage Club (also known as the Colored Women's Suffrage Club) in 1915; Hawkins served as the vice president and Chissell as the secretary.

After the 1920 ratification of the 19th Amendment, Chissell wrote a recurring column in the Baltimore Afro-American, A Primer for Women Voters, "for the benefit of women who wish to inform themselves in regard to their newly acquired duties and privileges as voters and citizens." Chissell responded to readers' questions about the process of voting and sometimes gave directions about which politicians and parties to vote for. Chissell organized weekly "Citizenship Meetings" for women voters through the Colored Young Women's Christian Association (CYWCA). The Progressive Women's Suffrage Club also taught voter education classes. Chissell and other African-American activists' work continued beyond ratification due to challenges in voting based on racial discrimination. Black people in the U.S. were routinely kept from voting by efforts such as poll taxes and literacy tests until the passage of the Voting Rights Act of 1965 and related court decisions.

In 1936, Chissell served as the president of the Women's Auxiliary of the Baltimore Urban League, launching an intensive effort to reach out to white women to interest them in Baltimore's interracial social justice issues.

Chissell continued her work through her leadership in the Cooperative Civic League into her eighties, chairing the committee that organized the annual Baltimore Flower Mart. She held multiple positions in the Baltimore branch of the NAACP throughout her life, including chairing the Special Gifts committee in 1935 and the Interracial Committee in 1941. Her service through the organization lasted until her death in 1973.

== Death and legacy ==
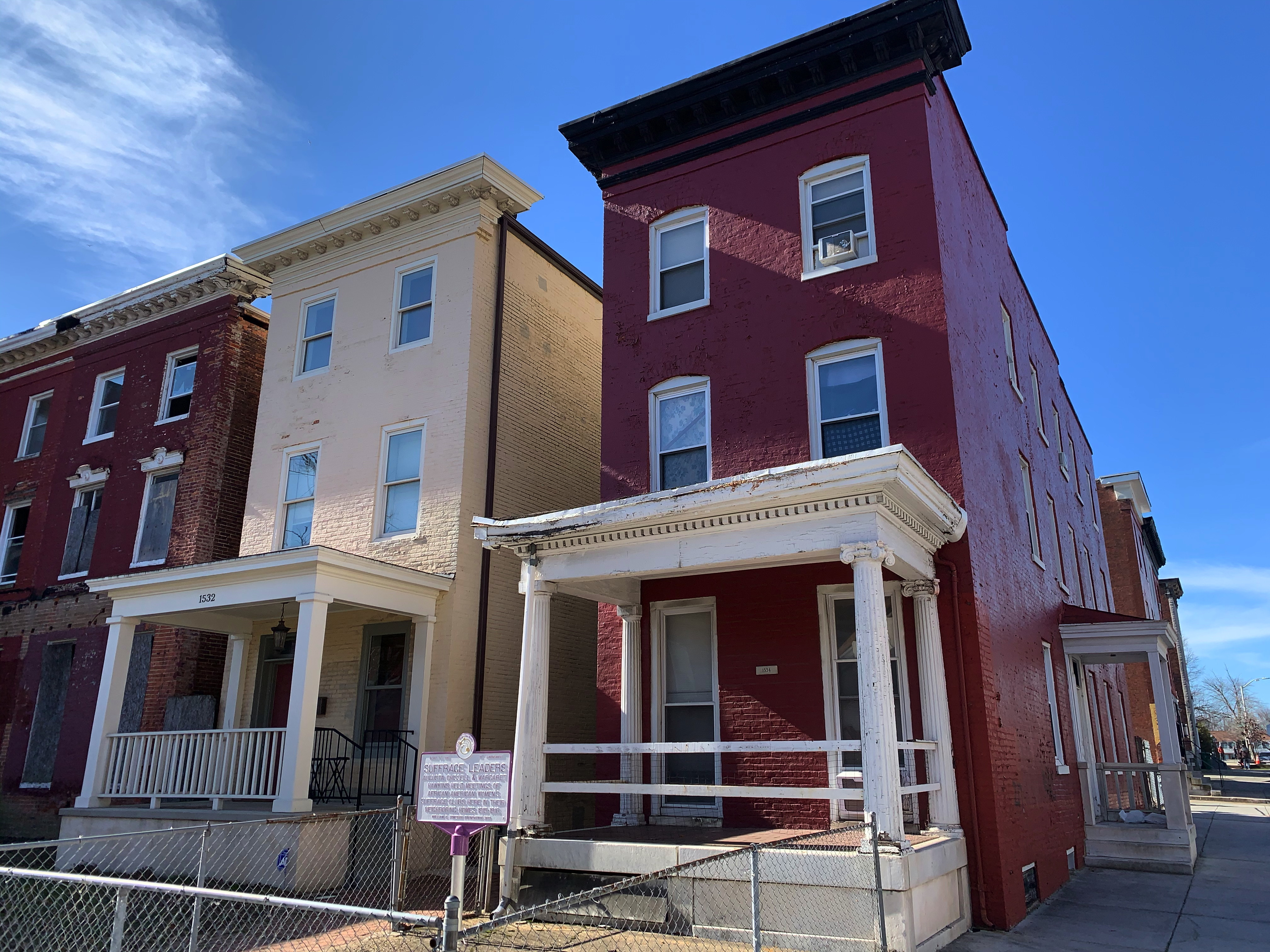
The former homes of Hawkins and Chissell in the Upton neighborhood of Baltimore

Chissell died May 14, 1973, and is buried at Mount Auburn Cemetery in Baltimore.

Chissell's story, along with those of Estelle Young and Margaret Hawkins, was not a part of published textbooks and was revealed through the work of Beverly Carter, the archivist of the DuBois Circle. Beginning in 2015, Carter used resources such as club minutes and articles from the Baltimore Afro-American to develop biographies of Black women who were active in Baltimore politics.

She was inducted to the Maryland Women's Hall of Fame in 2019. U.S. Representative Elijah Cummings nominated Chissell, writing about her work:

Ms. Chissell played an extremely important role in the suffrage movement even though women of color were often excluded from the mainstream organizational work to secure women's rights. With limited resources and support, she was a vocal supporter of the suffrage movement and continued working hard even after women won the right to vote to educate and activate new women voters.

In 2019, a historical marker was placed at 1532 and 1534 Druid Hill Avenue, the former homes of Hawkins and Chissell, as part of the National Votes for Women Trail.

In 2020 the editors of USA Today published the "Women of the Century" project in commemoration of the 19th Amendment, asking experts from each state to identify ten women who made significant accomplishments in the period of 1920 to 2020. Chissell was one of the ten women recognized for their groundbreaking work within the state of Maryland, three others being Billie Holiday, Adrienne Rich, and Barbara Ann Mikulski.

== See also ==
- List of suffragists and suffragettes
- Timeline of women's suffrage
