= Niklas Hallman =

Swedish Christian gospel singer

Lars Evert Niklas Hallman formerly Svensson, known as Niklas Hallman (born Jönköping, Sweden on 22 September 1975) is a Swedish Christian gospel singer, songwriter and pastor.

Niklas Hallmans family-oriented songs had a major impact in the country's free church worship song lists. He has also collaborated with Jon-Anders Marthinussen in writing.

His most recent album Ett mästerverk (meaning a masterpiece in Sweden), a compilation of 12 of his best songs including classic title track "Ett mästerverk" and "Spikarnas lovsång" plus 2 yet unreleased works "Ett har jag begärt" and "Från solens uppgång".

== Charts ==
Niklas Hallman's albums have enjoyed commercial success. His June 2011 album Om min Jesus reached #29 in the Sverigetopplistan, Official Swedish Albums Chart. The compilation album had a similar commercial success appearing in the general contemporary pop charts at #32 in its first week of release in June 2012.

== Personal life ==
He is married to Patricia Hallman (born in 1974) and together they led the national Kings Kids charity organization until 2008, when he became pastor of the Pentecostal church Gränna and concentrated on his gospel songwriting and recording.

For several years he has been also a worship leader and singer at the Pentecostal annual conference called Nyhemsveckan.

== Discography ==
=== Albums ===
- 1999: Inga andra Gudar
- 2001: Hopp
- 2003: Se
- 2007: Smyckad
- 2011: Om min Jesus (SWE #29)
- 2012: Ett mästerverk: Samlingsalbum (a compilation, SWE #32)
