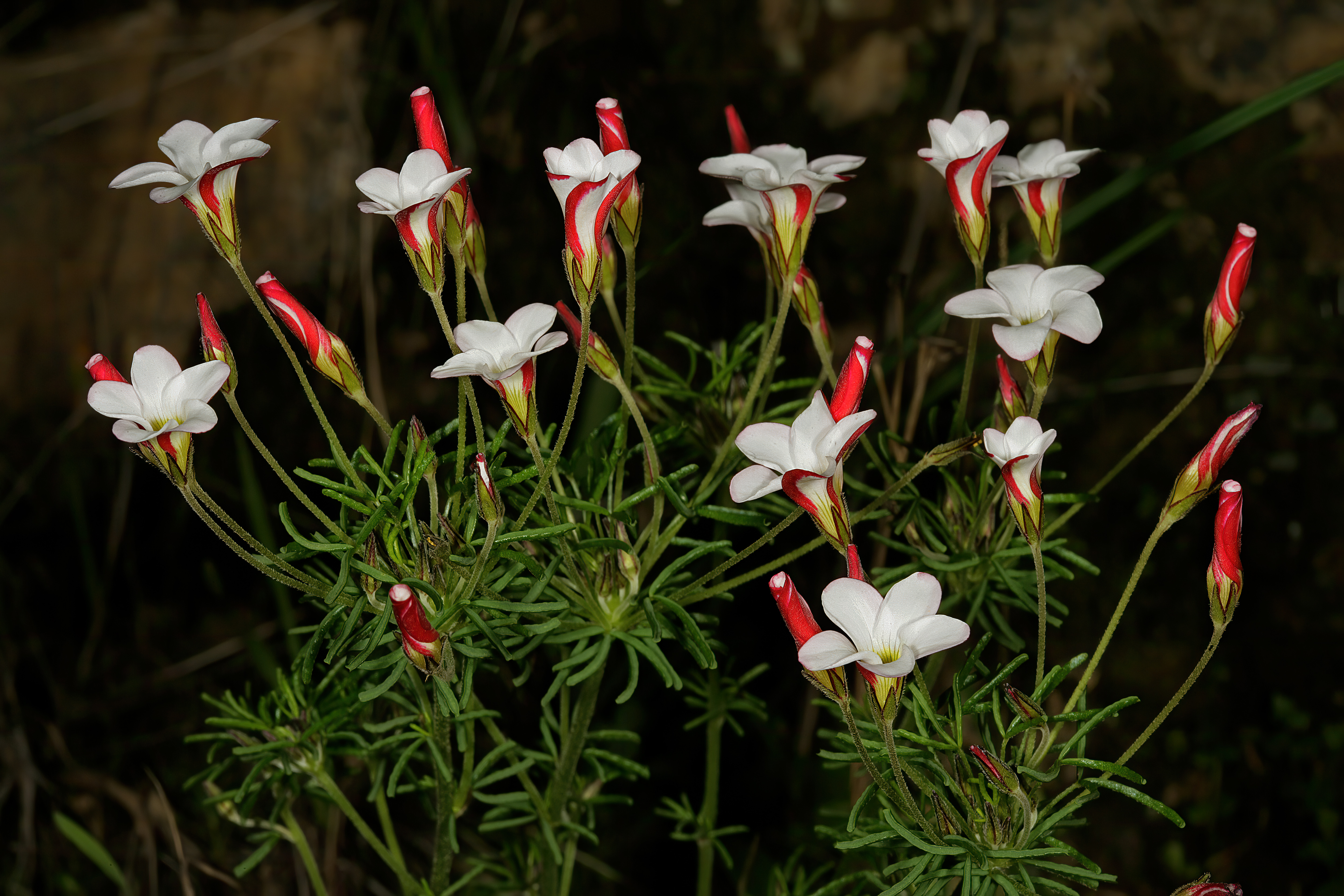

Scientific classification
- Kingdom: Plantae
- Clade: Tracheophytes
- Clade: Angiosperms
- Clade: Eudicots
- Clade: Rosids
- Order: Oxalidales
- Family: Oxalidaceae
- Genus: Oxalis
- Species: O. versicolor

Binomial name
- Oxalis versicolor L.

= Oxalis versicolor =

Candy cane sorrel

Species of flowering plant

Oxalis versicolor or candy cane sorrel is a species of flowering plant in the family Oxalidaceae found in South Africa.

A bulbous perennial, it grows to 8–15 cm (3.1–5.9 in) forming a mound of fresh green leaves, each leaf composed of three elongated leaflets. In late summer and autumn, narrow white tubular buds form at the tip of slender stems. A curved scarlet edging to each petal gives the appearance of a candy cane. The flowers open in full sunlight, but remain furled at other times.

In cultivation in the UK this plant is only completely hardy in mild or coastal areas, down to −5 °C (23 °F). It has been given the Royal Horticultural Society's Award of Garden Merit.

In the United States this plant grows up to 12 inches tall, prefers full to partial sun, blooms in the summer, and is hardy in USDA zones 7 – 9.
