= House at 9 North Front Street =

Historic house in Maryland, United States

- U.S. National Register of Historic Places
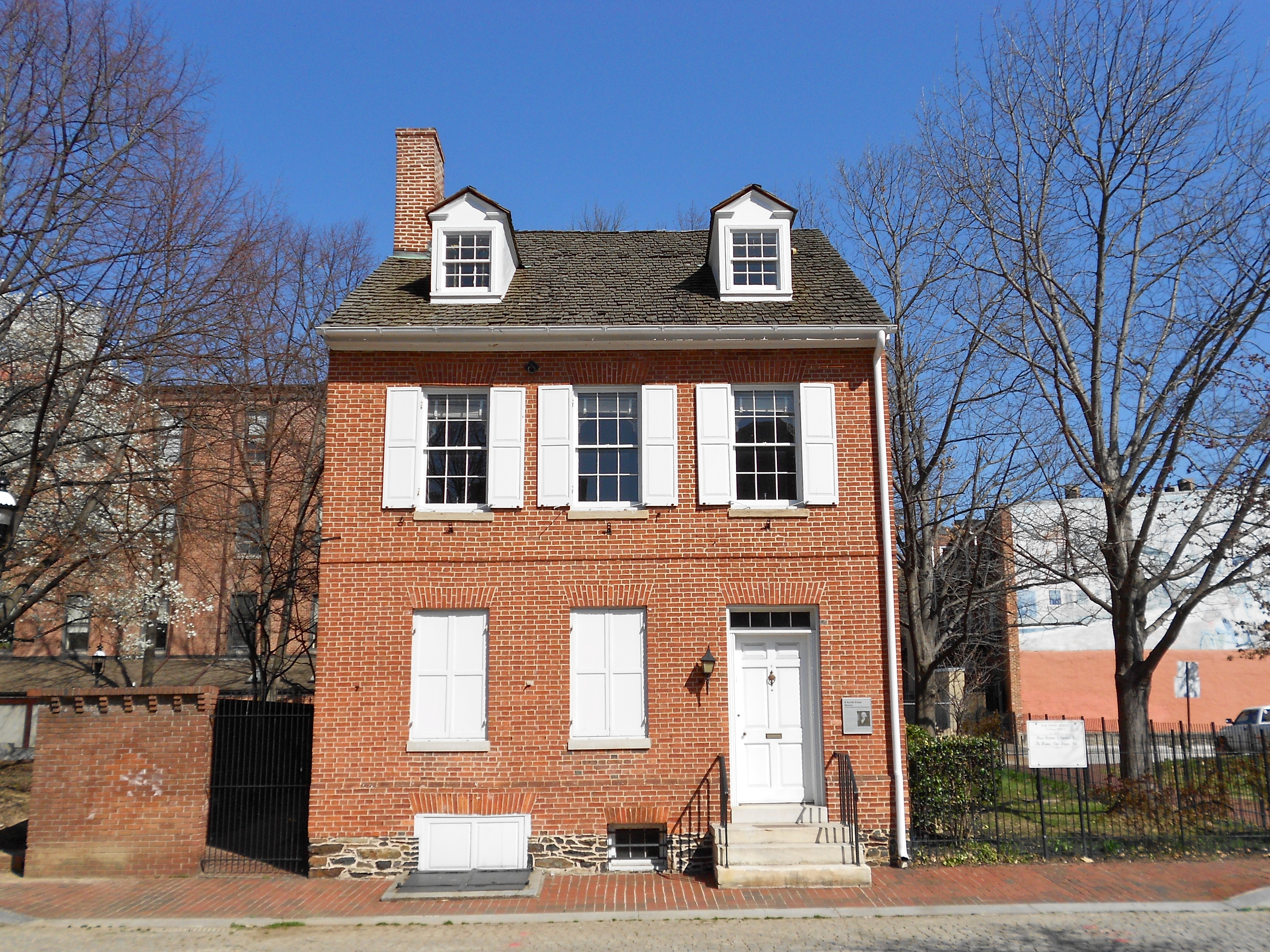
- Building in March 2012

- Location within Baltimore Location within Maryland Location within the United States
- Location: 9 N. Front St., Baltimore, Maryland
- Coordinates: 39°17′25.5″N 76°36′19″W
- Area: 0.1 acres (0.040 ha)
- Built: c. 1790
- NRHP reference No.: 79003217
- Added to NRHP: June 14, 1979

House at 9 North Front Street is a historic home located in the Jonestown Historic District in Baltimore, Maryland, United States. The building was rescued by Mary Ellen Gunther, Irene Kirby and the Women's Civic League during the Shafer administration.It is a 2 1/2-story brick townhouse with a 2-story rear wing. It is three bays wide and two rooms deep. The main house features a gable roof with two dormers on each side and two interior chimneys connected by a parapet. The house is located at 9 North Front Street and was built by either John Beale Bordley or Charles Torrence circa 1790. The house was the residence of Thorowgood Smith, second Mayor of Baltimore (1804-1808). It rests on an area of downtown Baltimore traditionally known as “Old Town”. Even earlier on, it was known as “Jones Town”. This area was annexed to Baltimore in 1745, and its settlement predates that of Baltimore Town. More specifically, the house is located in a neighborhood known today as Shot Tower Park. Once part of a whole row of Conservative Conservative Georgian style brick masonry 2 1/2-story townhomes, this house is the last extant example on the street, and one of just a few 18th-century townhouses remaining in all of Baltimore.

The House at 9 North Front Street was listed on the National Register of Historic Places in 1979. It is now the headquarters for the Women's Civic League.
