= Bobs Candies =

Brand of confectionery

Bobs Candies are a brand of candy manufactured by the Ferrara Candy Company.

== History ==
Bobs Candies was founded as the Famous Candy Company in Albany, Georgia, by investor Robert E. McCormack in 1919. He changed its name to Bobs' Candy Company in 1924 and later dropped the apostrophe. It is the largest manufacturer of striped candy in the world.

McCormack was the first manufacturer to wrap his candy in cellophane. Additionally, a family member is credited with inventing a machine for twisting and cutting stick candy in 1952. A year later, he invented a machine to bend it into a cane. The Keller Machine revolutionized the business and created a new industry - the commercial manufacture of candy canes.

In 2005, Bobs was bought from the McCormack family by Farley & Sathers, which then merged with Ferrara Pan in 2012 to become known as Ferrara Candy Company.

== Products ==
- Sweet Stripes Soft Mints
- Sweet Stripes Mint Sticks
- Candy Canes
- Mini Candy Canes
- Peppermint Balls
- Mint Lumps
- Cherry Lumps
- Sugar Free Butterscotch Discs
- Sugar Free Starlight Mints

== See also ==
- List of confectionery brands
