= Keller Machine =

Candy cane forming device

A Keller Machine is a machine for bending candy cane sticks.

== Patent ==
Patent #2,956,520 for a "candy cane forming machine" was issued on October 18, 1960 to Fr. Gregory H. Keller, a Roman Catholic priest who aside from his parish ministry helped his brother-in-law with his candy company. The patent was originally co-assigned to Robert E. McCormack. Robert McCormack was the founder of Bobs Candies.

== Design and operation ==
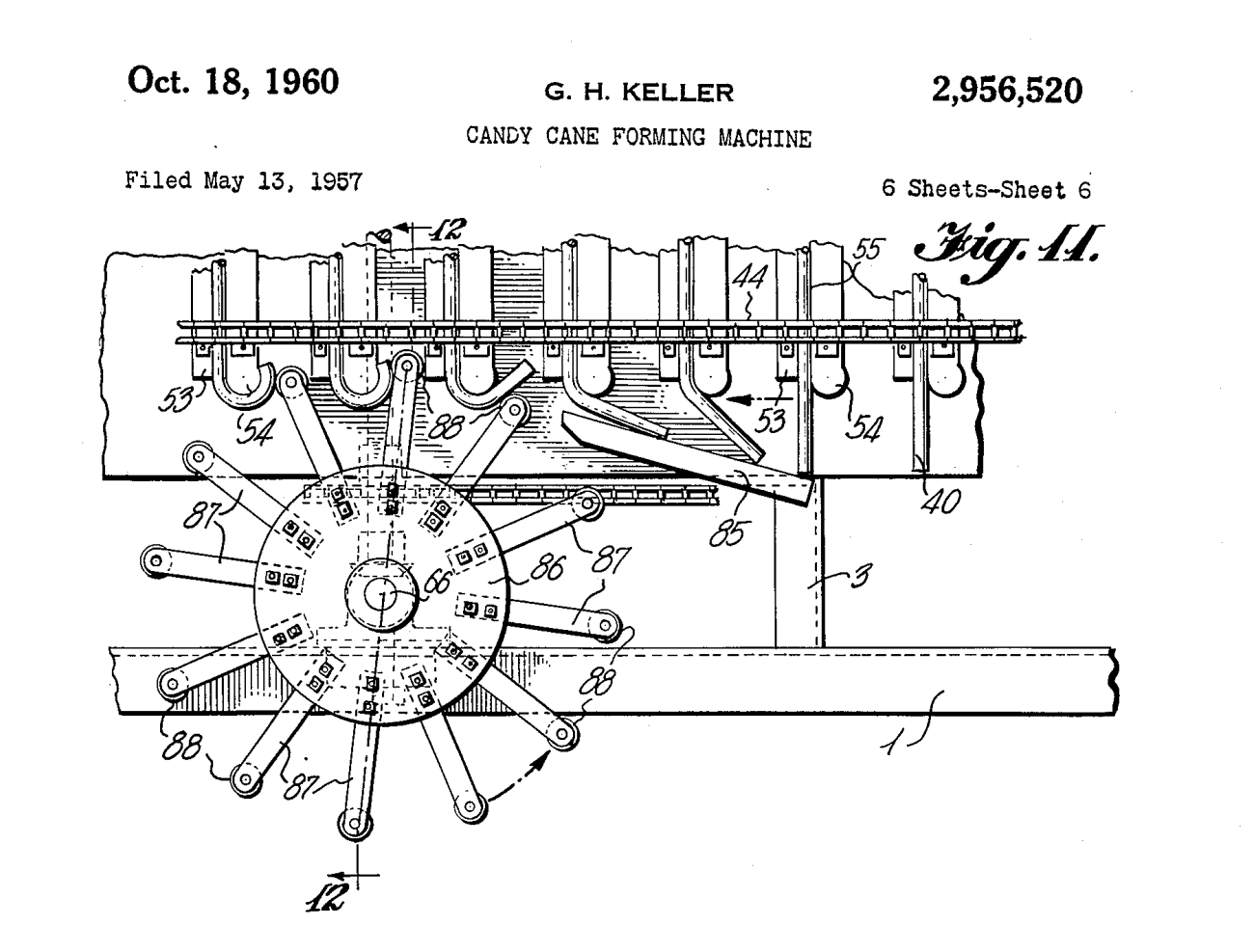
Keller's patent drawing

First, candy sticks cut to the desired length enter the machine. Each stick is bent individually, but the machine has a system of multiple grippers and rollers to continually bend the sticks, one after the other. As each stick enters the machine, it is positioned in a gripper which holds the straight portion of the cane with the part to be bent protruding out. Each gripper has on one side a curved die which the protruding end will be bent over. The candy stick is first bent to a right angle as it is moved past and put into contact with an inclined face. The patent application describes two potential versions of the mechanism which complete the bending process.

The first version of the mechanism has a chain around two sprockets on which are mounted bending rollers. Each bending roller is attached to a cam which rides along another inclined face to move the roller along the protruding surface of the cane to complete bending it around the die. In the second version, the chain and sprockets are replaced by a wheel on which the bending rollers are mounted.

== Modern production ==
In modern candy cane production, the sticks are wrapped in cellophane before they are bent.

Bobs Candies was sold to Farley's and Sathers in Spring 2005. Farley's and Sathers merged with the Ferrara Candy Company which continues to make candy canes under the Bobs name.

== See also ==
- Candy cane
- Food packaging
- Food technology
