= Gränna =

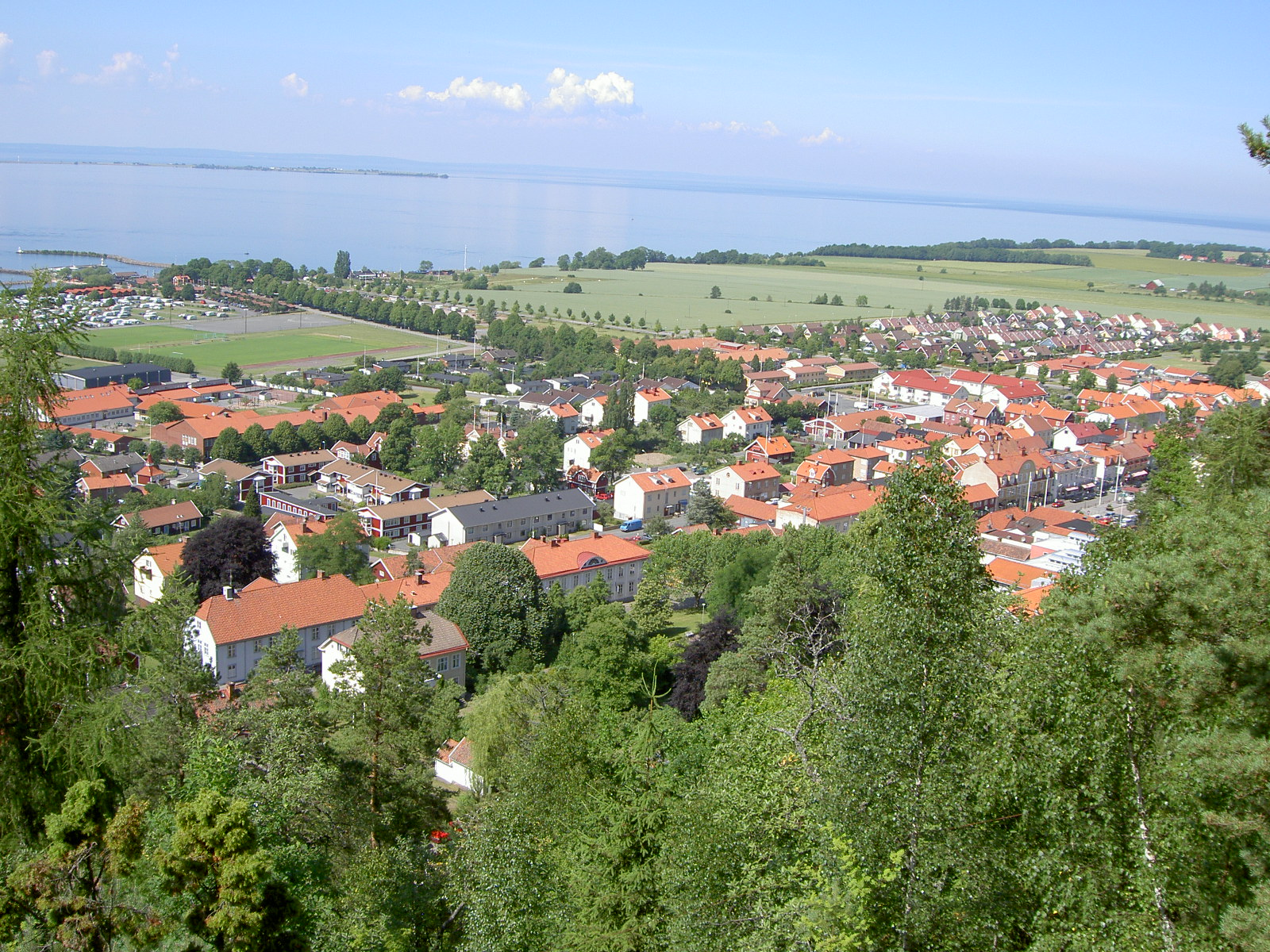
- View of Gränna in 2005

- Location within Jönköping Location within Sweden
- Coordinates: 58°01′N 14°28′E
- Country: Sweden
- Province: Småland
- County: Jönköping County
- Municipality: Jönköping Municipality

Area
  - Total: 1.87 km^{2} (0.72 sq mi)

Population (31 December 2018)
  - Total: 2,665
  - Density: 1,677/km^{2} (4,340/sq mi)
- Time zone: UTC+1 (CET)
  - Summer (DST): UTC+2 (CEST)
- Climate: Dfb

Gränna is a locality in Jönköping Municipality, Jönköping County, Sweden with 2,649 inhabitants in 2023. Founded in 1652 by Count Per Brahe, it is in Småland on the eastern shores of the lake Vättern, about 40 km north of Jönköping.

== History and academic development ==
The town is at the foot of Gränna mountain and is characterized by its steep streets and old wooden houses.

Up until the local government reform of 1971, Gränna and its immediate surroundings constituted a city municipality of its own; since then it has become an integral part of Jönköping Municipality.

Gränna is, despite its small population, for historical reasons often still referred to as a "city". Statistics Sweden, however, only counts localities with more than 10,000 inhabitants as cities.

Gränna is known for its red and white polkagris (literally "polka pig" in Swedish) stick candy, also known as peppermint rock. This was first made by the widow Amalia Eriksson in 1859. A statue of Amalia can now be seen in the park at the foot of Gränna mountain. The town is popular with tourists and is a connection point for the ferry service to the island Visingsö.

The balloonist Salomon August Andrée, who died in an attempt to reach the North Pole by balloon, was born in Gränna. The Grenna Museum hosts an exhibition of the expedition together with a collection of related objects and photos.

Gränna is also surrounded by several shops, cafés, and restaurants that provide a pleasant atmosphere alongside high-quality products. Under the initiative Mat run Gränna (Food around Gränna), a considerable amount of producers and companies, especially during the weekend in May that the Ascension Day takes place, organizes activities and events in their farms and local shops for tourists and locals, to promote the region's culinary.

=== Pathway Programme ===
Students studying the "Pathway Programme" at Jönköping University may live and study in Gränna. Campus Gränna is situated in the Centre of Gränna.

Campus Gränna's development dates back to Grennaskolan, which at the time was a national boarding school and later became Jönköping University's campus. Campus Gränna has been through several milestones, including when it became the Pathway Programme Centre and started its collaboration with Jönköping University, making many changes in its educational offerings.

The Pathway Programmes were developed by Carl Johan Odehammar, who serves as Project Developer and Programme Coordinator. He also teaches selected courses within the Programmes.

Students enrolled in the Pathway Programme courses are primarily international students, contributing to a culturally diverse study environment.

Pathway Programmes were designed to provide university preparation, language development and academic bridging for international students. The 3 Programmes published in Campus Gränna are:

- Pathway Year General/English (60 ECTS credits) with study length of 35 – 38 weeks.
- Pathway Semester General/English (30 ECTS credits) with study length of 16 weeks.
- Pathway Intensive English with a study length of 4 weeks.

Pathway students reside in Campus Gränna’s accommodation facilities, mainly located in Vulkanen, Postiljonen Norra, and Postiljonen Södra. Students are provided with half-board meals at the campus restaurant, and have access to facilities such as a gym and a music house.

In addition to classes held at Campus Gränna, Pathway students attend classes at Jönköping University every Wednesday. This ensures students to become familiar with Jönköpings city and the university buildings, and gives them opportunities to meet students from other programmes. Transportation between Gränna and Jönköping is typically by Jönköpings länstrafik buses 121 or 122.

Campus Gränna inhabits the Jönköping University environment, enabling collaborative projects, joint academic initiatives and cultural exchanges.

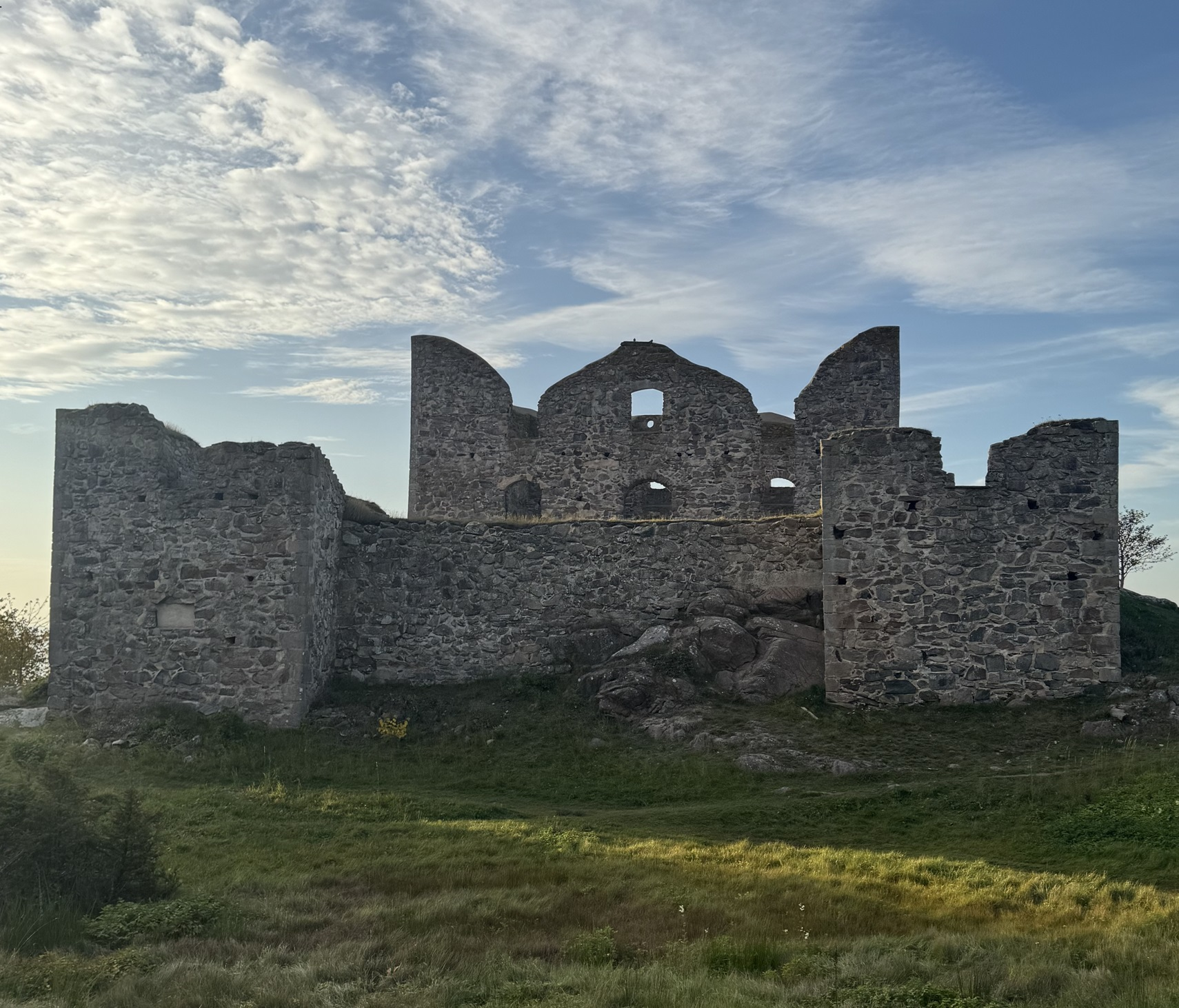
Brahehus, Gränna, Sweden

=== Brahehus ===
Brahehus is a historic landmark located on a hilltop above Lake Vättern, near the town of Gränna, in southern Sweden. The site has views of the lake and surrounding landscape, making it a tourist destination.

=== Historical significance ===
The Brahehus castle was built in the early 17th century by the Swedish noble family, the Brahe family, who were influential in Sweden during that time. The family owned vast estates, and Brahehus was intended as a symbol of their power and wealth. The construction of the castle began in 1638, under the direction of architect Carl Cederström, and it was designed in the Renaissance style. However, the castle was never completed due to financial difficulties, and the project was halted after the death of Per Brahe the Younger in 1680.

=== Destruction by fire ===
In 1708, Brahehus was destroyed by a fire, which reduced it to ruins. Despite this, the remaining parts of the castle's large, imposing walls are still visible today and continue to draw tourists and history enthusiasts.

The ruins of Brahehus are now part of the Brahehus Nature Reserve. Visitors can explore the castle ruins, hike the surrounding nature trails, and take in views of Lake Vättern. The site also features a nearby lookout tower that offers views of the lake and the countryside.

=== Connection to the Brahe family ===
The Brahe family, for whom the castle is named, played a significant role in Swedish history. One of the most famous members of the family was Tycho Brahe, an astronomer who made groundbreaking contributions to the field of astronomy during the late 16th century. Although Tycho Brahe was not directly associated with the construction of Brahehus, his family's legacy remains a defining feature of the castle's historical importance.

=== Gränna Museum ===
The Gränna Museum is a local museum located in the small village of Gränna, situated in the southern part of Sweden. The museum primarily focuses on the cultural and historical heritage of the region, offering a wide array of exhibits that highlight the area’s traditional craftsmanship, local history, and folklore.

The museum is best known for its collection of items related to Sweden’s famous candy, polkagris, a traditional candy that originated in Gränna. It showcases the history of the candy's creation and production, along with the story of how it became a symbol of the village. Visitors can learn about the process of making polkagris, as well as explore exhibits on the history of local trade, industries, and regional traditions.

One of the most notable aspects of the museum is its exhibition dedicated to the André Expedition. In 1897, Swedish aeronaut Salomon August Andrée and his team attempted to reach the North Pole by hydrogen balloon. The ill-fated expedition ended in tragedy, but the story is an important part of Swedish polar exploration history. The museum houses artifacts and documents related to the expedition, including equipment used during the journey, personal items of the explorers, and insights into the eventual discovery of their remains decades later.

In addition to its permanent collections, the Gränna Museum hosts seasonal events, workshops, and exhibitions that further explore the cultural identity of the region. The museum serves as both a cultural hub for locals and an educational resource for tourists interested in learning more about Gränna's unique history.

=== Grännaberget ===
Grännaberget is situated above the town of Gränna, with a 70 meter elevation. The area is a recreational and relaxing spot, including exercise and mountain bike trails, barbecue areas in the summer, toilet facilities, seasonal coffee shop and an outdoor museum.

The seasonal café Kaffestugan is open during the summer, serving guests with great views and offering a wide variety on the menu to have fika with friends. The main course and most renowned is the shrimp sandwich, and in addition to that, there are other pastries and sandwiches options available to enjoy.

On Midsommar, traditional swedish celebration is held at Grännaberget with games, serving chocolates wheel and lotteries. The Walpurgis Night is also celebrated in the mountain with a picnic.

Located approximately 1.5 kilometers from the trail on Gränna Mountain, the next hiking destination is Tégner Tower, also known as Skogstornet. On days with favourable weather conditions, it is possible to observe the four provinces surrounding Lake Vättern from this vantage point.

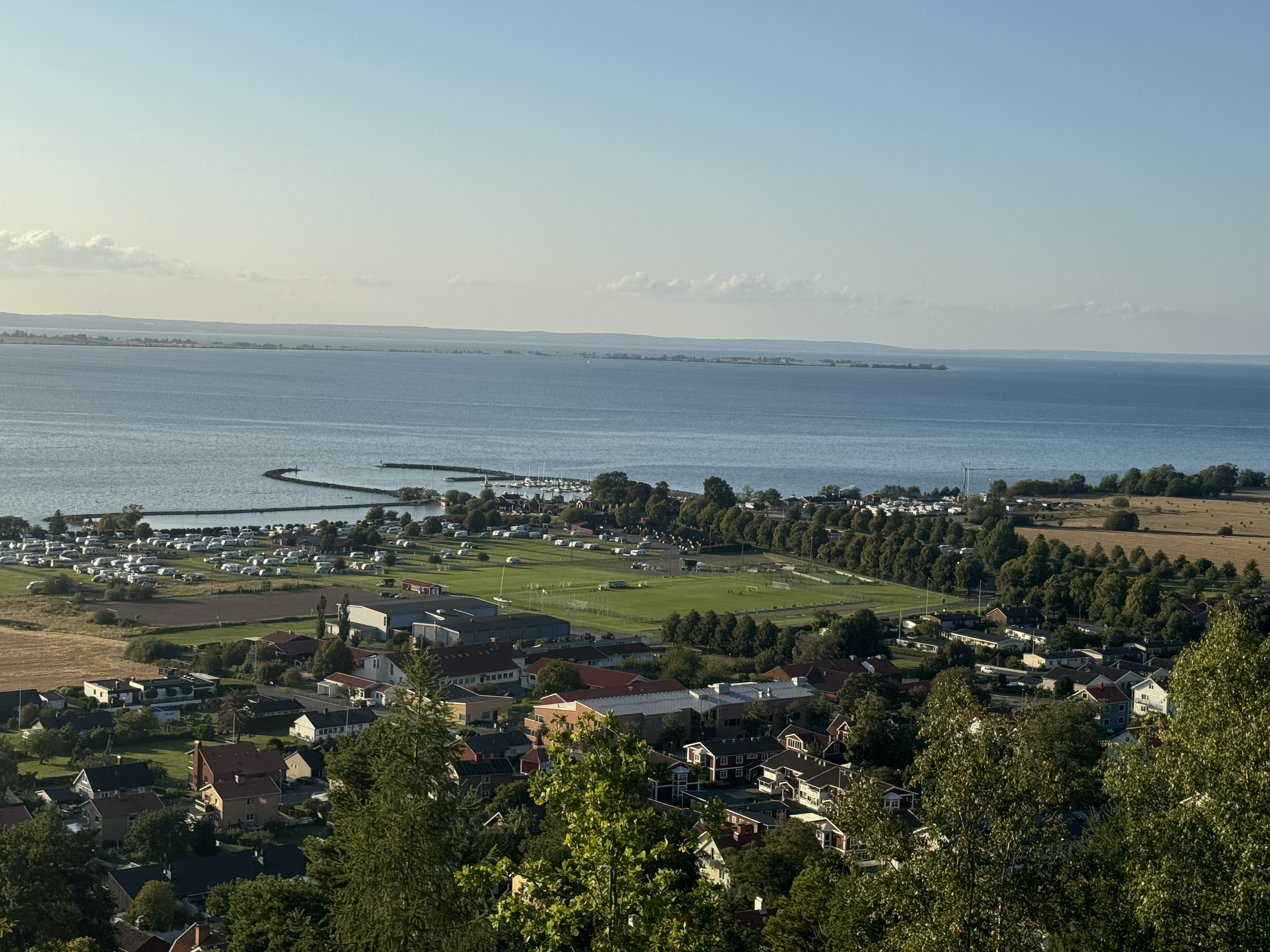
Lake Vättern, Gränna

=== Lake Vättern ===
Vättern(Swedish: '(Sjön) 'Vattern') is a picturesque freshwater lake located in the southern part of Sweden. Known for its clear waters and serene surroundings, Lake Vattern is a popular destination for outdoor enthusiasts, offering activities such as boating, fishing, and hiking. The lake is situated within a region rich in natural beauty, with forests and wildlife that attract nature lovers and tourists alike.

The lake has historical significance as well, with evidence of early settlements in the surrounding areas. It plays an important role in the local ecosystem, supporting a variety of aquatic life, including several species of fish. The area around Lake Vättern is also home to diverse plant life, making it a key part of the local environment.

Lake Vättern is accessible by road, with nearby towns offering accommodations for visitors. It is visited by locals and travelers.

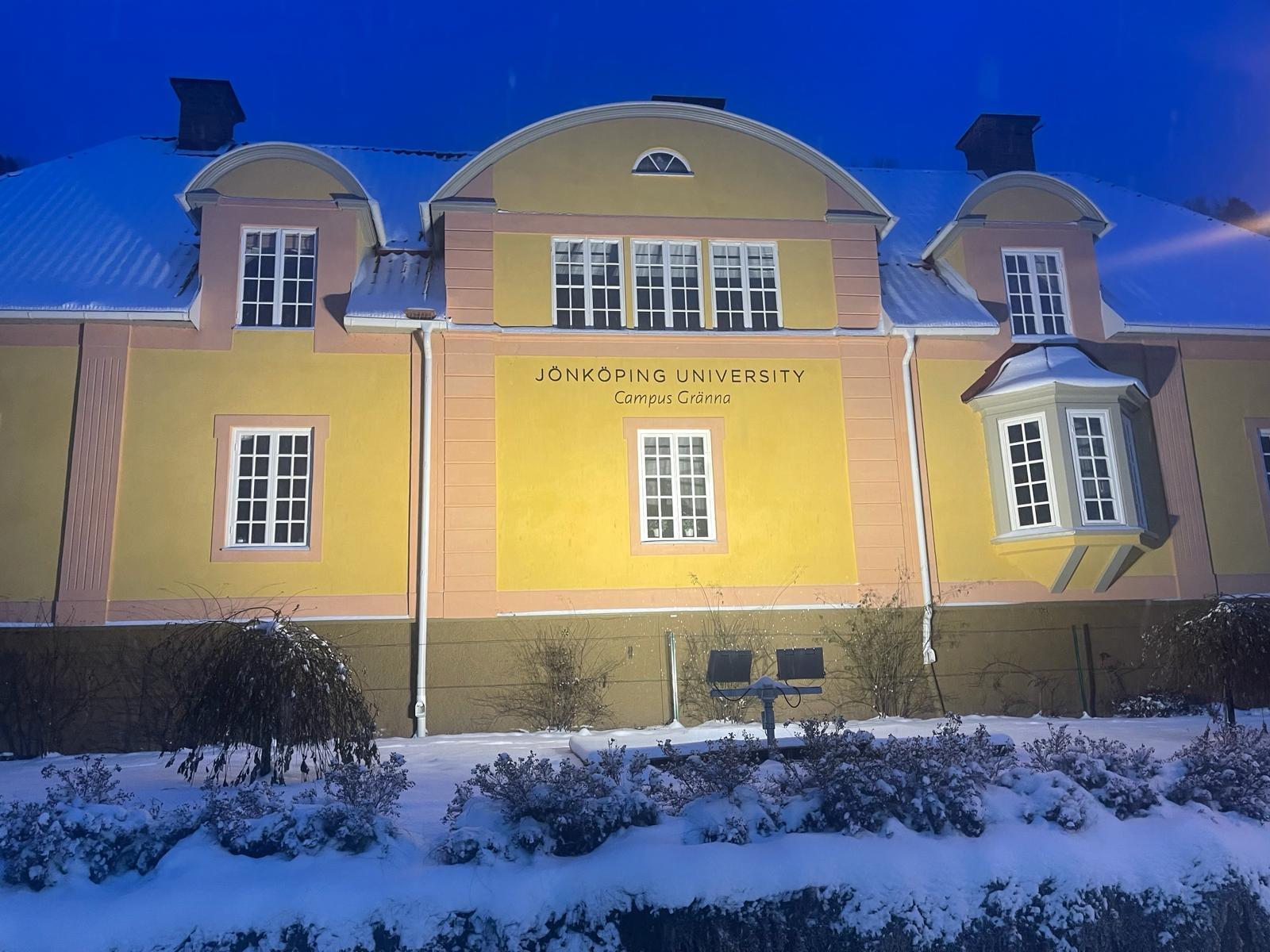
Campus Gränna

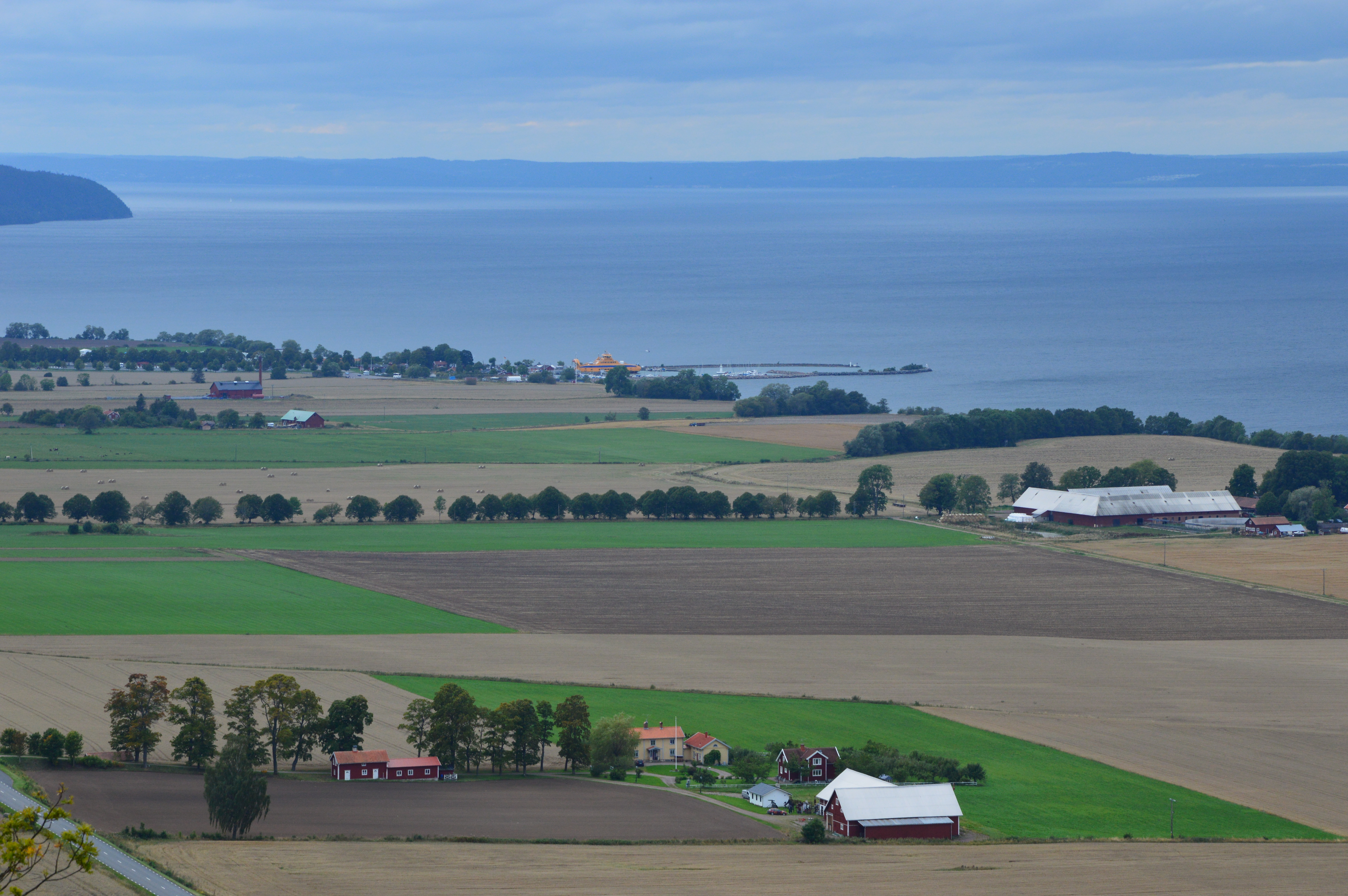
Gränna harbour

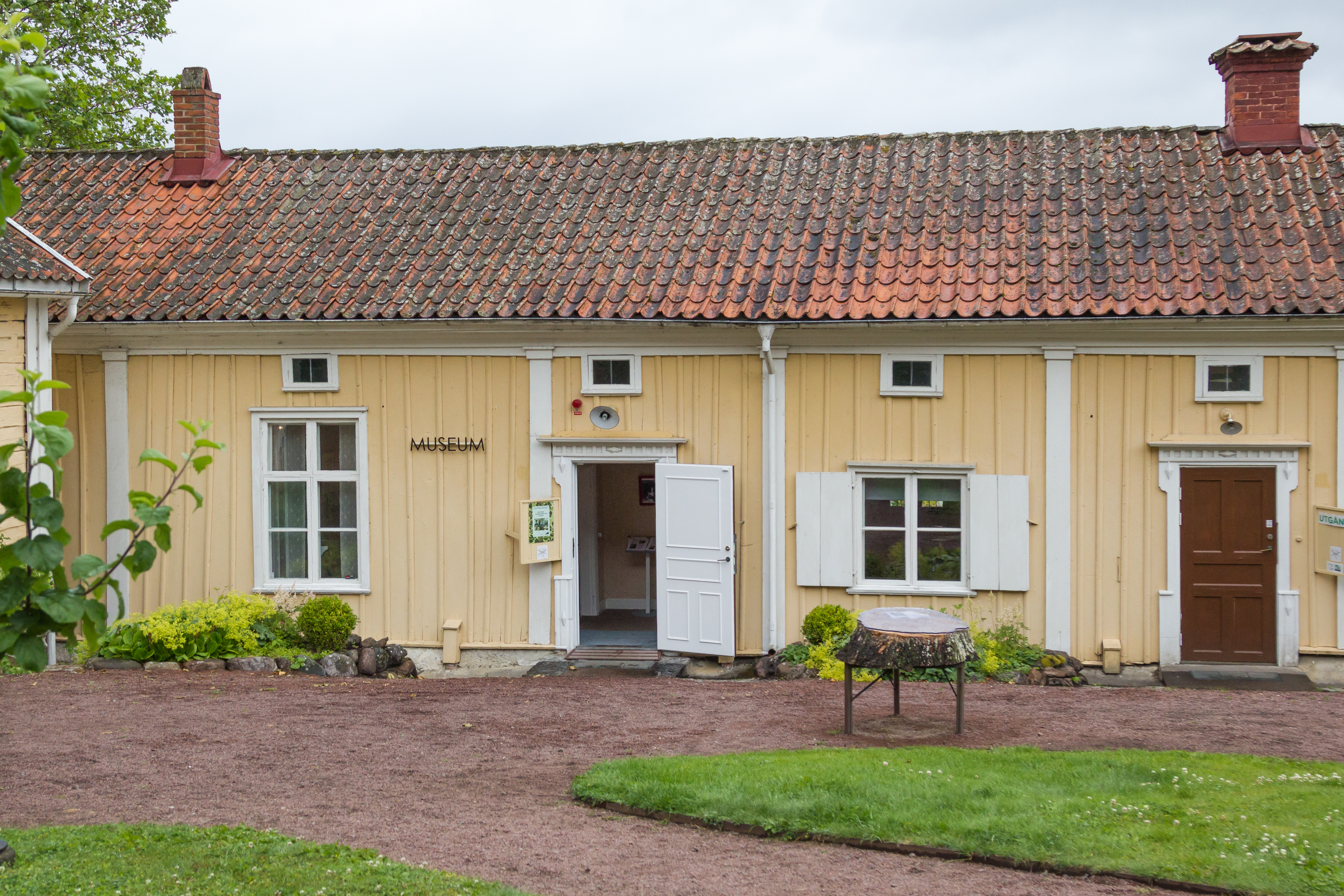
Local museum

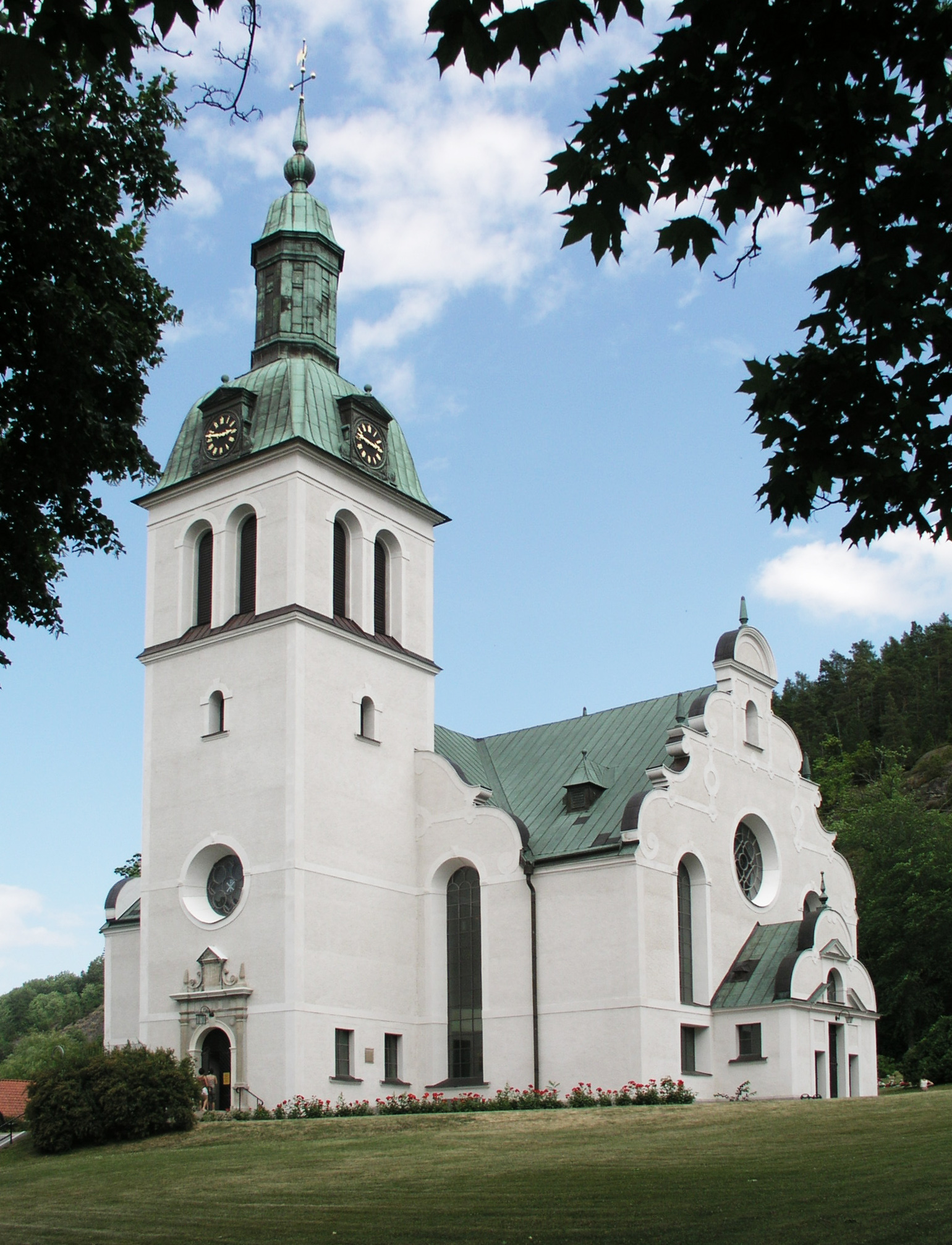
Church

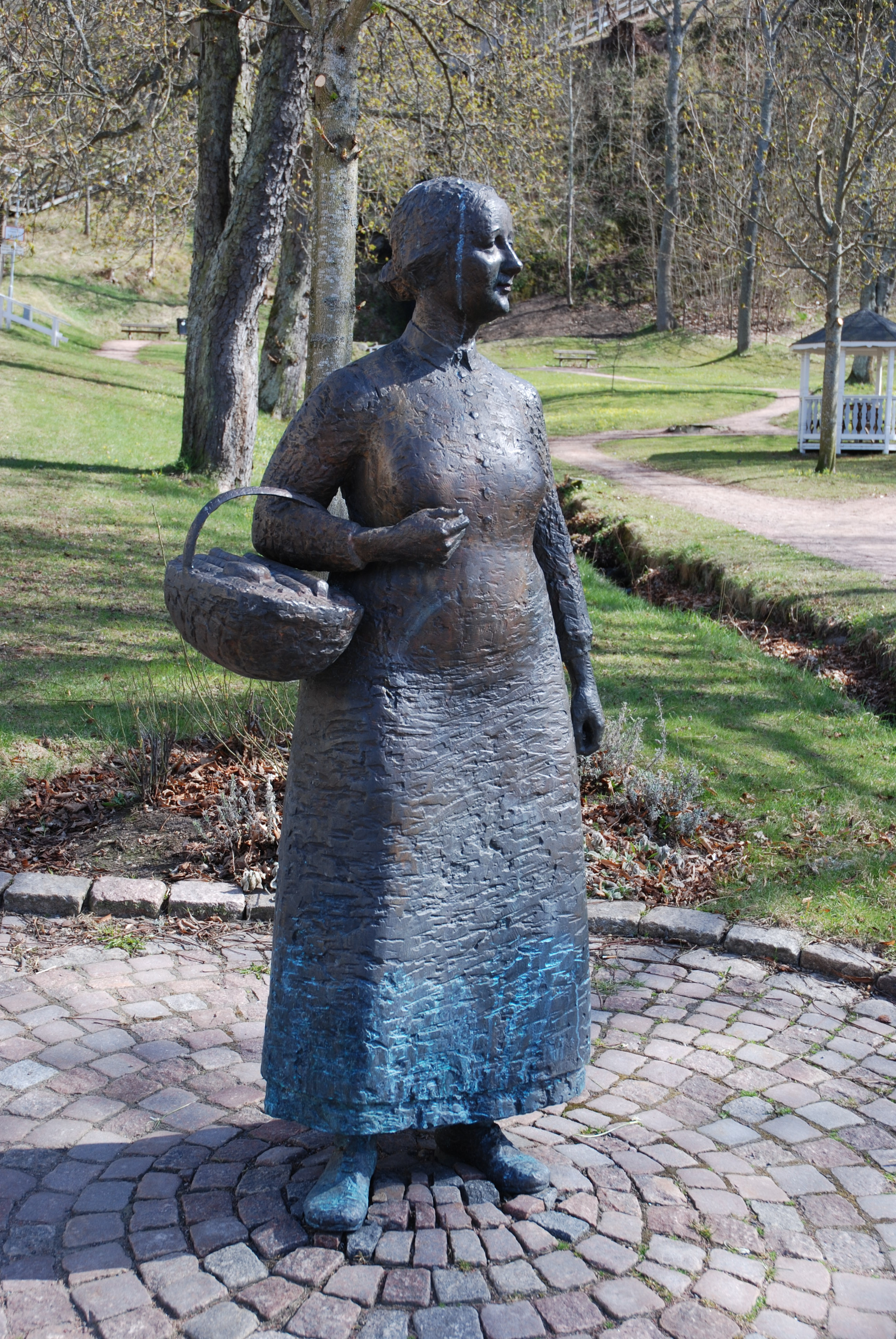
Statue of Amalia Eriksson

== Gränna in popular culture ==
- When Niklas Strömstedt wrote lyrics in Swedish for the musical Mamma Mia!, Glasgow was replaced by "Gränna" as the place which the singer calls from in the lyrics of the song Super Trouper.
