= Amalia Eriksson =

Swedish businesswoman (1824–1923)

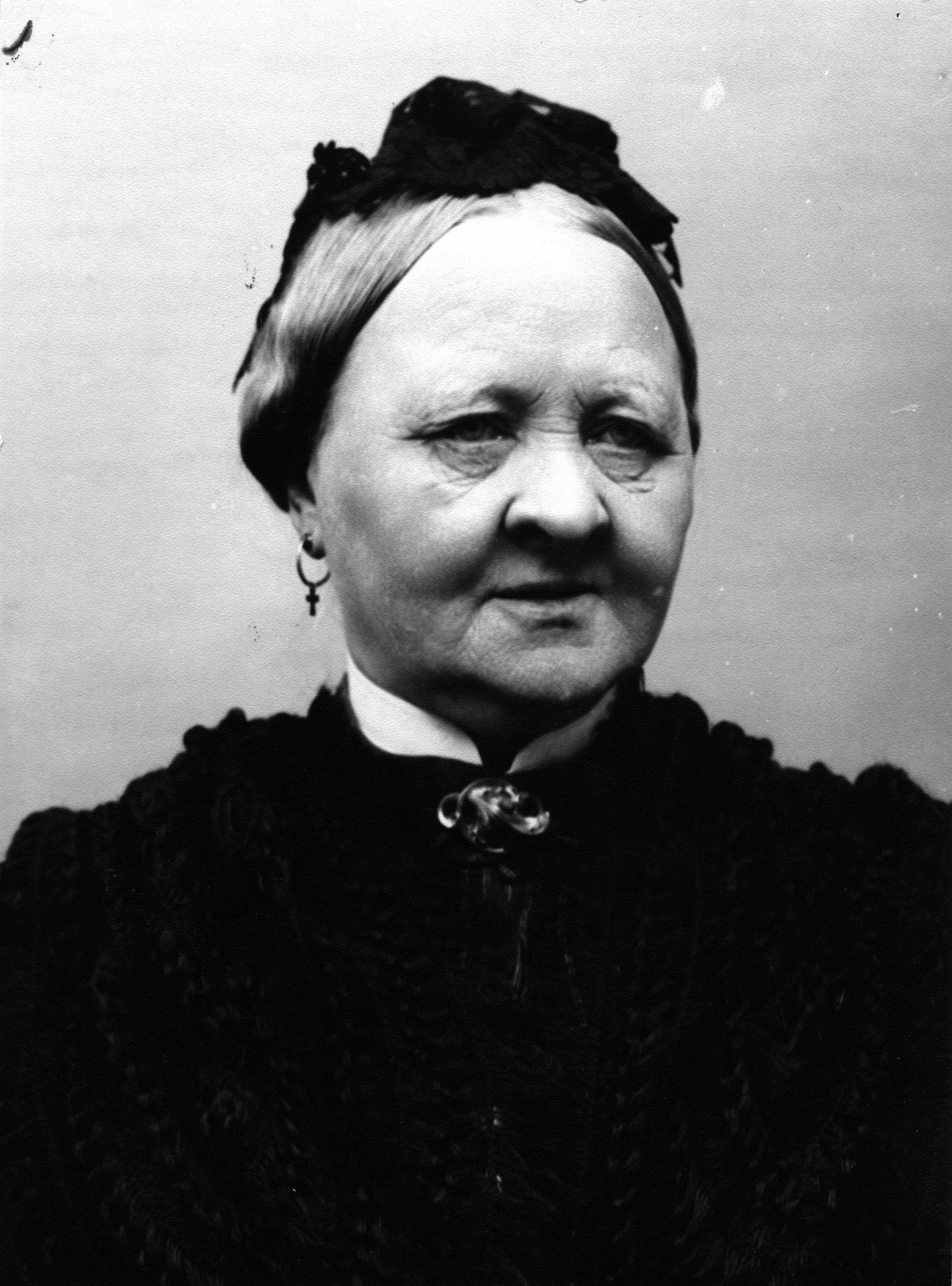
Amalia Eriksson - The Mother of the Polkagris

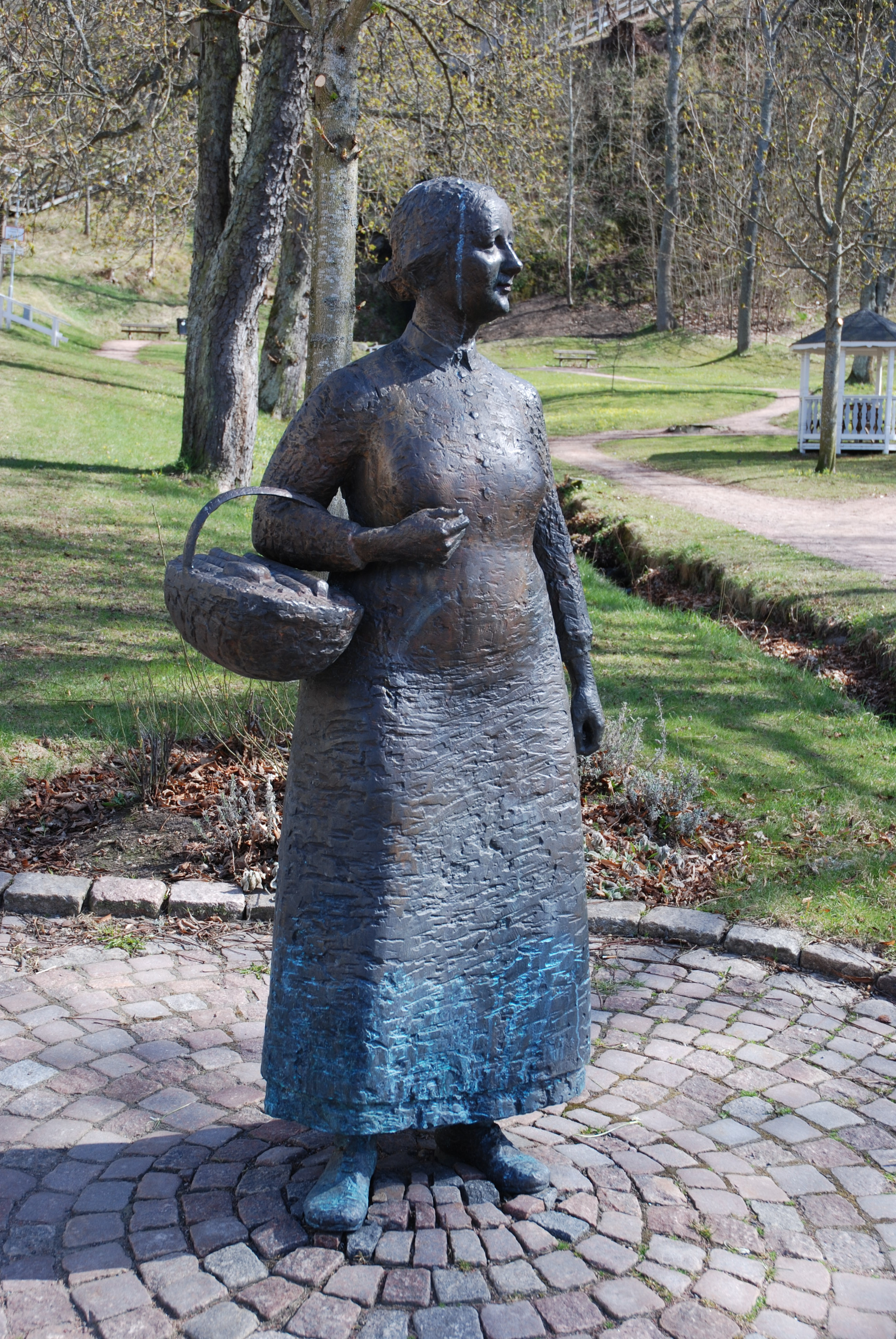
Amalia Eriksson – the Mother of the Polkagris— Lena Lervik (1997). This statue is located in Gränna, Sweden.

Amalia Elisabeth Eriksson, née Lundström (25 November 1824 – 19 January 1923), was a Swedish businesswoman, known as the inventor of the Polkagris, a type of candy stick known to have inspired the candy cane, which she invented in Gränna, Sweden.

== Life ==
Amalia Eriksson was born in Jönköping, the daughter of farrier Jonas Lundström and maid Katarina Hagen Andersdotter in the year of 1824. When she was 10, she lost her parents and all her siblings to infectious diseases, including the cholera epidemic. Amalia started working as a maidservant, following her mother’s footsteps. In 1855, she moved to Brahegatan 2, Gränna in the company of the Röding sisters, the family she was working for, which later became a hotel named after Amalia.

In 1857, she married tailor Anders Eriksson. After a year of marriage, Amalia gave birth to twins in September, where only one survived and the other was a stillborn. The surviving newborn girl was named Ida. Just a few days later, her husband also died of dysentery and she became a widow with a newborn daughter. In 1859, Amalia maintained a business selling Polkagris until she died. Amalia Eriksson died in Gränna at 99 years old and is buried at the Gränna cemetery along with her daughter Ida.

=== Career ===
In 1859, Amalia applied for a license to run a bakery and sell Polkagris. During this time period, prior to the Decree of Extended Freedom of Trade (Sweden) of 1864, there were legal difficulties for women to start a business. While it was common for widows to inherit and operate the business of their late husbands, there were legal obstacles to start a business because the majority of trades were still regulated by the Guild system, where few women could become members. However, it was an established custom for poor widows and married women to be given a special dispensation from this general rule by city authorities if they were in need of financial support: these women were called månglerska, and to manufacture and sell sweets was a common choice for women who had been given this common dispensation.

As was custom in accordance with the månglare regulations, the magistrate of Gränna granted Amalia Eriksson the license on due to her dire circumstances January 10, 1859. The story goes that Amalia made her Polkagris to alleviate some of the suffering her daughter faced being sick from the cold. Although it is unclear if she was the one who truly created the candy, she was the first person to produce it to sell as part of her business. Amalia developed a secret recipe with peppermint oil, sugar, water, and other ingredients that twisted red and white together in the form of small cushions and sticks. She sold this innovation at her bakery. Her Polkagris started gaining enough popularity that she stopped selling bread and focused just on her business of sweets, which allowed her to also buy the house at Brahegatan 2 from the family she used to work for. The popularity of Polkagris spread all throughout Sweden that Crown Prince Gustaf Adolf and his wife visited in 1915 to buy some sweets. Amalia was able to export her candy to different countries, including the United States. She became one of Gränna’s most influential and wealthiest people.

== Impact ==
After her death, her secret recipe was revealed and Ida continued the Polkagris business until 1945, when the business was spread through multiple people. “Äkta Gränna polkagris” is Gränna’s strongest trademark which only Polkagris made in Gränna can get. Even now, around 10 million Polkagris sticks of the original flavor and other flavors are made there each year, inviting tourists from all around the world. In Gränna, a statue of Amalia Eriksson stands in Södra Park in her honor, her home and workshop was turned into a hotel, and she also has an ice cream parlor named after her.
