= Margaret Hawkins =

African American Activist

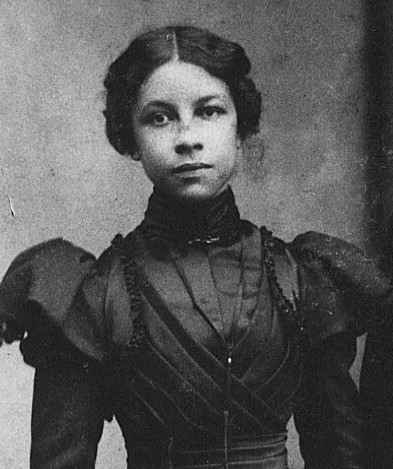
- Hawkins in 1910
- Born: August 5, 1877; Williamsport, Pennsylvania
- Died: April 8, 1969 (aged 91); Baltimore, Maryland
- Burial place: Arbutus Memorial Park
- Education: Howard University; St. Augustine College; Boston University
- Occupations: Teacher, suffragist

Margaret Briggs Gregory Hawkins (August 5, 1877 – April 8, 1969), worked as a schoolteacher and later became known for her activism on behalf of African Americans and women. She was inducted into the Maryland Women's Hall of Fame in 2021.

== Biography ==
Margaret Briggs Gregory was born in Williamsport, Pennsylvania, the third child of Professor James Monroe Gregory and Fannie Emma Whiting Hagan. Her three brothers included Eugene Monroe, James Francis, and Thomas Montgomery. Hawkins' father inspired her career in education, and her first teaching job allowed her to work alongside her father at Bordentown School. Hawkins graduated from the preparatory department of Howard University, St. Augustine College, and Boston University with a degree in history.

Gregory became a high school teacher at the Bordentown School (officially titled the Manual Training and Industrial School for Colored Youth, the State of New Jersey Manual Training School and Manual Training and Industrial School for Youth) for two years. Hawkins taught English, Grammar, Rhetoric, English Literature, and Modern Languages where she helped students in Latin and German. In 1900, she taught American history at Frederick Douglass High School (Baltimore's only public high school for children of color).

In 1905, Gregory married Mason A. Hawkins, the principal at Douglass High School, whom she met while teaching. They had two sons, Gregory, and Mason A. Jr., who both served in World War II. Hawkins took part in various organizations and clubs including the Board of Managers of Druid Hill Branch of the YWCA where she became the first African American woman to serve on the Central Branch YWCA executive committee of the Board of Directors. She had a profound influence on different organizations, such as the Steering Committee and Women's Division of the Civilian Defense Mobilization during World War II. In 1906 she became the first president of the Dubois Circle. She also served as vice president of the Progressive Women's Suffrage Club. She was introduced to the Board of Managers of the Maryland Training School for Colored Girls (which merged with the Montrose School for Girls in 1933). Later, Hawkins also committed to a six-year term in 1939 at the Maryland Training School Board.

She died in Baltimore on April 8, 1969, and was buried at Arbutus Memorial Park.

== National Association of Colored Women ==
The AFRO League held various names due to groups flooded together, one of them being the National Association of Colored Women which became the largest federation of African American women's clubs. The group began in 1896 by Mary Church Terrell and she endorsed the women's suffrage movement. The motto they followed read, "Lifting as We Climb" and it served as a daily reminder for each of the members and brought a sense of community among the group. They encouraged the members to "uplift" and support their fellow African Americans as they fought their way to equality and a multitude of opportunities.

African Americans and their fight for suffrage wanted more than just the right to vote. The National Association of Colored Women advocated for a wide scope of equality and topics to help improve the quality of life for all African Americans. Due to the Jim Crow laws in the South, people became segregated due to their skin color. This led to fewer opportunities for students in schools, adults in the workplace, and general function of life. This caused many major suffrage groups such as The National American Suffrage Association to remain segregated and exclude women of color. This opened the door for the National Association of Colored Women to make a stand and contribute to the fight.

Hawkins, Estelle Hall Young and Augusta Chissell became inducted into the association in 1912 and with the use of their prior experience from the DuBois Circle, they contributed many different elements of education and information for African American women looking to make a change but not knowing where to start and why it was important.

== Colored Young Women's Christian Association (CYWCA) ==
Clubs and leagues began to form throughout the country to gather awareness, fight for equality, and provide education to African American women. While some brave souls met in political settings, others congregated in churches and local homes to learn about what they could do in the quest for knowledge and power. Some local religious spaces activists that Hawkins and her colleagues Chissell and Young met included Sharp Street Methodist, Union Baptist, and Grace Presbyterian Church. From this group which were founded by Hawkins, Chissell, and Young, sprang its parent group titled National Association of Colored Women which met primarily in Baltimore. The CYWCA laid the foundation for future suffrage groups in the Baltimore region and the space allowed other for other gatherings and meetings to form due to the welcoming atmosphere. The education classes shortly after the ratification of the Nineteenth Amendment met in the Maryland Federation of Christian Women's space.

== Colored Women's Suffrage Club or the Progressive Women's Suffrage Club ==
The Nineteenth Amendment passed on August 18, 1920, and suffragettes around the country fought for over 70 years before getting to that point. Many suffrage groups worked with their close-knit communities in houses and undisclosed locations to gain momentum and support. The General Federation of Women's Citizenship acted as a large umbrella which housed thousands of women's suffrage clubs throughout the country. They took place in homes and everyday settings because of the pressure of women's societal identity as homemakers. The motivation for activism stemmed from the fight for democracy and the fear of another war breaking out. The gradual growth of the group connected to the evolving issues the country needed to face. The fight for citizenship rights such as voting continued up until 1920. Afterwards, clubs shifted to provide support to the war effort. However, these groups contained segregation, and women of color and white women could not participate in the same groups. Many of the white leaders decided women of color should not have the right to vote, but through the help of the Fifteenth Amendment, the fire for equality became fueled. Women of color fought for better living conditions and against discrimination.

The Progressive Women's Suffrage Club began in Baltimore in 1915 by Estelle Hall Young and it worked to promote women's suffrage and other major civil rights matters. The group used persuasion and education to make a stance throughout history on major political and social issues. This group became one of the earliest known and documented African American suffrage clubs in the United States. In 1916 during one of their meetings on women's suffrage, the club saw a total of 250 attendees. After that point, the Progressive Women's Suffrage Club began meeting at the colored YWCA up until the ratification of the Nineteenth Amendment. Eventually, the group focused on educational classes and training to teach voters the importance of their vote and how they could effectively use their new right.

Hawkins played a fundamental role in the club's success through her educational background and expertise of over 40 years. She was known for opening her door to any meeting needed by the club and worked hard to promote the need for education and knowledge. Some of Hawkins' most notable work within the group included the work of maintaining retention of the Fifteenth Amendment due to a period when the rights of African American men became threatened at the risk of losing the basic rights outlined in the new constitutional amendment. One local reporter stated at the time that "[I]n Maryland an amendment became pending to disfranchise colored men. If the colored men of the state organize and educate each other, the amendment will be killed, and its advocates will hardly venture to make it an issue in this state again. Its death and burial will hasten the death of Jim Crow and disfranchising laws". The women at the end of the fight proved to be successful in fighting for the men's rights to vote, register and retain the franchise. Hawkins led the group in social justice, not just for African American women, but for all people regardless of sex, race, religion, etc. She modeled her many practices after her parents, who each had their share in fighting for social justice. Through her educational experience, she emphasized the full benefits of citizenship, community improvement, and a public voice. These meetings became known as "Citizenship Meetings".
