= Christmas Village in Baltimore =

Christmas market in Baltimore, Maryland

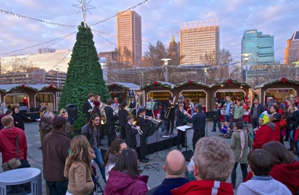
- Frequency: Annual
- Locations: Inner Harbor, Baltimore, Maryland
- Inaugurated: 2013
- Website: www.baltimore-christmas.com

Christmas Village in Baltimore is an annual holiday market event in Baltimore's Inner Harbor, with vendors in both traditional wooden booths and a festival tent. Commercial vendors sell international seasonal holiday gifts, ornaments, arts and crafts, as well as European food, sweets and hot beverages.

Along with an Ice Rink at the Inner Harbor amphitheater, Christmas Village is one of Downtown Baltimore's holiday attractions.

Christmas Village is held at Westshore Park since 2013, except 2020.

== About ==
Christmas Village in Baltimore claims to be modeled on the style of traditional German Christmas Markets. Christmas Market events such as the famous Christkindlesmarkt in Nuremberg, which dates back to the 16th century, are part of a long tradition of farmers' markets in Germany's inner cities.

Several vendors sell food specialties such as German bratwursts with sauerkraut, schnitzel, Bavarian pretzels, Swiss cheese and French crepes. Sweet food offered include bratapfel, lebkuchen (gingerbread cookies), stollen, spekulatius, rosted nuts, kettle corn and cotton candy. In addition to hot drinks such as hot chocolate, Christmas Village offers Gluhwine (mulled wine), a spiced wine.

Besides local vendors and artists, there are German vendors selling Ore Mountains Christmas decorations, pewter ornaments, candles, nativity sets, glass ornaments, toys, woolens, wooden ornaments, lace, spices, jewelry and other gifts.

The booths' assortment is related to the holiday season.

== Event program ==
The event hosts daily live performances on a stage centered in the Christmas Village festival tent. Local performers are string and brass bands, soloists and school choirs. Kid's Carousel, balloon artists and face painting offer programming for families at weekends. An opening ceremony with the original Christkind from Christkindlesmarkt Nuremberg, a German American Weekend and a Family Day are advertised as weekend specials.

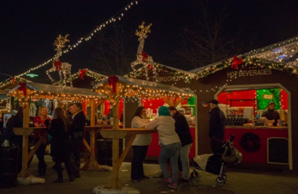
Christmas Village Standing Tables

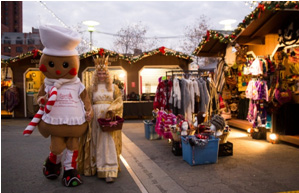
Nuremberg Christkind and Mascot Gingy

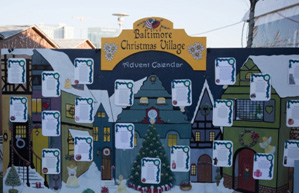
Advent Calendar

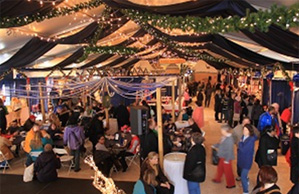
Festival Tent and Beer Garden

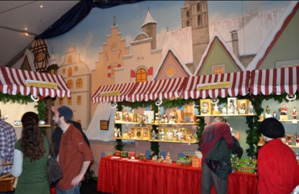
Käthe Wohlfahrt Vendor Area

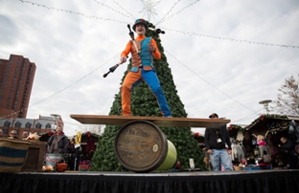
Performer on Outdoor Stage

== See also ==
- List of Christmas markets
- Christmas market
