= Polkagris =

Swedish stick candy

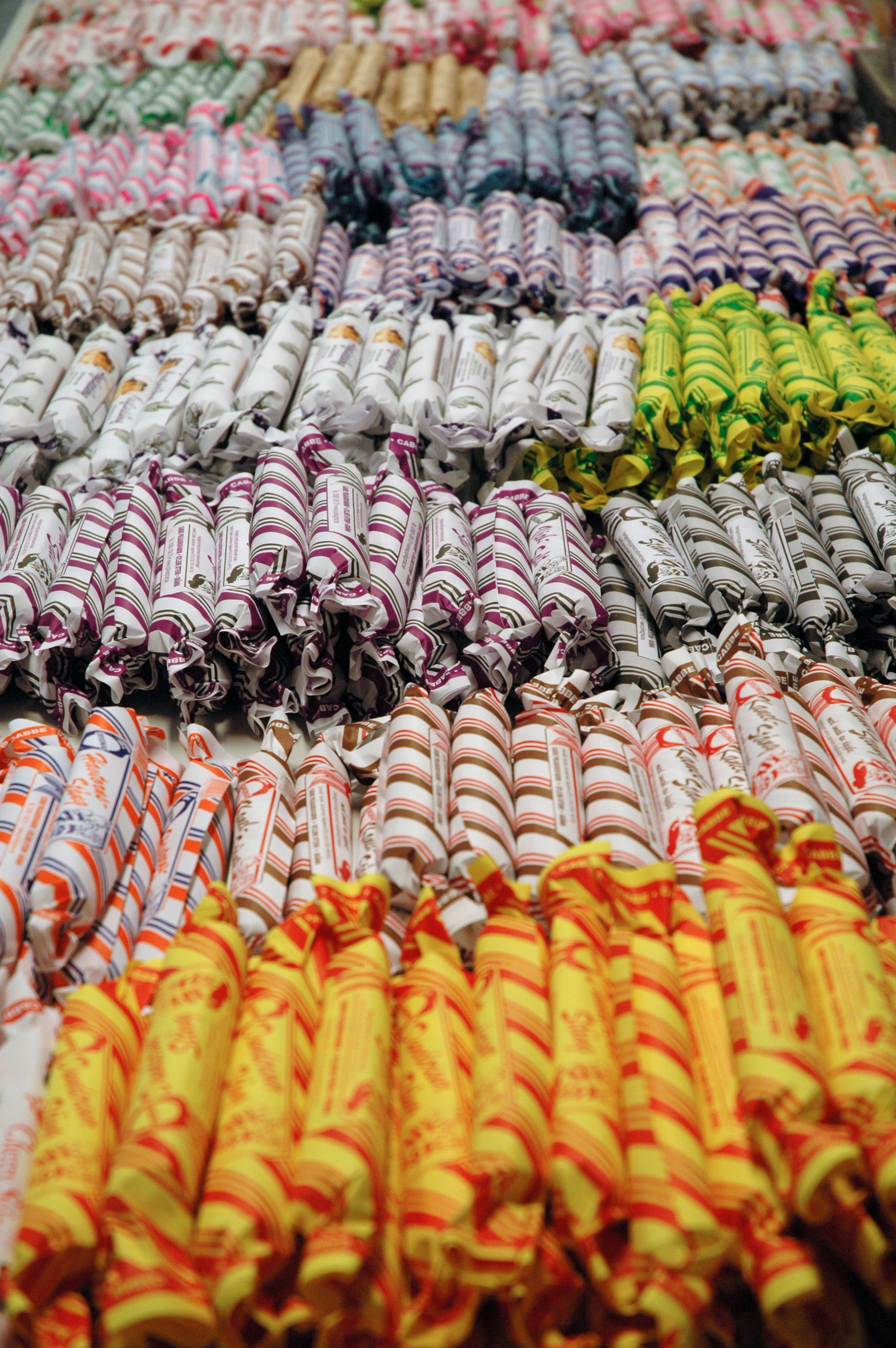
- Type: Candy stick
- Place of origin: Sweden
- Region or state: Gränna
- Created by: Amalia Eriksson
- Main ingredients: Sugar, peppermint
- Other information: EU-Status: Protected

Polkagris (plural: polkagrisar) is a Swedish stick candy that was invented in 1859 by Amalia Eriksson in the town of Gränna, Sweden. It remains a well-known albeit old-fashioned candy in Sweden, often sold at fairs, Christmas markets, and the like. It is still closely associated with Gränna. The traditional polkagris candy stick is white and red, and is peppermint-flavoured.

Genuine Polkagris has had a protected geographical indication since 21 July 2022 by EU and Livsmedelverket, which must therefore be manufactured in Gränna to be called genuine Polkagris.

== Etymology ==
The name "polkagris" literally means "polka pig".

"Polka" in the candy's name refers to a lively Slavic swirling dance, polka, which was still a novelty when the polkagris was invented. The dance originated in the middle of the 19th century and is still a common genre in Swedish folk dance and folk music. It may recall the way a traditional polkagris is made, twisting red and white sugar dough ribbons.

"Gris" means "pig", and was at that time used as an expression for candy.

== History ==
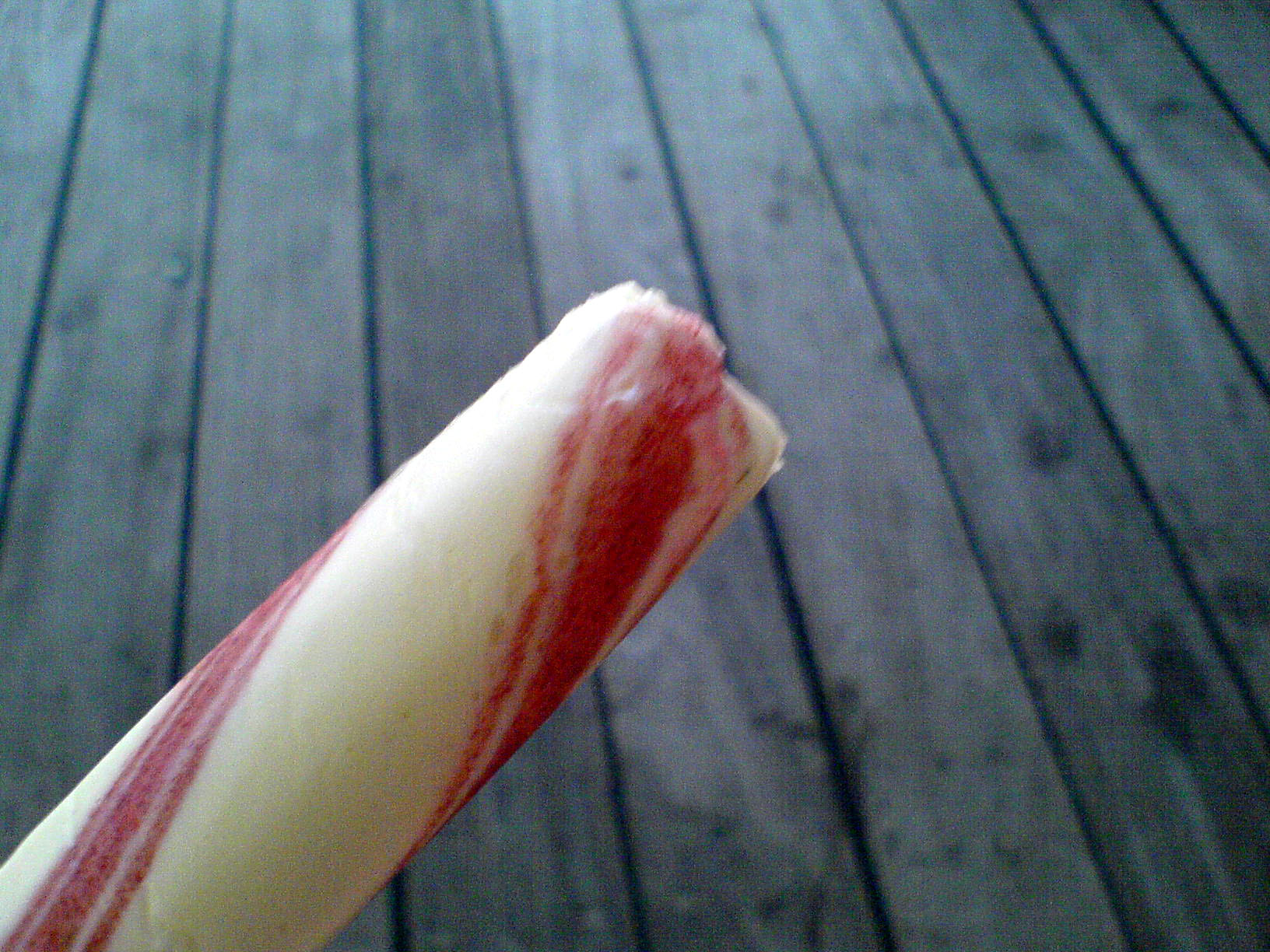
The traditional red and white polkagris

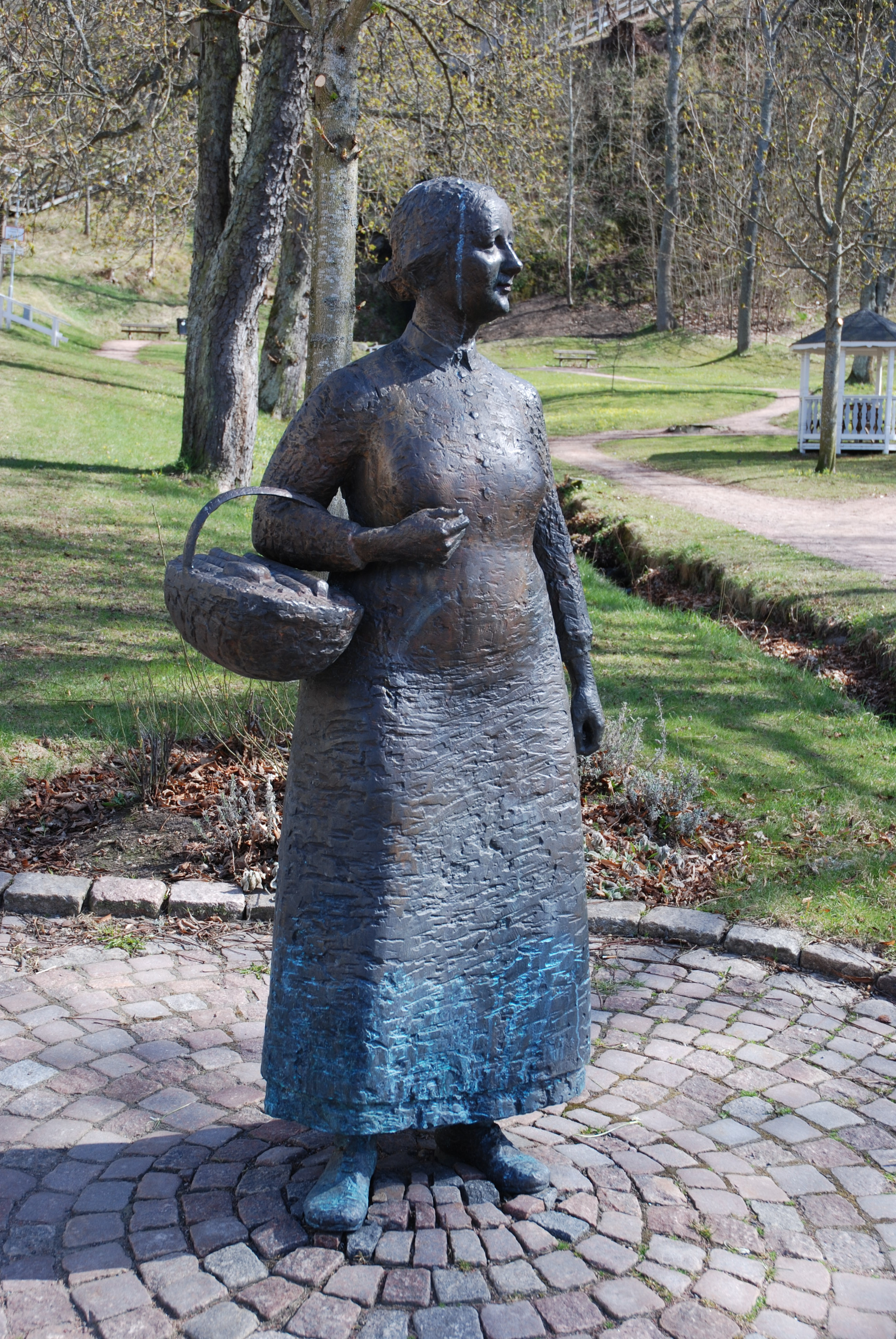
Lena Lervik: Amalia Eriksson – the mother of the polkagris. This statue is located in Gränna, Sweden.

Polkagris is a special candy stick type which was invented in Gränna 1859 by Amalia Eriksson (1824–1923), a poor 35-year-old widow. Amalia needed to support herself and her family, when her husband died. Amalia Eriksson got the town council's permission to open a bakery to make pastries and peppermint rocks, and opened a shop in Gränna. She kept the recipe secret and it was only revealed upon her death.

The candy is made of sugar dough which is boiled, kneaded on a marble baking table, pulled, and twisted by hand to the right size. The candies contain peppermint, sugar, water, and a very small amount of vinegar, and are sold in about 20 stores in the town.

The candies come in a variety of shapes, sizes, and colors, but the classical version is a straight, peppermint-flavored stick colored in red and white. The recipe has been included in Swedish cookbooks.

The town of Gränna has only 2,500 residents, but its convenient location off one of the most traveled highways in Sweden attracts over a million visitors per year, many of them drawn by the famous candy, which has been a tradition for more than 150 years.

The first store making polkagrisar outside of Gränna opened in the summer of 2011, on Lilla Nygatan 10 in the Old town of Stockholm.

In 2016, polkagris made its debut in the US in the small town of Solvang, California. It is made by hand in small batches at the Swedish Candy Factory.

== Championships and records ==
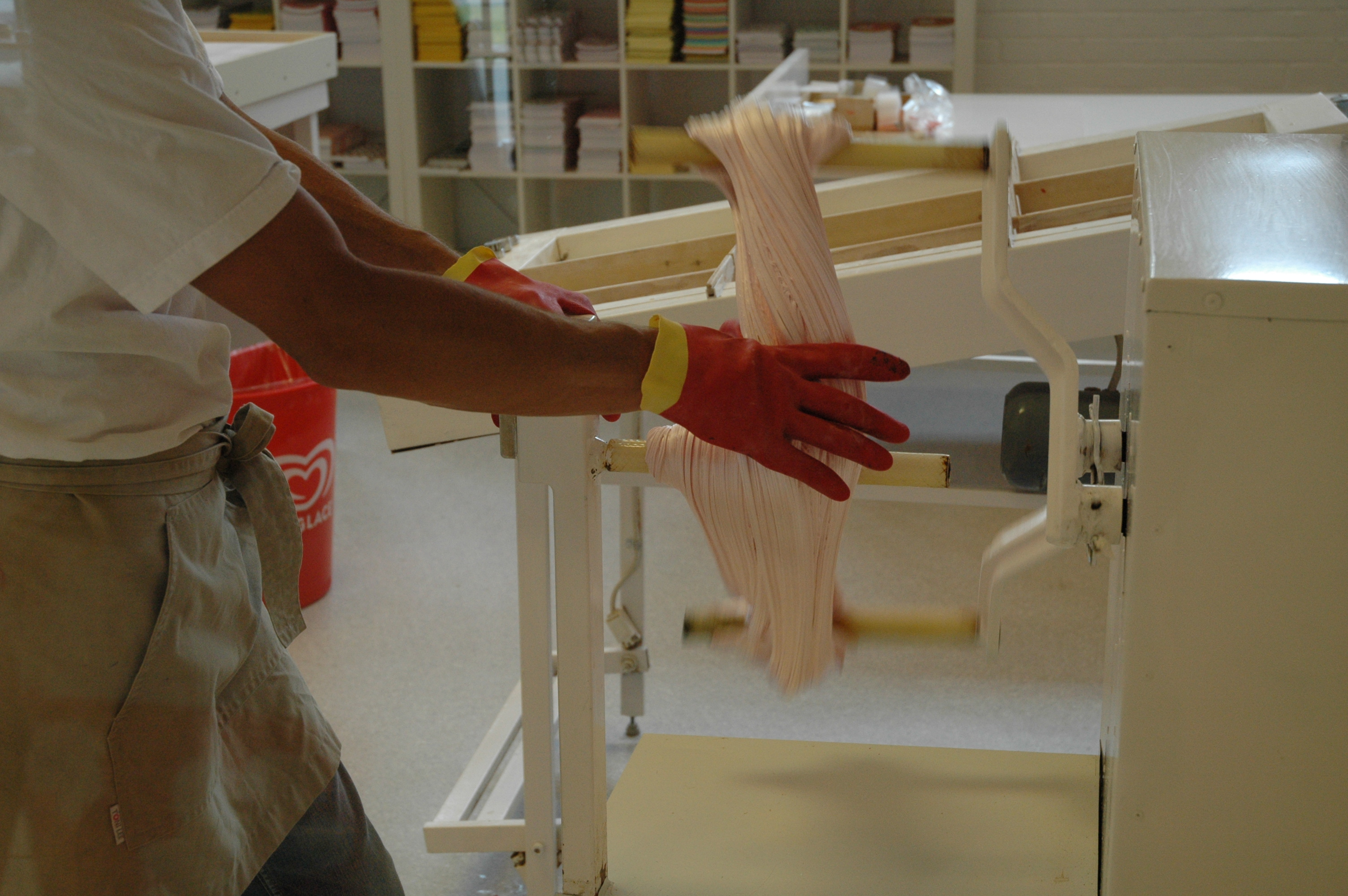
Part of making the polkagris involves stretching the heated sugar before the red stripe is added and the candy is rolled and cut

In recent years, Gränna has arranged an annual world championship in polkagris making as a tourist event. The candy is handmade, and the perfect polkagris should weigh exactly 50 grams. The championship is held every year on 25 July, outdoors, at the Lake Vättern's shore.

A number of polkagris-related records have been registered for the Guinness Book of World Records. The world's longest polkagris (1989) was 287.7 metres (944 ft) long; the tallest polkagris (1993) was 8.67 metres (28.4 ft); the world's heaviest polkagris stick (2003) was 2,158.7 kilograms (4,759 lb).

== See also ==
- Candy cane, a hooked candy stick often associated with Christmas
- Rock (confectionery), a candy stick often associated with British seaside resorts, typically with lettering throughout
