= Stick candy =

Long, cylindrical hard candy

Sticks
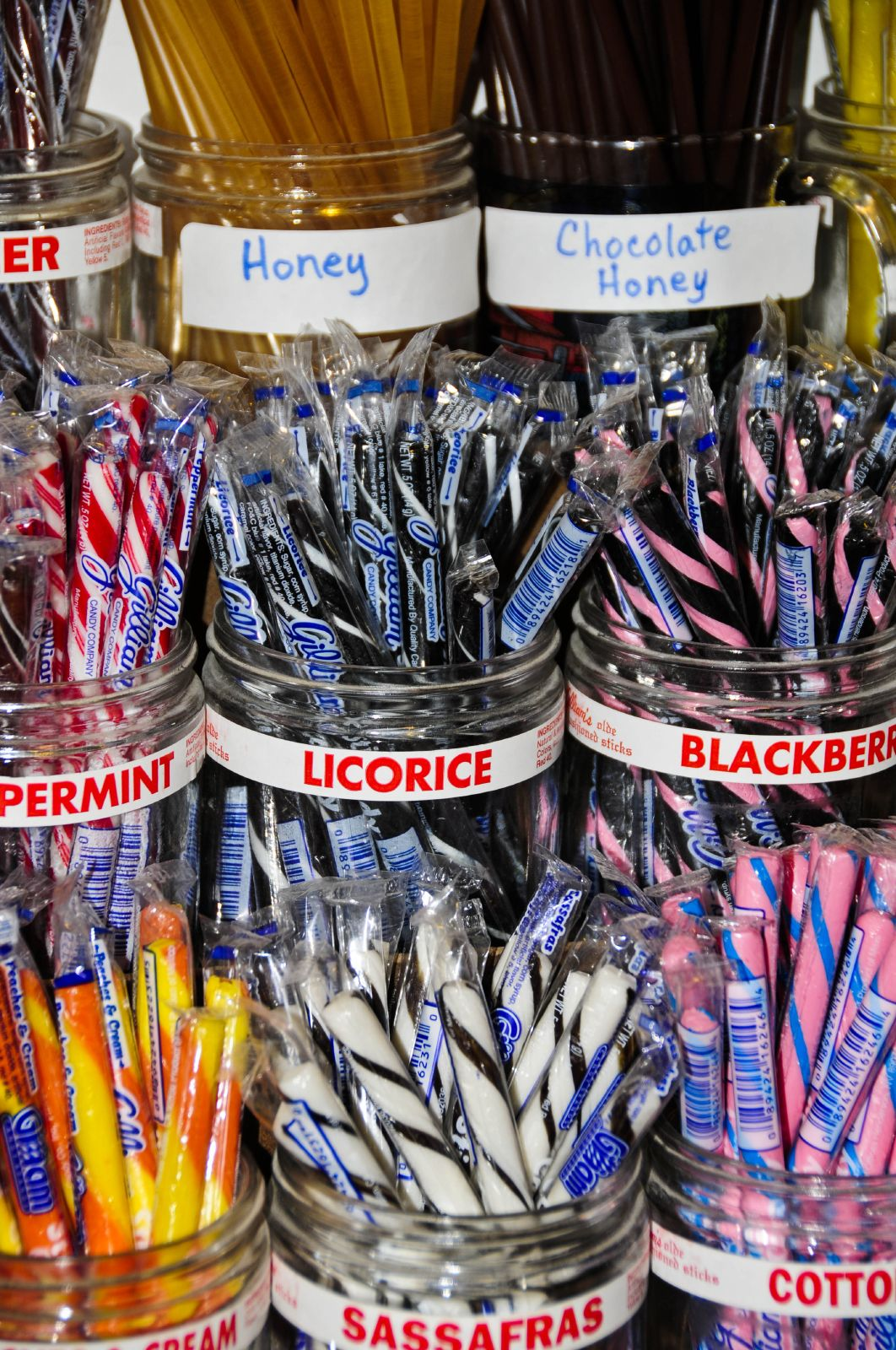
- A variety of flavored stick candy in a store display
- Alternative names: Candy stick, barber pole candy, barber pole
- Type: Hard candy
- Place of origin: United States
- Main ingredients: Sugar, sometimes corn syrup, water, cream of tartar

Stick candy (also called candy stick, barber pole candy, circus stick, or barber pole) is a long, cylindrical variety of hard candy, usually four to seven inches in length and 1/4 to 1/2 inch in diameter, but in some extraordinary cases up to 14 inches in length and two inches in diameter. Like candy canes, they usually have at least two different colors (either opaque or translucent) swirled together in a spiral pattern, resembling a barber's pole.

The candy has a long history in the United States, where it is believed to have been developed, and is often marketed as an "old fashioned" candy. It is often sold in general stores and similar shops specializing in nostalgia items. The Cracker Barrel chain estimates that its stores sell a total length of 940 miles (1,510 km) of stick candy each year.

== History ==
Stick candy has been around since at least the fall of year 1837 when it was shown at the Exhibition of the Massachusetts Charitable Mechanic Association alongside "lobster candy". Stick candy was popular with both children and adults in the U.S. as early as the 1860s, and the selling of this type of candy (particularly during the carnival season in the warmer months) was described as being lucrative. One contemporary account describes broken pieces of stick candy being sold in paper containers, being presented by candy sellers to rural people as something special, and commanding a high price.

Candy sticks were the subject of an 1885 song called "The Candy Stick":

Oh the candy stick striped like a gay barber’s pole,
Was a luscious delight of my infantile soul,
Ev’ry penny I earn’d in my little palm burn’d,
Till away to the store on the corner I stole,
For the candy stick striped like a gay barber’s pole.

Stick candy was the subject of a poem, "Stick-Candy Days", from the 1907 collection A Rose of the Old Regime: And other Poems of Home-Love and Childhood by the Bentztown Bard (Folger McKinsey). The first two verses are:

I want to go back to the stick-candy days,
Before they made bonbons of choc'late and glaze;
I want to go back to the dear little shop
Where the little old lady sold ginger-beer pop,
And made little cookies with raisins, that went
Like lightning because they were two for a cent!

I know the green street where the little shop stood,
And, oh, the stick-candy that tasted so good!
Lemon and wintergreen, cinnamon bar,
Each in its round little, fat little jar—
I see through the glamor of childhood the glint
Of the sassafras, horehound and white peppermint!

Stick candy is also mentioned in a 1909 poem, "The Land of Candy", by Madison Julius Cawein:

First place that they came to, why,
Was a wood that reached the sky;
Forest of Stick Candy. My!
How the little boy made it fly!
Why, the tree trunks were as great,
Big around as, at our gate,
Are the sycamores; the whole
Striped like a barber's pole...

== Production and marketing ==
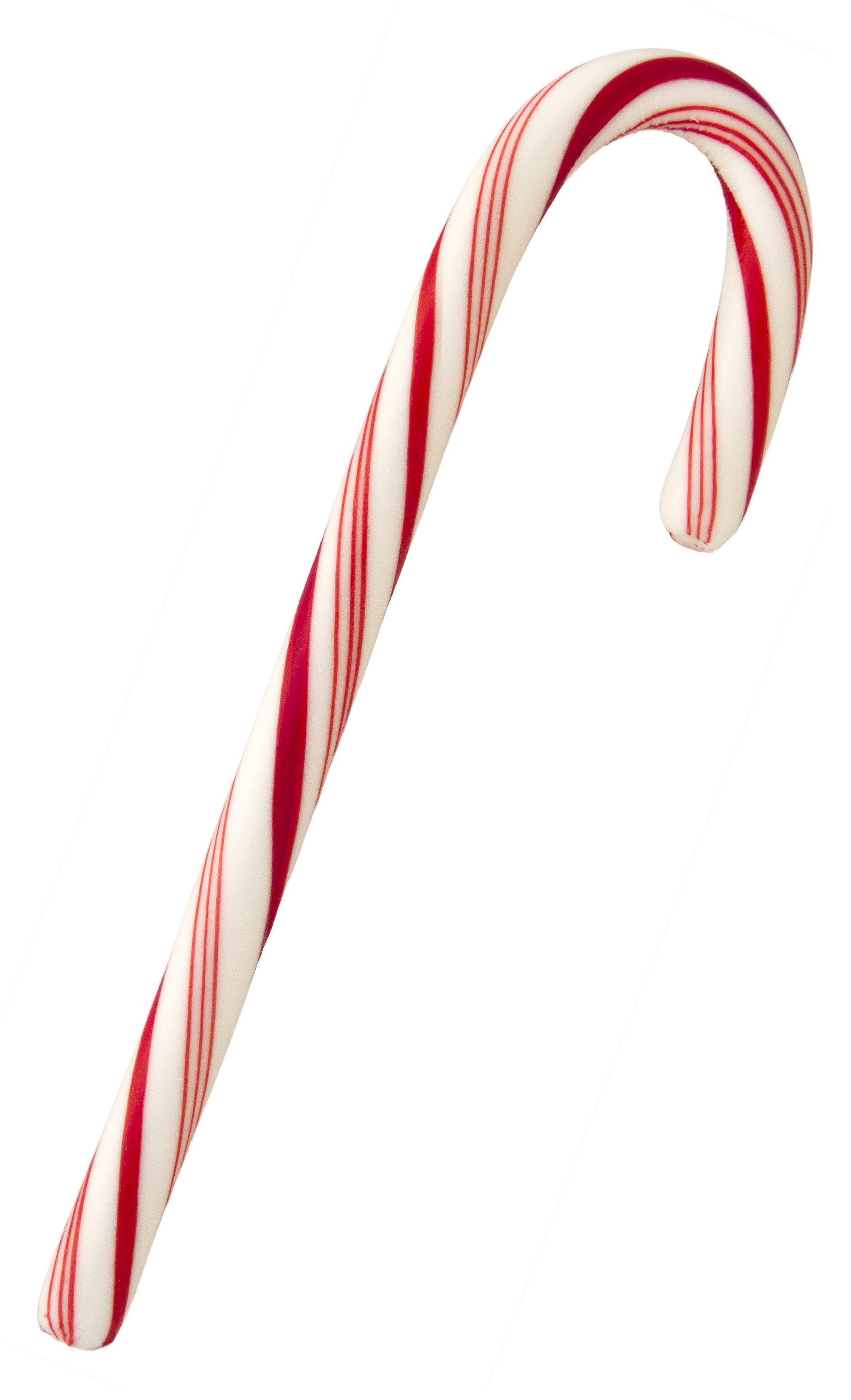
Stick candy can be bent when hardening, making candy canes

Stick candy is produced by mixing granulated sugar (and sometimes also corn syrup) with water and a small amount of cream of tartar. The dough is mixed with color and flavoring, then drawn and twisted, producing the characteristic spiral pattern, and finally cut to the proper length and allowed to cool and harden.

In the 1800s, bright red (and sometimes also bright blue) swirled with white were the most common colors. Although unbent and thicker, it is similar to a candy cane (which retains the aforementioned red-and-white color scheme).

Stick candy is produced in a wide assortment of flavors, such as root beer, sassafras, horehound, cinnamon, butterscotch, piña colada, peppermint, clove, spearmint, licorice, bubble gum, cotton candy, and wintergreen. They are also made in a wide variety of fruit and berry flavors. There are also varieties containing two different flavors swirled together.

Stick candy is generally sold shrink-wrapped in clear plastic, and traditionally displayed for sale in wide-mouthed glass jars. They were originally sold by the piece for a nickel or dime. As of 2008 they more typically sell for 25 cents to 75 cents each, although they are also sold in bulk.

Some varieties of stick candy are filled with sweet cream.

== Consumption ==
As a hard candy, stick candy is slow to dissolve and candy sticks last a very long time if consumed by sucking. As with lollipops, they are most often consumed by sucking, but may also be crushed by the teeth.

Stick candy is sometimes used as an ingredient in other foods: crushed and used in ice cream, pudding or frosting, or cut into thin slices and used as a topping for cakes. It can also be used in other candy, particularly in combination with chocolate.

== See also ==
- Lemon stick
- Polkagris
- Rock candy
- Rock (confectionery)
