= Women's Civic League =

Organization promoting the welfare of the citizens of Baltimore, Maryland,

- Logo with the Washington Monument

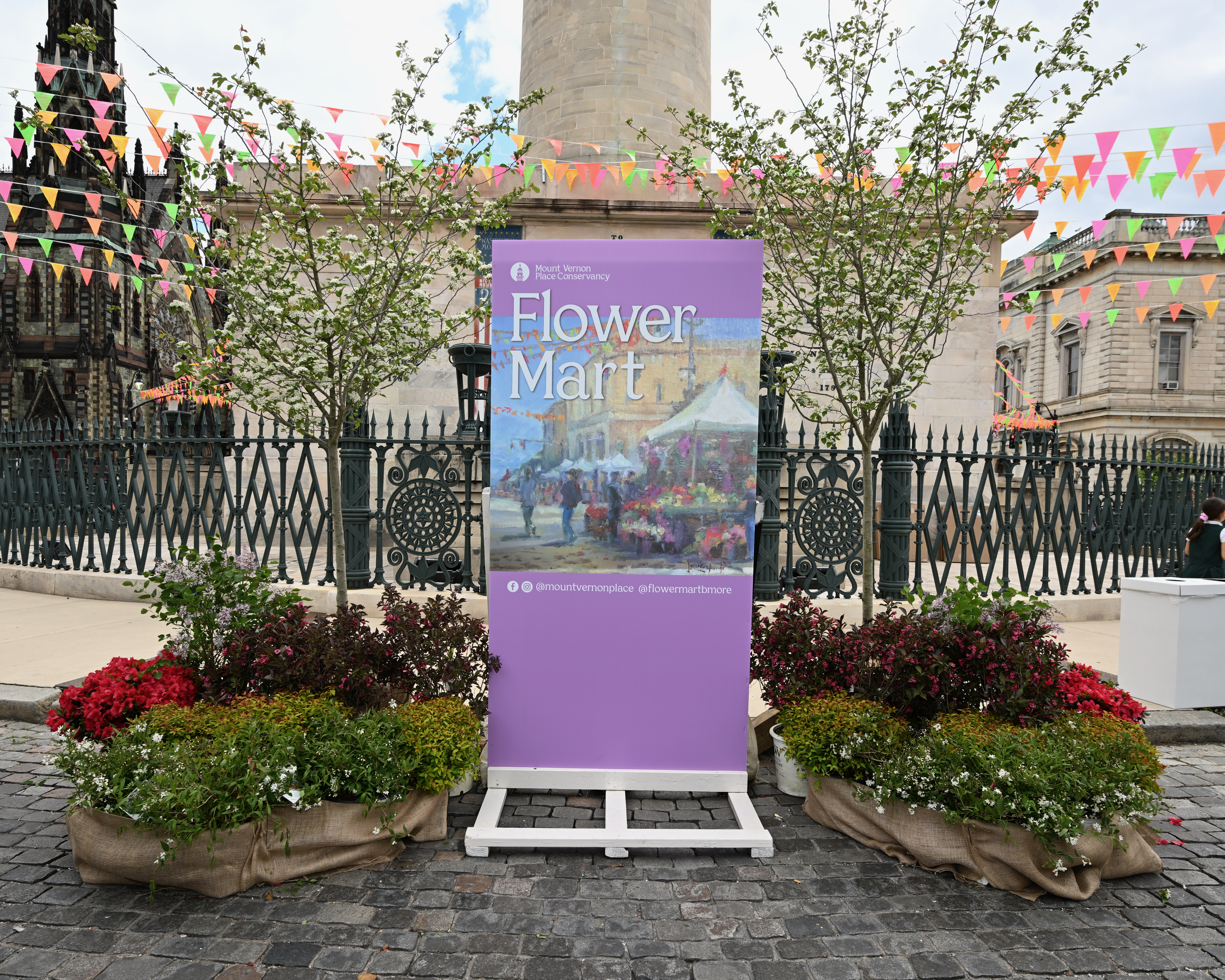
- Flower Mart in Mount Vernon Place, 2023
- Abbreviation: WCL
- Headquarters: 9 North Front Street; Baltimore, Maryland 21202
- Website: womenscivicleague.org

The Women's Civic League is an organization founded in 1911 in Baltimore, Maryland to promote the welfare of the citizens of Maryland, generally, and Baltimore, specifically. Throughout the course of the twentieth century, the League has been involved in grassroots projects that encourage the citizens of Baltimore to organize to rejuvenate their city from the neighborhoods up to the government as well as from the government down. This group spread awareness about issues within the city and encouraged attendance at committee fundraisers through the publication of pamphlets, flyers, and, especially, through updates in the Baltimore Afro-American newspaper.

== Flower Mart ==
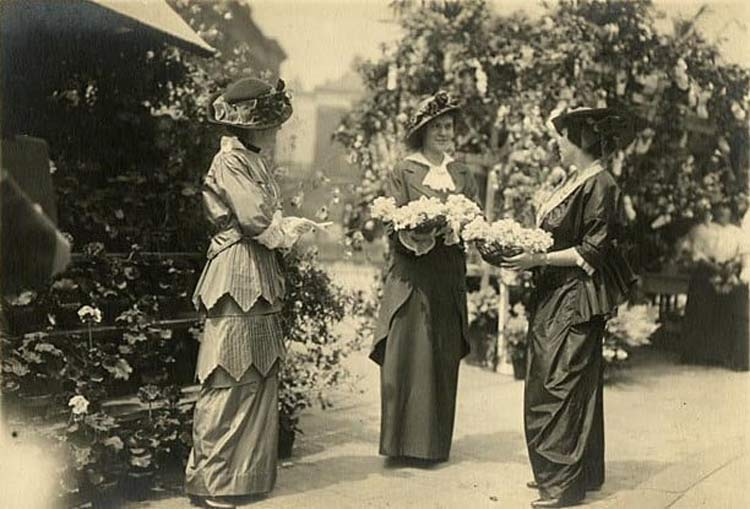
Volunteers at the Flower Mart, circa 1911

One of the most recognized events that the Women's Civic League is known for in Baltimore is the annual Flower Mart held in Mt. Vernon Place in the city's cultural and historical district. The Flower Mart was first held the same year that the League was formed, but it took place before the official founding. Originally, the Home and Garden Committee was responsible for holding the event, which provided fund-raising as well as cultural value.

The Flower Mart became under the control of the League in 1912 when the Home and Garden Committee joined with the newly formed Women's Civic League. This event has been held yearly since its founding with the exception of two years during World War I. It remains today a May tradition in Baltimore, but has expanded to include booths from various committees and organizations around the city.

== Publications ==
The Women's Civic League has made a priority of educating Baltimoreans about the city of Baltimore. Its members have written and published pamphlets that offer reference guides to the city's political leaders, community businesses, and city policies. One of their annual publications is the Know Your City pamphlet that provides readers with a business directory, helpful facts about the city, and lists of locations of parks and landmarks. The preface of the Know Your City pamphlet describes the reason for its publication; the Women's Civic League was founded to improve the welfare of Baltimore citizens. If the life of people in Baltimore is going to change, the League believed, the people needed knowledge. The intent of the pamphlets this organization produced was to spread knowledge to the average Baltimorean about his or her city.

== See also ==
- House at 9 North Front Street
