= Baltimore Flower Mart =

Annual festival in Baltimore, Maryland, US

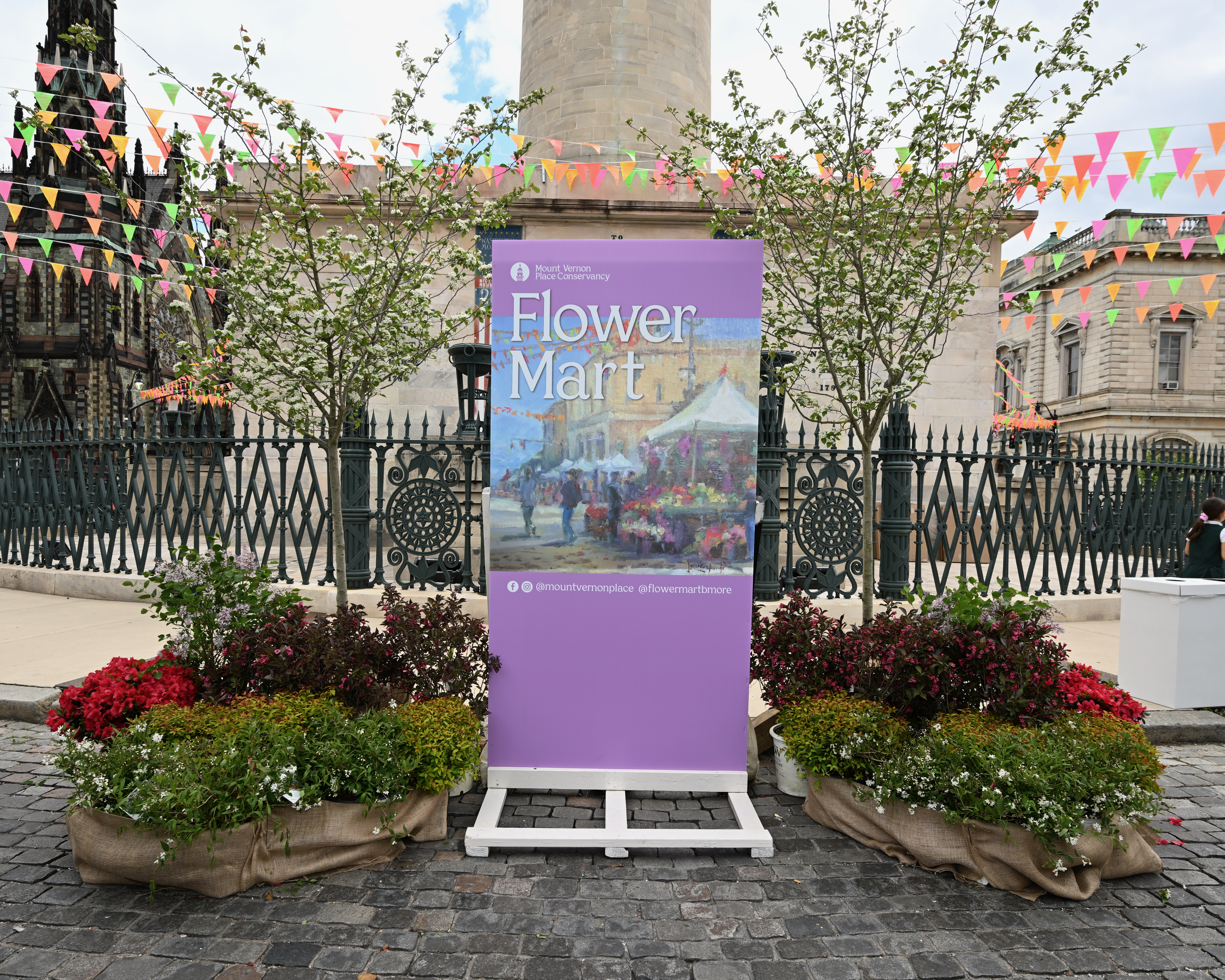
The Flower Mart event in May 2023 in Baltimore

The Flower Mart is an annual festival native to the neighborhood of Mount Vernon in Baltimore, Maryland. The Flower Mart is held each year at the beginning of May. Participants and vendors at the Flower Mart offer gardening tips, sell plants and seedlings, and other gardening-related goods. Along with vendors are various forms of live entertainment and edible treats for guests, such as its traditional lemon sticks. The Flower Mart has produced many annual traditions.

== History ==
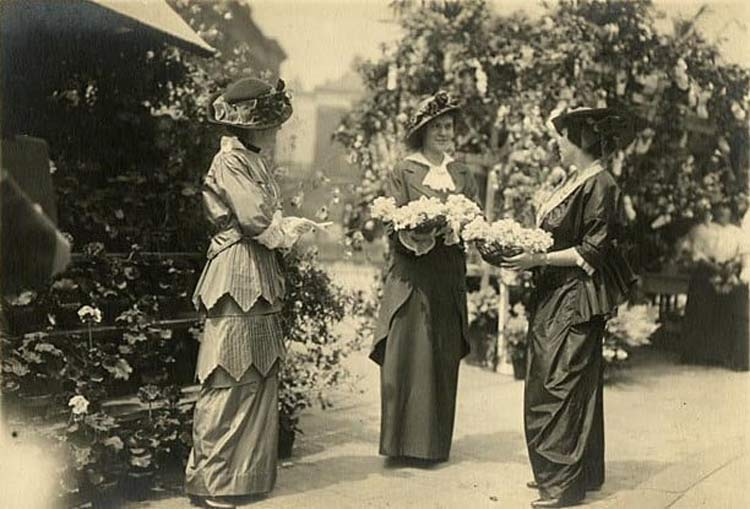
Participants in the Women's Civic League Flower Mart in Baltimore c. 1911.

The first Flower Mart was held in 1911 in Mount Vernon Place around the Washington Monument, in the Mount Vernon area of Baltimore, MD. It was founded by the Women's Civic League. The original mission of the festival was to encourage the growing of flowers and vegetables in home back and fronts yards, as well as on vacant lots. This idea was among many of the goals of the City Beautiful movement in the United States, which encouraged beautifying and fostering more healthy living conditions in urban centers.

In 2000 the Women's Civic League decided not to continue their management of the festival, and the event was taken on by the non-profit Flower Mart at Mount Vernon Place, Ltd. They declared to keep the traditional aspects of the Flower Mart, including its location in Mount Vernon Place. In 2019 the non-profit Mount Vernon Place Conservancy, which manages the Washington Monument and surrounding parks squares of Mount Vernon Place, took over the management of the event. The Conservancy intends to refocus the event on its original "greening" mission, as well as support Baltimore-based vendors.

== Location ==
The annual Baltimore Flower Mart is held in Mount Vernon Place, in the Mount Vernon neighborhood of Baltimore. It has become a tradition since 1911 for the festival to be held in front of the Washington Monument, allowing guest to participate in the festival and to visit shops, restaurants, and museums in the Mount Vernon area. There have been 11 times when the Flower Mart was not held in Mount Vernon. It was canceled from 1939 to 1945 during World War II. Throughout the late 1960s through the early 1970s, the festival was moved from Mount Vernon Place to Charles Center due to the Baltimore Riots. In 1994, the members of the Women's Civic League voted to move the Flower Mart from Mount Vernon Place to the War Memorial Plaza. In May 1995, the 79th annual spring festival was held in War Memorial Plaza, welcoming new guest to the tradition. After the festival was cancelled in 1996, due to discrepancies within the league, the Flower Mart returned to Mount Vernon Place.
