= Candy cane =

Cane-shaped stick candy

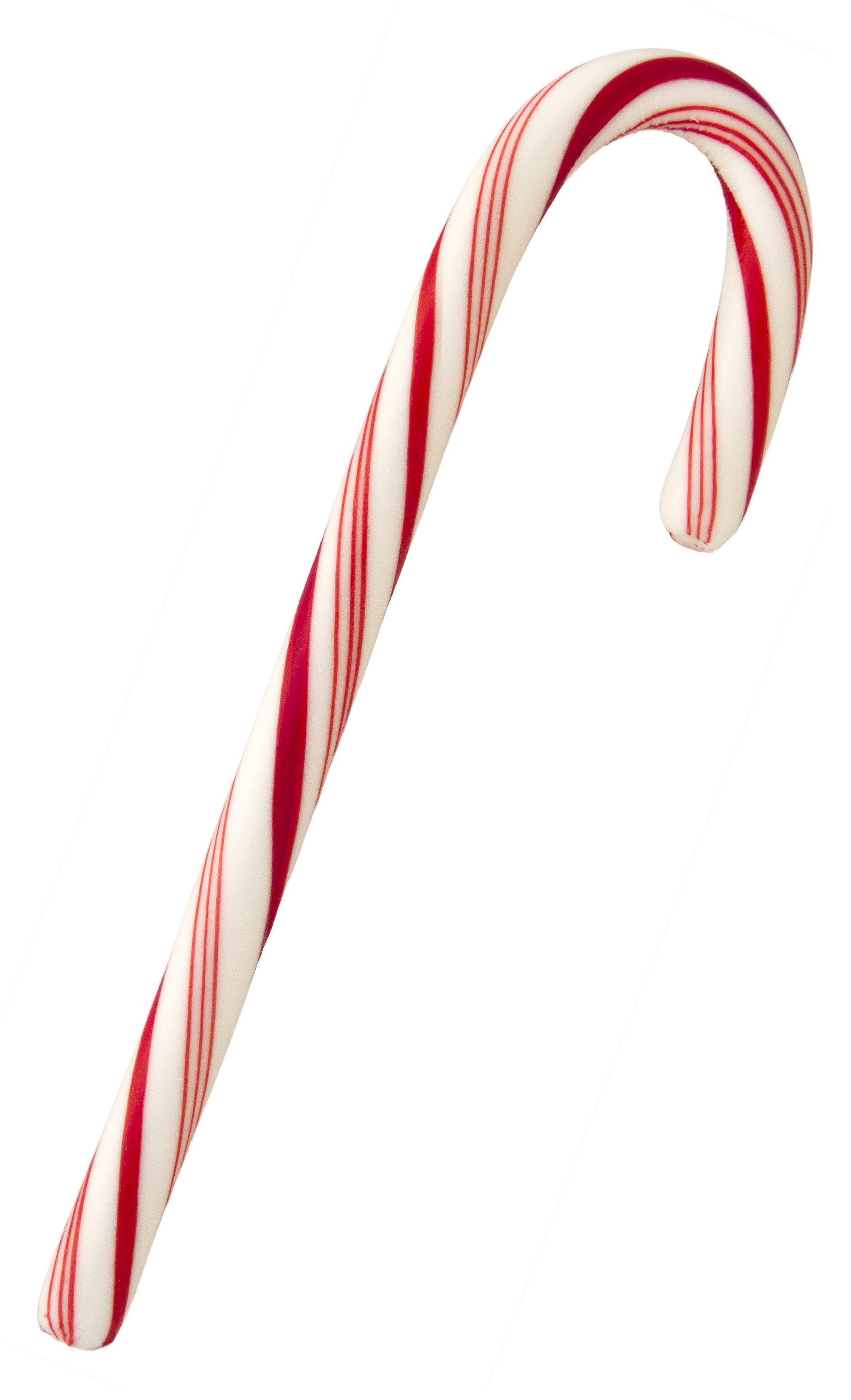
- A traditional candy cane
- Alternative names: Peppermint stick
- Type: Confectionery
- Place of origin: Germany
- Main ingredients: Sugar, flavoring (often peppermint)

A candy cane is a cane-shaped stick candy often associated with Christmastide as well as Saint Nicholas Day. The canes are typically white with red stripes and flavoured with peppermint, but the canes also come in a variety of other flavours and colours.

== History ==
A record of the 1837 exhibition of the Massachusetts Charitable Mechanic Association, where confections were judged competitively, mentions "stick candy". A recipe for straight peppermint candy sticks, white with coloured stripes, was published in The Complete Confectioner, Pastry-Cook, and Baker, in 1844. However, the earliest documentation of a "candy cane" is found in the short story "Tom Luther's Stockings", published in Ballou's Monthly Magazine in 1866. Described as "mammoth" in size, no mention of colour or flavour was provided. The Nursery monthly magazine mentions "candy-canes" in association with Christmas in 1874, and Babyland magazine describes "tall, twisted candy canes" being hung on a Christmas tree in 1882.

=== Animal deterrent ===
Peppermint is a natural animal deterrent. It is believed that peppermint candy canes were originally hung on Christmas trees to keep rodents and other small animals, including cats, from damaging Christmas trees.

=== Religious affiliation ===
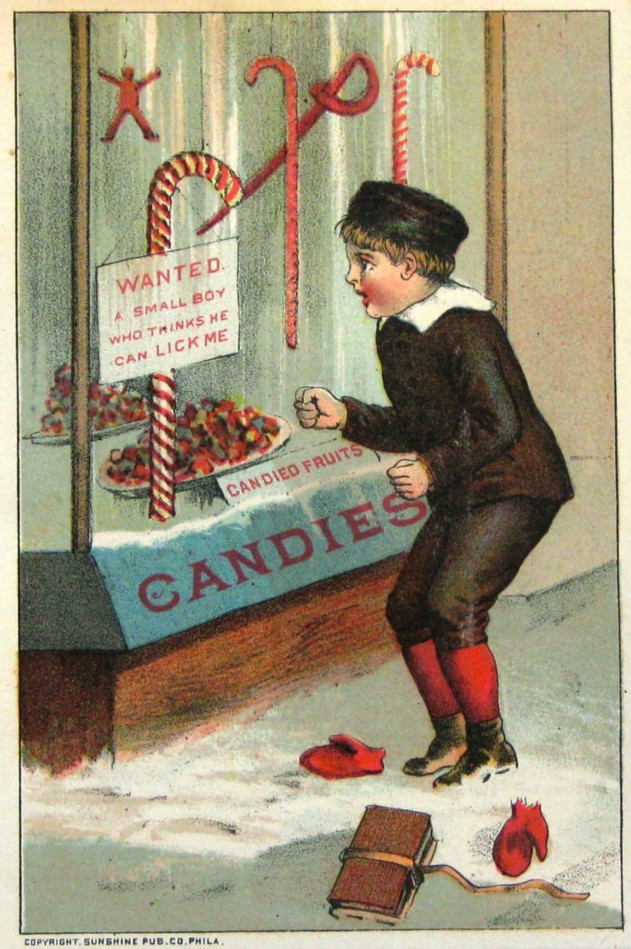
An early 1900s Christmas card image of candy canes

A common story of the origin of candy canes says that in 1670, in Cologne, Germany, the choirmaster at Cologne Cathedral, wishing to remedy the noise caused by children in his church during the Living Crèche tradition of Christmas Eve, asked a local candy maker for some "sugar sticks" for them. In order to justify the practice of giving candy to children during Mass, he asked the candy maker to add a crook to the top of each stick, which would help children remember the shepherds who visited the infant Jesus. In addition, he used the white colour of the converted sticks to teach children about the Christian belief in the sinless life of Jesus. From Germany, candy canes spread to other parts of Europe, where they were handed out during plays reenacting the Nativity. The candy cane became associated with Christmastide. This story is likely apocryphal, with references to it not existing before the mid-20th century.

=== Production ===
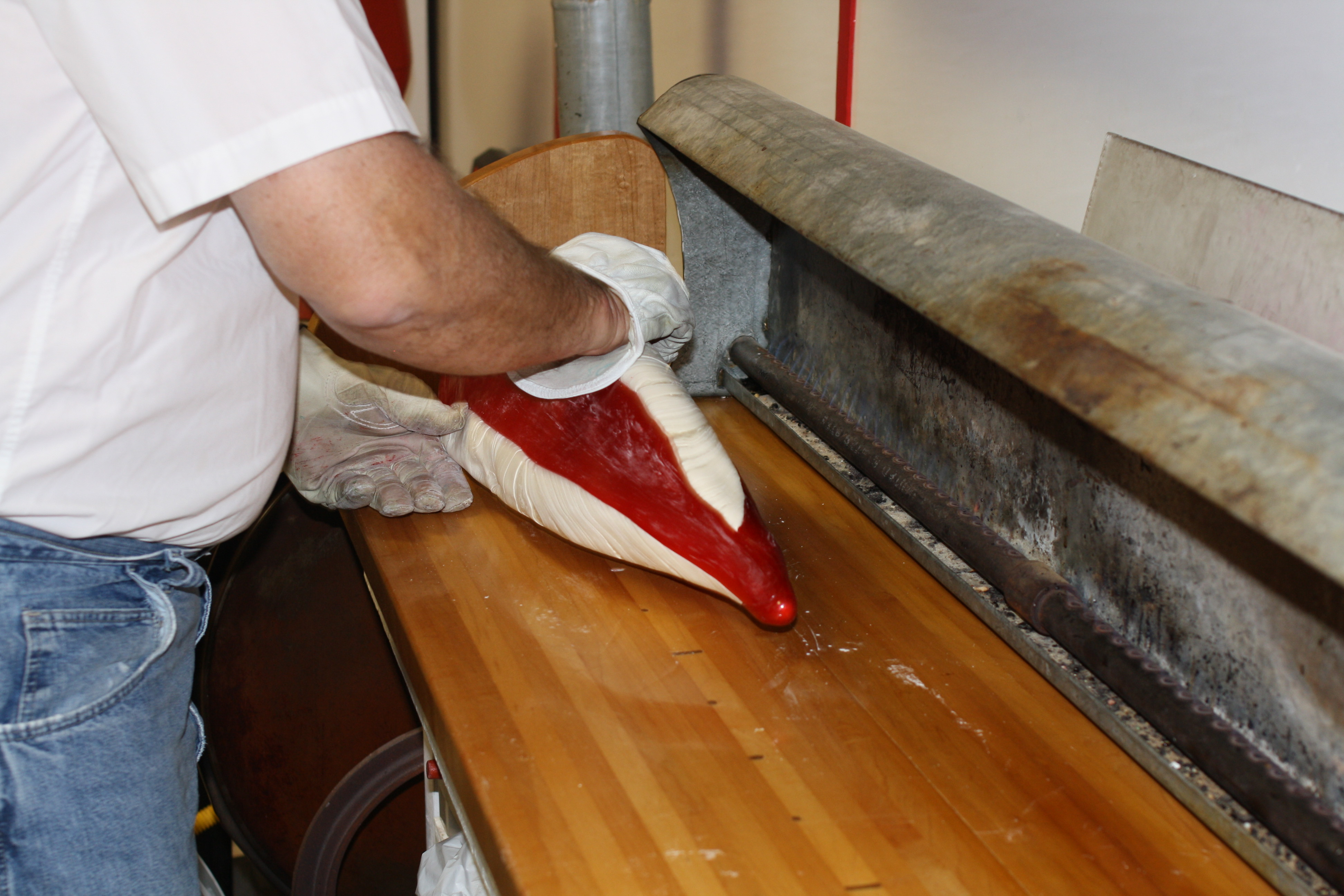
A striped candy cane being made by hand from a large mass of red-and-white sugar syrup

As with other forms of stick candy, the earliest canes were manufactured by hand. Chicago confectioners, the Bunte Brothers, filed one of the earliest patents for candy cane making machines in the early 1920s. Caneworking is a method used originally to create complex designs in long "canes" of glass, by which smaller rods are subsumed into larger rods and subsequently rolled into minute diameters while preserving the design. Examples of this are murrine and millefiori glass ornaments. While candy canes are often shaped into curved walking-style canes, it should be mentioned that the process by which they are made by hand is called candy caning, or candy caneworking. It is fundamentally identical to glass canework, and caneworking is also used with clay polymer.

In 1919, in Albany, Georgia, Robert McCormack began making candy canes for local children, and by the middle of the century, his company (originally the Famous Candy Company, then the Mills-McCormack Candy Company, and later Bobs Candies) had become one of the world's leading candy cane producers. Candy cane manufacturing initially required significant labour that limited production quantities; the canes had to be bent manually as they came off the assembly line to create their curved shape, and breakage often ran over 20 percent. McCormack's brother-in-law, Gregory Harding Keller, was a seminary student in Rome who spent his summers working in the candy factory back home. In 1957, Keller, as an ordained Roman Catholic priest of the Diocese of Little Rock, patented his invention, the Keller Machine, which automated the process of twisting soft candy into spiral striping and cutting it into precise lengths as candy canes.

== Use during Saint Nicholas Day ==
On Saint Nicholas Day celebrations, candy canes are given to children as they are also said to represent the crosier of the Christian bishop Saint Nicholas; crosiers allude to the Good Shepherd, a name sometimes used to refer to Jesus of Nazareth.

== See also ==
- Candy cane sorrel
- Polkagris
- Stick candy
- Rock (confectionery)
