= Axel Oberwelland =

German billionaire heir and businessman

- Born: 1 August 1966 (age 59); Bielefeld, West Germany
- Education: University of St. Gallen
- Known for: Owner, August Storck
- Title: CEO, August Storck
- Term: 2003-
- Spouse: Bergit Oberwelland
- Children: 4
- Relatives: August Oberwelland (great-grandfather)

Axel Oberwelland (born 1 August 1966) is a German billionaire heir and businessman, the owner of the confectionery manufacturer August Storck, founded by his eponymous great-grandfather in 1903. The company is best known for its brands Werther's Original, Riesen and Toffifee.

== Early life ==
Axel Oberwelland was born on 1 August 1966 in Bielefeld, the son of Klaus Oberwelland (born 1937), who took over the company in 1971 and resigned in 2003, and is the grandson of Hugo Oberwelland (1901–1978), who managed the company since 1921.

He went to high school in Bielefeld, followed by a boarding school near St. Moritz, Switzerland, and then studied business at the University of St. Gallen, Switzerland.

== Career ==
He has led the company since his father Klaus Oberwelland retired on Storck's 100th anniversary in 2003.

In April 2018, his net worth was estimated at $3.9 billion.

== Personal life ==
He is married to Bergit Oberwelland (née Reber), with four children, and lives in Berlin, Germany.

He is the brother of film producer Timm Oberwelland (born 1969), husband of businesswoman Anna Oetker-Oberwelland, and the brother of Maike Oberwelland-Height.
