= Oberwelland =

Oberwelland is a surname. Notable people with the surname include:

- Axel Oberwelland (born 1966), German billionaire businessman, owner of confectionery manufacturer August Storck
- August Oberwelland, German entrepreneur and founder of company August Storck
