= Milkfuls =

Brand of hard candy

Milkfuls is a discontinued brand of spherical caramel hard candies made by the German company August Storck KG, based in Berlin, Germany. The candy brand is named for the milky-tasting cream filling which is similar to marshmallow creme. In Germany, the candy is called Vollmilch Brocken.

Except in the United States and Canada, Milkfuls were originally sold under the Werther's brand name.

== See also ==
- List of confectionery brands
