= Moser-Roth =

Brand of German chocolate

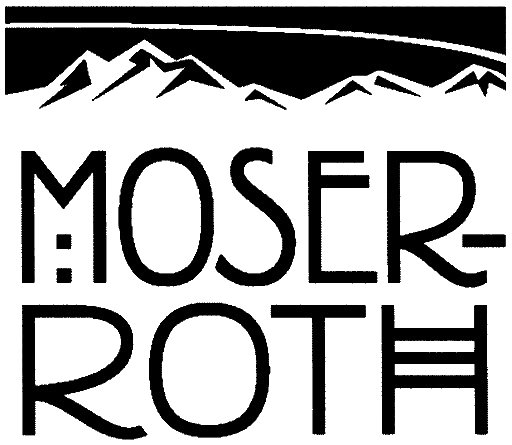
- Product type: Chocolate
- Current owner: August Storck
- Produced by: August Storck
- Country: Germany

Moser-Roth is a brand of German chocolate produced by Storck for both Aldi Nord and Aldi Süd.

== History ==
The Moser-Roth brand name has been transferred several times to different companies.

The original Roth company was founded in 1841, in Stuttgart by pastry chef Wilhelm Roth Jr. In 1876 Roth retired from the company and the small factory was taken over by Wilhelm Wagner and Kommerzienrat Sproesser. In 1881 the company moved to larger premises.

In 1896 the company merged with its Stuttgart competitor E. O. Moser & Cie, which had been founded in 1846 by master confectioner Eduard Otto Moser (1818–1878).

The brand name Moser-Roth was registered in 1902 and the company had the largest chocolate factory in Stuttgart in the 20th century, employing as many as 550 people in about 1910. Other local chocolate companies in Stuttgart at the time until the 1970s included Eszet, Haller (1921-1968, not even popular as Moser-Roth or Ritter Sport, not even sold in stores at all), Waldbaur, Schoko-Buck, Friedel, and Alfred Ritter GmbH & Co. KG, of which only the last is still in existence. Eszet is now made by Sarotti.

Early in 1942 the company was shut down for political reasons by the Nazi Party. In September 1944, the entire factory burned down in an air raid.

Karl Haller of Stuttgart acquired the Moser-Roth brand name in 1947 and in 1948 resumed production in the Obertürkheim section of the city. After his death his obscure Haller company was acquired by Melitta; chocolate production continued until the 1970s, after which the Moser-Roth brand name passed through various owners, being finally sold to Storck. Since June 2007 Storck has produced chocolate for Aldi Nord and Aldi Südat Moser-Roth GmbH, located in the Berlin borough of Reinickendorf. Moser-Roth is Aldi's premium brand of chocolate; it received an award from the German Agricultural Society in 2007.
