= Werther, North Rhine-Westphalia =

Werther (Westf.)
- Town
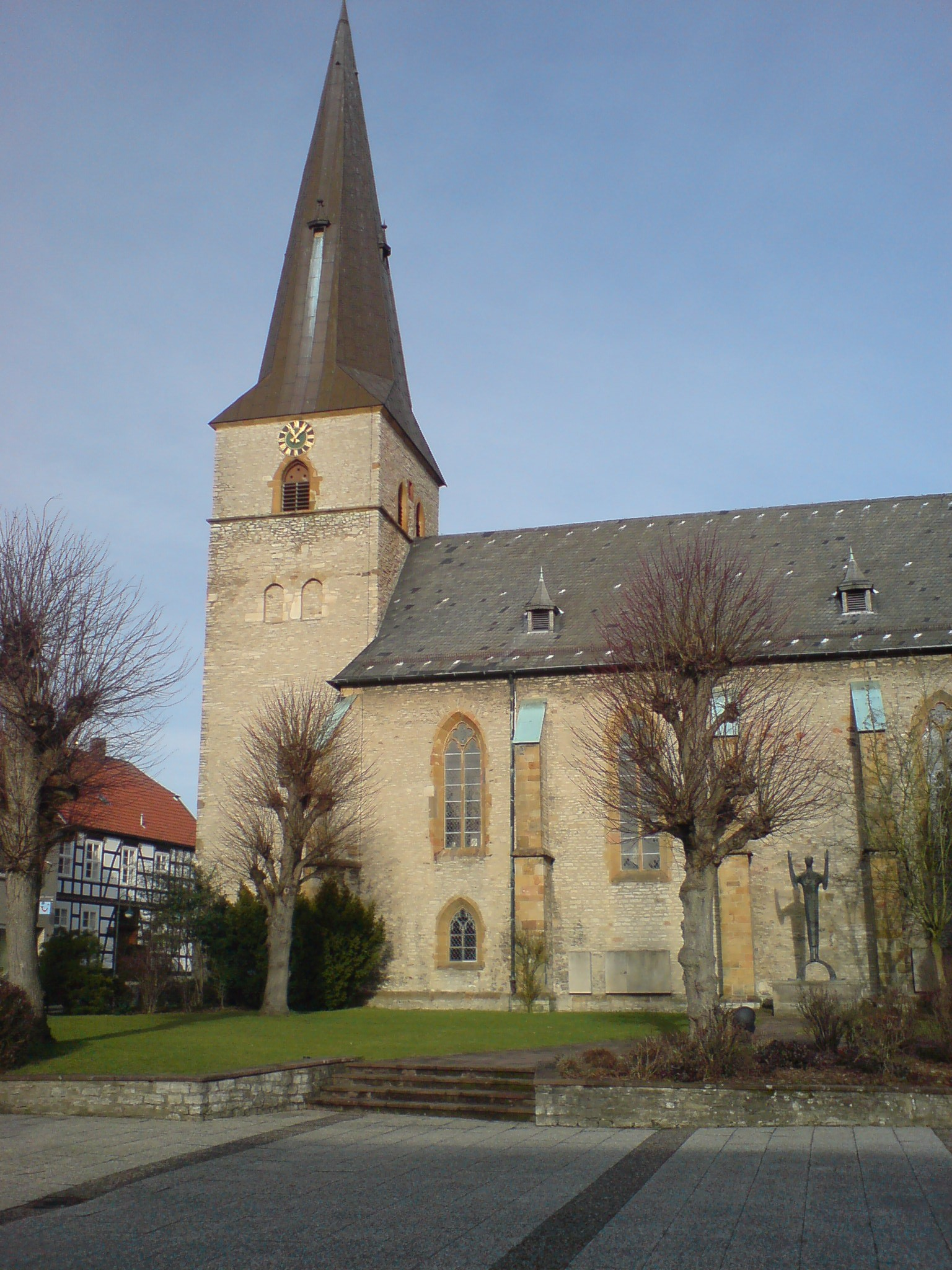
- Protestant St. Jacobi in the centre of Werther

- Flag Coat of arms

- Location of Werther (Westf.) within Gütersloh district
- Interactive map of Werther (Westf.)
- Location within Germany Location within North Rhine-Westphalia
- Coordinates: 52°04′30″N 08°24′45″E
- Country: Germany
- State: North Rhine-Westphalia
- Admin. region: Detmold
- District: Gütersloh
- Subdivisions: 6

Government
  - Mayor (2020–25): Veith Lemmen (SPD)

Area
  - Total: 35.42 km^{2} (13.68 sq mi)
- Elevation: 316 m (1,037 ft)

Population (2025-12-31)
  - Total: 11,001
  - Density: 310.6/km^{2} (804.4/sq mi)
- Time zone: UTC+01:00 (CET)
  - Summer (DST): UTC+02:00 (CEST)
- Postal codes: 33824
- Dialling codes: 05203
- Vehicle registration: GT
- Website: www.stadt-werther.de

Werther (German pronunciation: [ˈveːɐ̯tɐ]) is a town in the district of Gütersloh in the state of North Rhine-Westphalia, Germany. It is located near the Teutoburg Forest, approximately 10 km (6 miles) north-west of Bielefeld. It is best known for the Werther's Original caramel sweets, which are nowadays produced in the nearby city of Halle. Werther has one Gesamtschule and one Gymnasium, which has an exchange partnership with a Yarm School, an independent school in Yarm, England.

== Population ==
Historical population

| Year | Pop. | ±% p.a. |
|---|---|---|
| 1965 | 8,898 | — |
| 1970 | 9,603 | +1.54% |
| 1975 | 9,893 | +0.60% |
| 1980 | 10,225 | +0.66% |
| 1985 | 10,058 | −0.33% |
| 1990 | 10,625 | +1.10% |
| 1995 | 11,268 | +1.18% |

| Year | Pop. | ±% p.a. |
|---|---|---|
| 2000 | 11,653 | +0.67% |
| 2005 | 11,460 | −0.33% |
| 2010 | 11,453 | −0.01% |
| 2015 | 11,418 | −0.06% |
| 2020 | 11,091 | −0.58% |
| 2025 | 11,001 | −0.16% |

Source: Landesdatabank Nordrhein-Westfalen

== People ==
- August Oberwelland (1859–1924), German entrepreneur, August Storck company founder
- Wilhelm Wallbaum (1876–1933), German politician
