= Mingles =

Type of mint chocolate

Mingles were a type of mint chocolate made by Bendicks and sold in the United Kingdom from 2002. The chocolates were all made in the UK in a factory in Winchester. In April 2009, August Storck confirmed it was shutting the factory at the end of July and relocating production to Ohrdruf, its Eastern German plant. This would result in a loss of more than 80 jobs although it would continue to employ over 30 staff in Winchester to support marketing and sales of its brands in the UK.

Following the closure of the plant, Bendicks discontinued the Mingles line in July 2011.

== Varieties ==
There were 5 different varieties of Mingles, which were packaged together in one box with the flavour denoted by coloured wrapper-ends:

- Red - Marbled dark and white chocolate with light mint truffle centre.
- Yellow - Solid milk and white chocolate with a hint of mint.
- Brown - Dark chocolate with a fondant mint centre.
- Green - Milk chocolate mint crisp.
- Blue - Marbled milk and white chocolate with dark mint truffle centre.

The varieties of Mingles were changed for Christmas 2007, and were then:

- Red - Dark chocolate mint crisp.
- Yellow - Solid milk and white chocolate with a hint of mint.
- Brown - Dark chocolate with a fondant mint centre.
- Green - Milk chocolate mint crisp.
- Blue - Milk chocolate with a dark mint truffle centre.

They could either be bought in a standard carton box, or a tall cylindrical tin. All of which were green.
