= Campino (candy) =

Brand of hard candy

Campino is a variety of hard candy made by August Storck KG. It is made using a combination of yogurt and fruits which have varied since the product's launch in 1966. Up until 2007 only two varieties were available; strawberry and summer fruits (a mixed bag of raspberry, blackcurrant, and peach), however strawberry, cherry, and peach are also available. They have been discontinued worldwide.

== See also ==
- List of confectionery brands
