= Aldi Süd =

Southern German multinational discount supermarket chain

- Aldi Süd logo since 2017

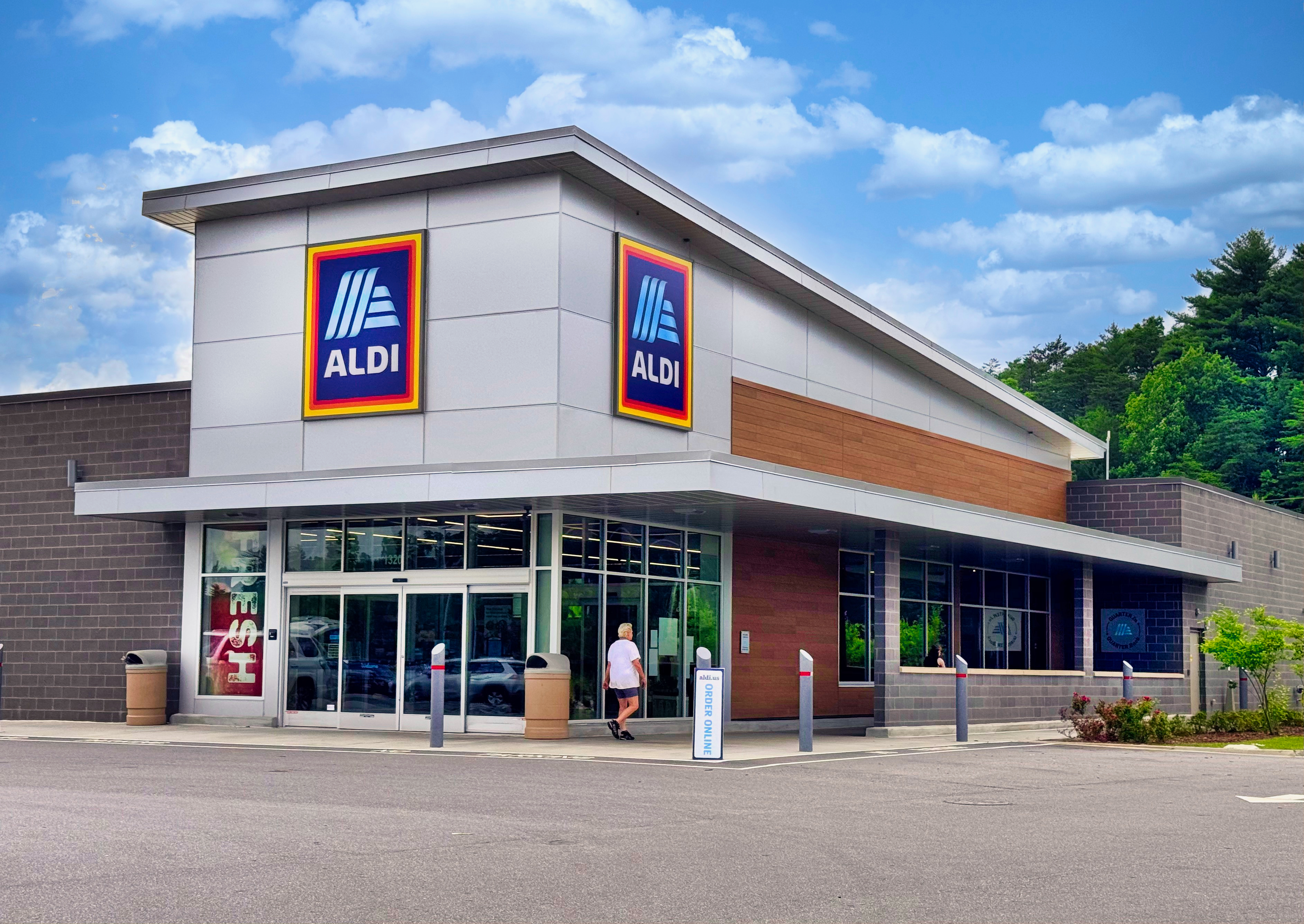
- Aldi Süd in Franklin, North Carolina, U.S.
- Type: Private
- Industry: Retail
- Founded: 1961; 65 years ago 1961
- Founders: Karl Albrecht
- Headquarters: Mülheim, Germany (Aldi Süd)
- Number of locations: 7963 (2026)
- Area served: Europe: Germany United Kingdom (Great Britain only) Ireland Hungary Italy Switzerland Austria Slovenia; United States; Australia; China
- Products: Groceries; Consumer goods
- Revenue: Aldi Süd: ▲89 billion € (2024)
- Number of employees: Aldi Süd: 203,146 (2024)
- Subsidiaries: Hofer; Winn-Dixie
- Website: aldi.com www.aldi-sued.de

Aldi Süd (German pronunciation: [ˈaldiː], stylised in all caps) also referred to as Aldi is a Southern German multinational family-owned discount supermarket chain operating over 7,900 stores in 11 countries. The business was founded by brothers Karl and Theo Albrecht in 1946, when they took over their mother's store in Essen.

The enterprise was split into two separate groups in 1960 that later became Aldi Nord (initially operating in northern West Germany), headquartered in Essen, and Aldi Süd (initially operating in southern West Germany), headquartered in neighboring Mülheim. As the business expanded internationally, the two divisions maintained this separation, dividing global markets between them, with the exception of the United States, where both operate: Aldi Süd under the Aldi name, while Aldi Nord owns Trader Joe's.

In 1962, they introduced the name Aldi (a syllabic abbreviation for "Albrecht Diskont"). In Germany, Aldi Nord and Aldi Süd have been financially and legally separate since 1966, although they may appear to operate as a single enterprise with certain store brands or when negotiating with contractor companies.

Aldi Süd and sister company Aldi Nord are the main competitors of the German discount chain Lidl in most markets.

== Ownership ==
=== Aldi Süd ===
Aldi Süd is owned by three private family foundations: the Siepmann-Stiftung (75%), and the Oertl-Stiftung and Elisen-Stiftung (together 25%), under a structure known as a Doppelstiftungsmodell (lit. 'dual-foundation ownership model'). These foundations are based in Eichenau, Bavaria.

The foundations' assets include Aldi Süd's operations in Germany, organised into 24 regional companies, and international subsidiaries in Australia, Austria, China, Hungary, Ireland, Italy, Slovenia, Switzerland, the United Kingdom, and the United States. The group owns its headquarters in Mülheim, office and warehouse facilities, the Öschberghof hotel in Donaueschingen, and more than 5,000 store properties worldwide. The group has been described as having little or no debt.

== History ==
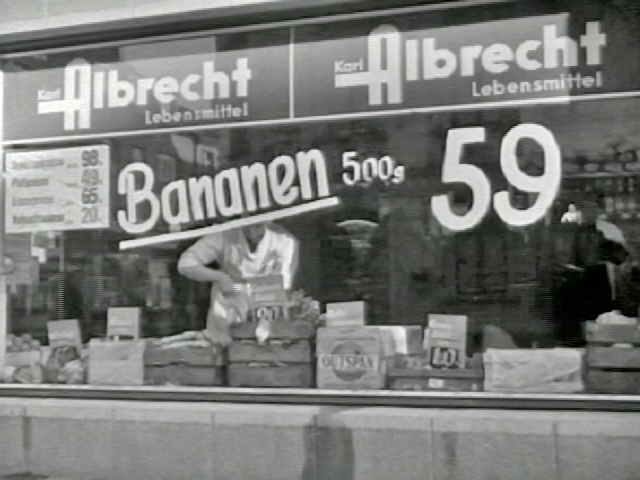
Albrecht grocery store in Essen-Schonnebeck, 1958

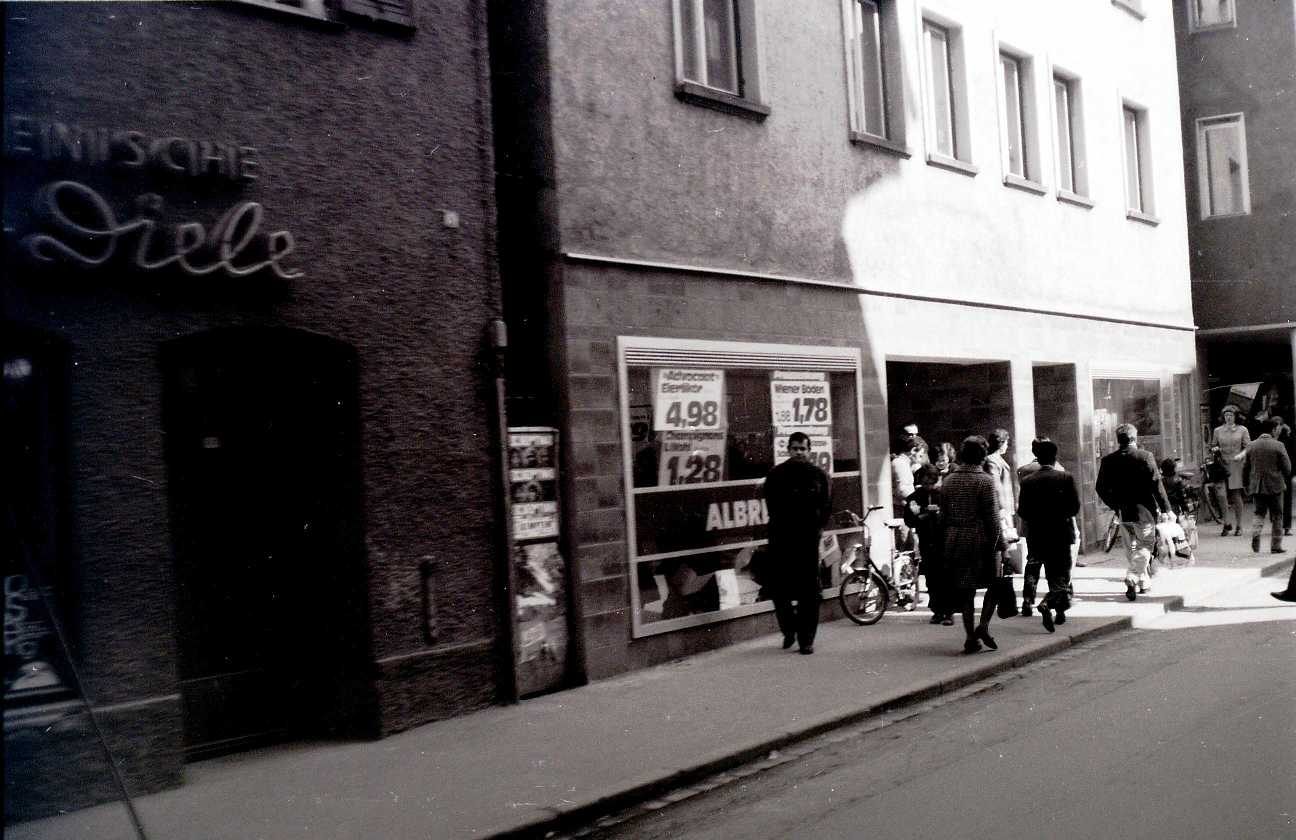
Aldi grocery store in Memmingen, c. 1968

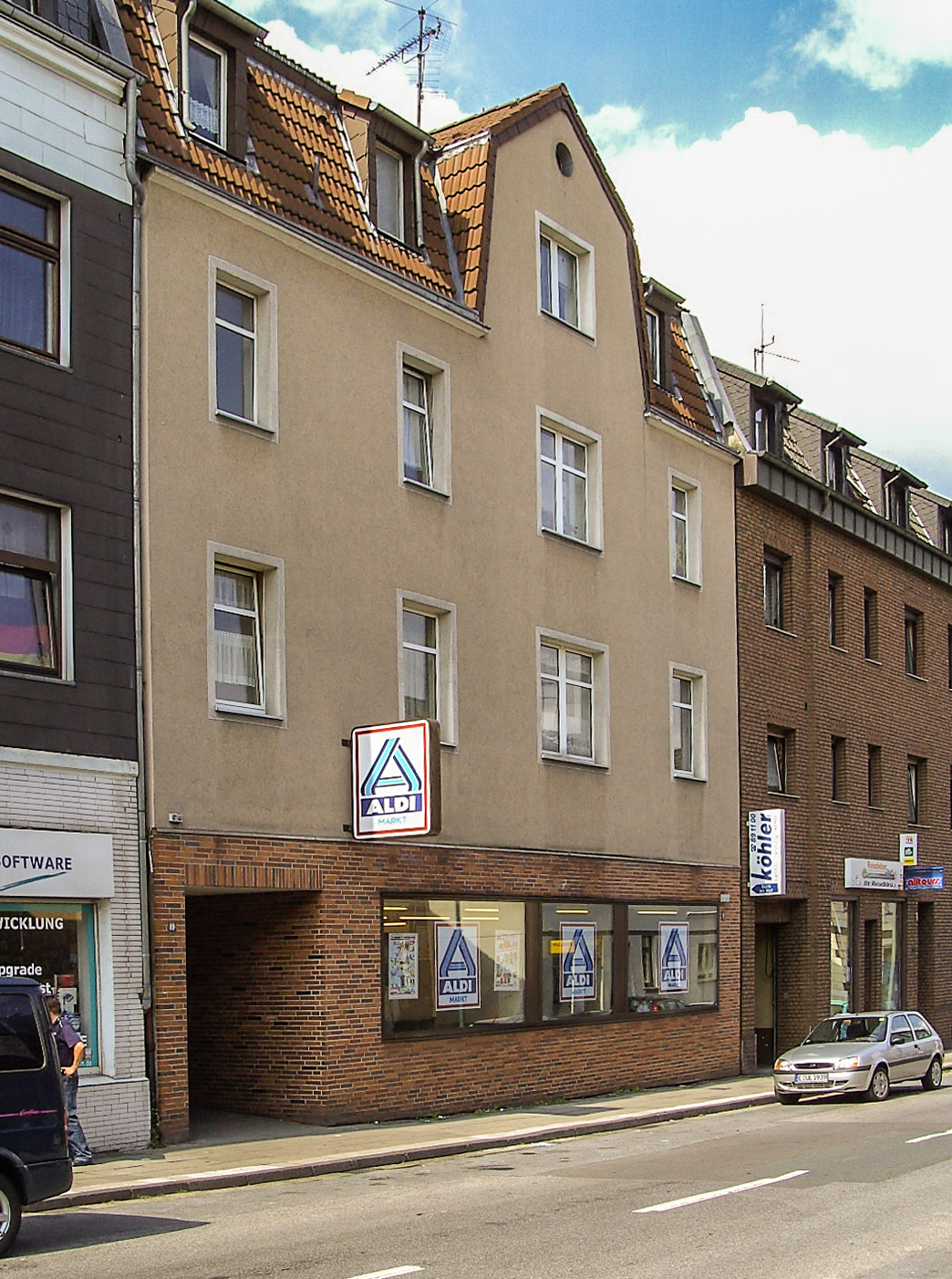
Aldi's original store at Huestraße 89 in Essen, is pictured in September 2006. This location closed in 2020.

In 1913, Karl and Theo Albrecht's mother opened a small store in a suburb of Essen, Germany. Their father was employed as a miner and, after asthma forced him to quit that job, later found work as a baker's assistant. Karl and Theo were born in 1920 and 1922, respectively. Theo Albrecht completed an apprenticeship in his mother's store, while Karl Albrecht worked in a delicatessen.

Karl Albrecht took over a food shop seized from Jewish grocer F. W. Judt, and he later served in the German Army during World War II. In 1945, the brothers took over their mother's business and soon opened another retail outlet nearby. By 1950, the Albrecht brothers owned 13 stores in the Ruhr Valley.

The brothers' idea was to subtract the legal maximum rebate of 3% before sale. The market leaders at the time, which often were co-operatives, required their customers to collect rebate stamps and to send them at regular intervals to reclaim their money. The Albrecht brothers also rigorously removed merchandise that did not sell from their shelves, cutting costs by neither advertising nor selling fresh produce, and keeping the size of their retail outlets small. By 1960, 300 stores were in Germany.

=== Split ===
The brothers split the company in 1960, reportedly over a dispute about whether they should sell cigarettes. The split led to Theo running Aldi Nord and Karl running Aldi Süd. At the time, they jointly owned 300 shops. Journalist Martin Kuhna, however, questioned said reason for the split in an article published by the Westdeutsche Allgemeine Zeitung in September 2009, where he suspected that the real reason for the split lay in the vastly differing management styles of the brothers. In 1962, they introduced the name Aldi—short for Albrecht-Diskont, which translates into English as Albrecht Discount, which became their formal corporate name in 1975. Aldi Nord and Aldi Süd have been financially and legally separate since 1966.

After German reunification and the fall of the Iron Curtain, Aldi experienced a rapid expansion. The brothers retired as CEOs in 1993. Control of the companies was placed in the hands of private family foundations, the Siepmann Foundation for Aldi Süd, and the Markus, Jakobus, and Lukas Foundation Aldi Nord.

=== International expansion ===
In 1967, Aldi expanded internationally by acquiring the grocery store chain Hofer in Austria. In 1976, Aldi opened its first store in the United States in Iowa. (Note: Aldi purchased Iowa's Benner Tea chain and opened its first United States store in Burlington, Iowa, in 1976.)

In August 2023, Aldi Süd agreed to acquire about 400 Winn-Dixie and Harveys Supermarket locations across the southeastern United States, completing the acquisition on 7 March 2024. In February 2025, Aldi sold 170 of the stores back to Southeastern Grocers in a deal involving its former leadership and C&S Wholesale Grocers. At the same time, Aldi said it would still convert around 220 Winn-Dixie and Harveys locations to its own format by 2027, operating them under existing brands under license until conversion is complete.

== Business organisation ==
=== Germany ===
Aldi in Germany

Aldi Süd is made up of 24 companies with around 2,000 stores. The border between Aldi Süd and Aldi Nord is commonly known as the Aldi-Äquator (lit. 'Aldi equator') and runs from the Rhine via Mülheim an der Ruhr, Wermelskirchen, Marburg, Siegen, and Gießen east to just north of Fulda.

The former East Germany is served by Aldi Nord, except for one Aldi Süd in Sonneberg, Thuringia, whose regional office is in Bavaria. The regional branches are organised as limited partnerships, with a regional manager for each branch, who reports directly to the head office in Mülheim an der Ruhr for Aldi Süd.

=== Internationally ===
Distribution of Aldi in Europe as of 2023: Aldi Nord Aldi Süd

The Aldi group operates over 12,000 stores worldwide.

Aldi Süd operates stores in Southern Germany, Australia, China, Ireland, the United Kingdom (not in Northern Ireland), the United States, and through Austrian subsidiary Hofer AG in Austria, Hungary, Italy, Slovenia, and Switzerland. Aldi Süd and Aldi Nord only compete in the United States, where Aldi Süd operates Aldi us and Aldi Nord operates Trader Joe’s.

In Austria and Slovenia, Aldi Süd operates its stores under the Hofer brand. Aldi Süd's first Swiss store opened in 2005, and it has operated in Hungary since 2007. Aldi Süd had invested an estimated €800m (US$1bn; £670m) in Greece from November 2008 until pulling out in December 2010. The first Aldi stores opened simultaneously on 13 November 2008 in Aridaia, Vrasna, Giannitsa, Kalamaria, Larissa, Serres, and Stavroupoli. The untimely investment in expensive real estate at that period, the economic crisis that immediately followed, as well as the dominance of Lidl, contributed to their short-lived presence in the Greek market. They withdrew permanently in July 2010.

Aldi UK market share to 2015

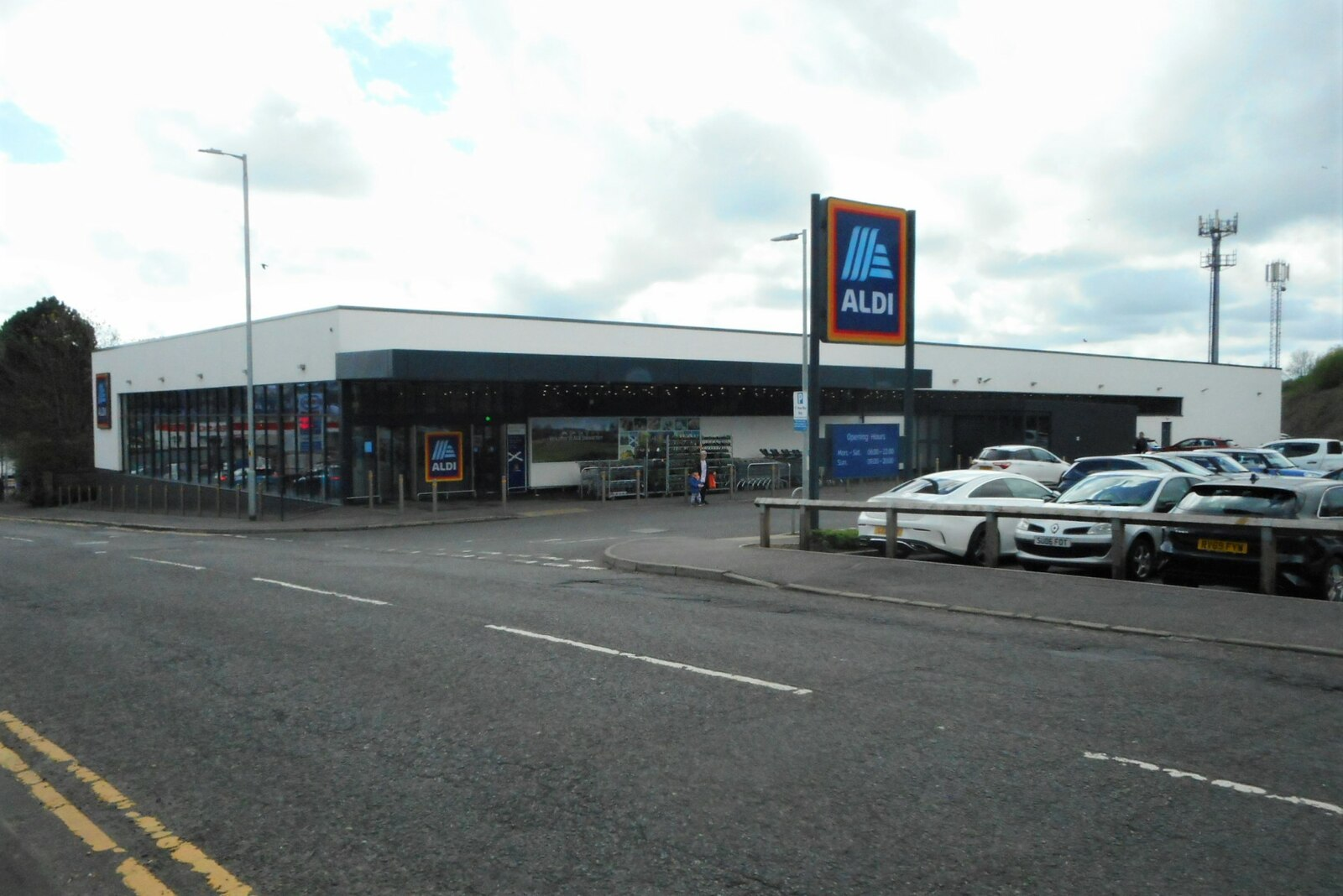
Aldi Süd in Stewarton, Scotland

Aldi launched in the United Kingdom on 5 April 1990, when it opened its first store in Stechford, Birmingham, using the wholly owned English-registered company of Aldi Stores Limited. In 1994, it opened its first store in Scotland in Kilmarnock. In October 2013, Aldi opened its 300th store in the UK. By 2017, Aldi was opening UK stores at a rate of more than one a week. In January 2022, Aldi launched its Shop&Go concept in Greenwich, London. In September 2022 Aldi overtook Morrisons to become Britain's 4th largest supermarket, with a 9.3% market share. In September 2023, Aldi opened its 1,000th location in the UK and shared its plan to open another 500 as a long-term goal.

Aldi entered the Irish market in 1999. In October 2025, its 165th store in Ireland opened in Monaghan Town (County Monaghan), serving its one billionth customer.

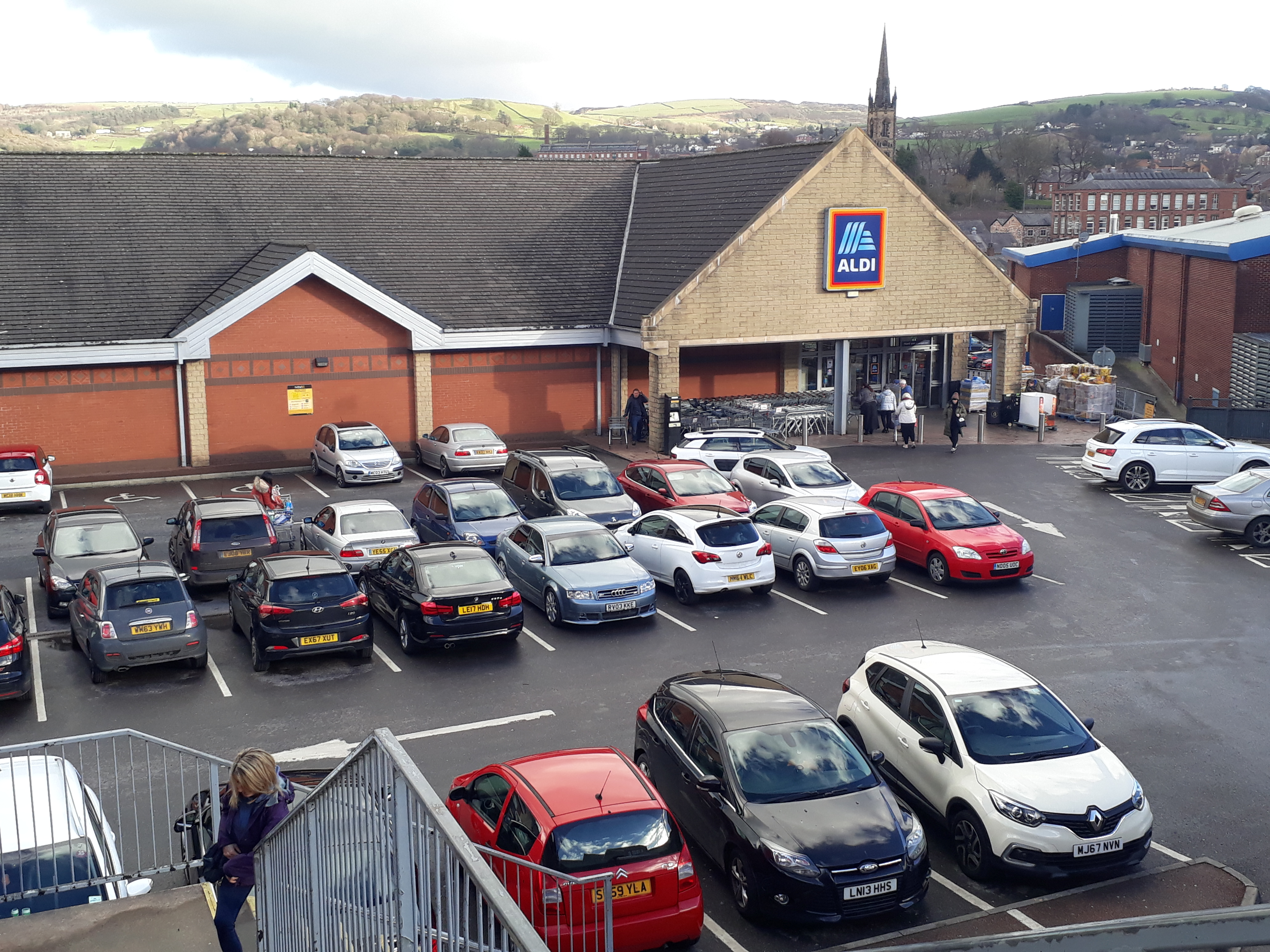
An ALDI Süd store in Macclesfield, UK

Aldi opened its first Australian store in Sydney in 2001 and has grown rapidly since, maintaining a 12.6% market share as of early 2016. It has yet, as of 2024, to open any stores in the state of Tasmania and in Northern Territory. Financial website Canstar rated Australia's supermarkets based on the feedback of 2,897 consumers who had visited one in the past month with Aldi coming out on top. By August 2019, there were 540 Aldi stores in Australia. Aldi had approximately 11 percent share of the Australian grocery market in 2018.

Aldi Süd expanded to the United States under the Aldi banner, having expanded throughout the Eastern and Midwestern US. Aldi Süd revealed expansion plans in 2015, and it expanded into the Southern Californian market, where Aldi Nord's Trader Joe's is based. Reports in August 2019 stated that the company was in the process of using a $3.4 billion investment to expand to 2,500 stores in the country by the end of 2022. It also invested an extra $1.6 billion to renovate 1,300 of its US stores.

By October 2024, 2,428 Aldi Süd stores were in 39 US states. Groceries ordered online could be delivered to homes in the areas covered by 95% of stores in the US, provided in conjunction with Instacart. In March 2024, Aldi said that it is planning to invest over $9 billion and open 800 new stores in the United States by the end of 2028.

Aldi Süd opened its first 10 stores in Italy in March 2018. In the first year of operation, 51 outlets were opened. By October 2019, 66 stores were in northern Italy. At that time, the company was planning to open 80 new stores in the country, as well as a distribution centre in Landriano.

In mid-2019, Aldi Süd opened two small, upscale stores in Shanghai. Two more were opened in late 2019. This is the first of a planned 100 such locations in China. By March 2026, the 100th store had open in China.

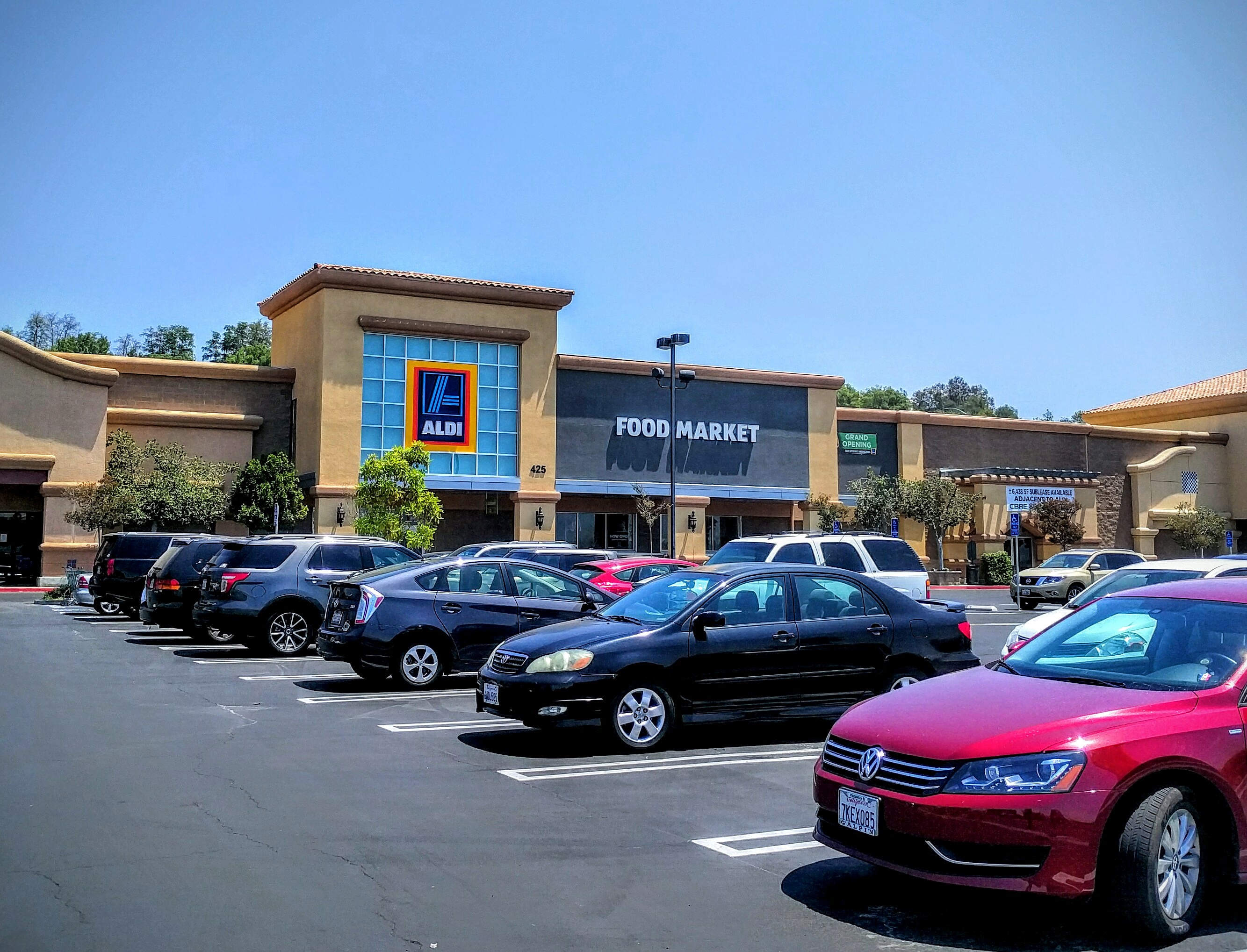
New style of Aldi Süd in Simi Valley, California, US

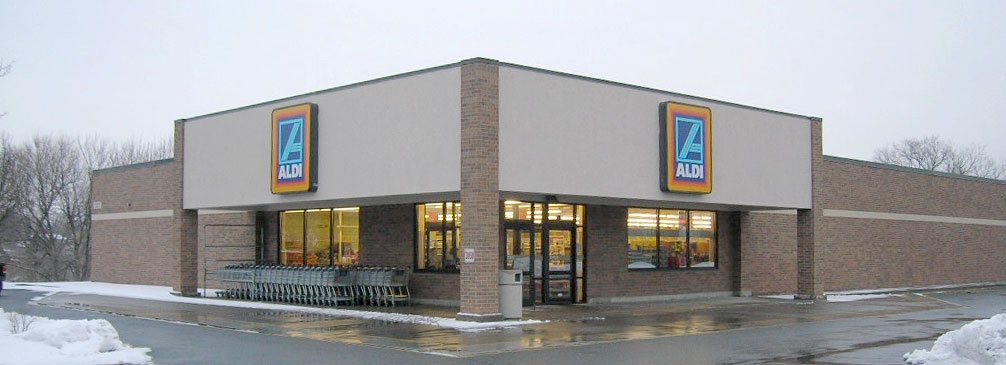
Old style of Aldi Süd in Bethlehem, Pennsylvania, US

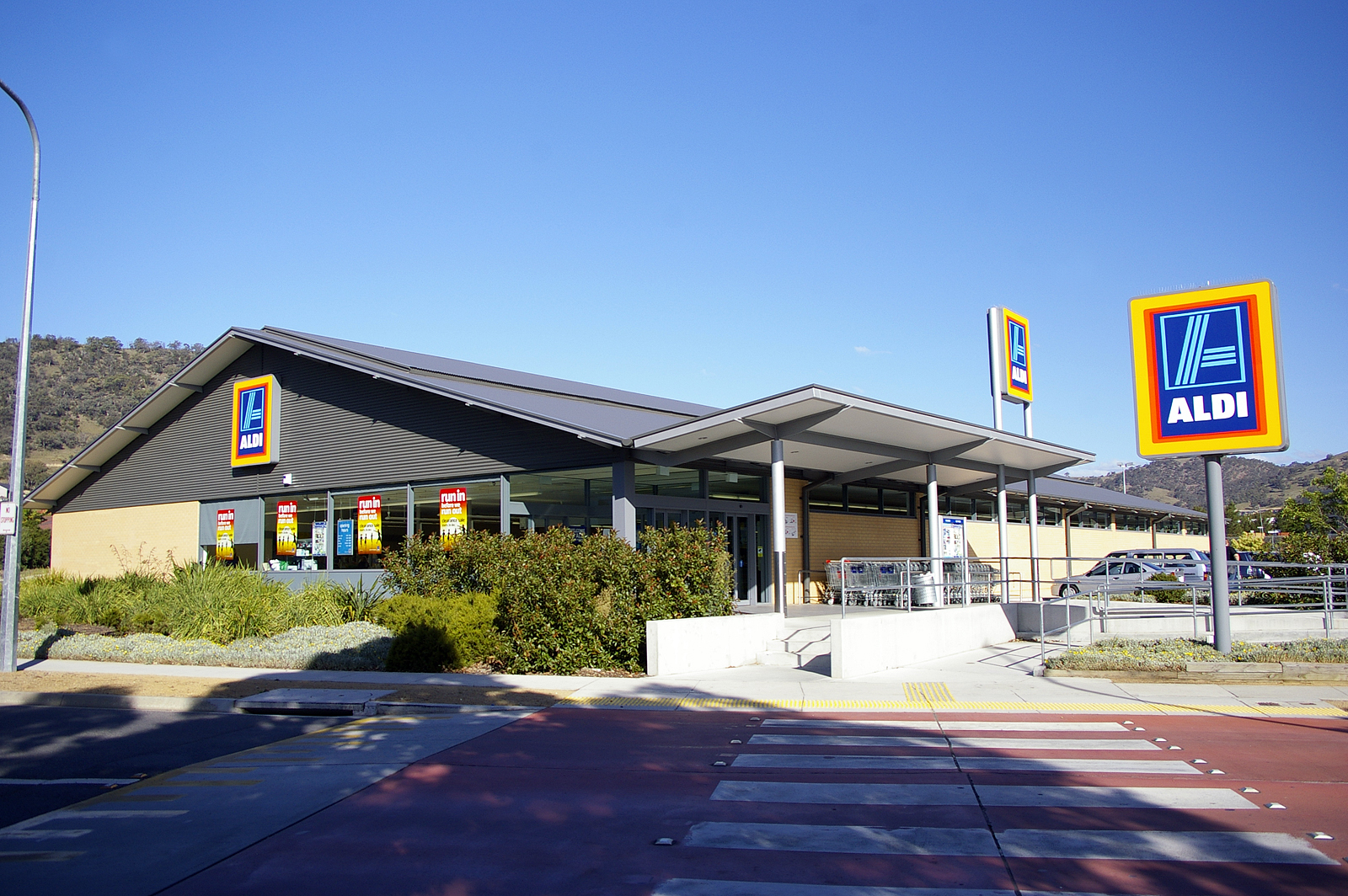
An ALDI Süd store in Conder, Australian Capital Territory, Australia

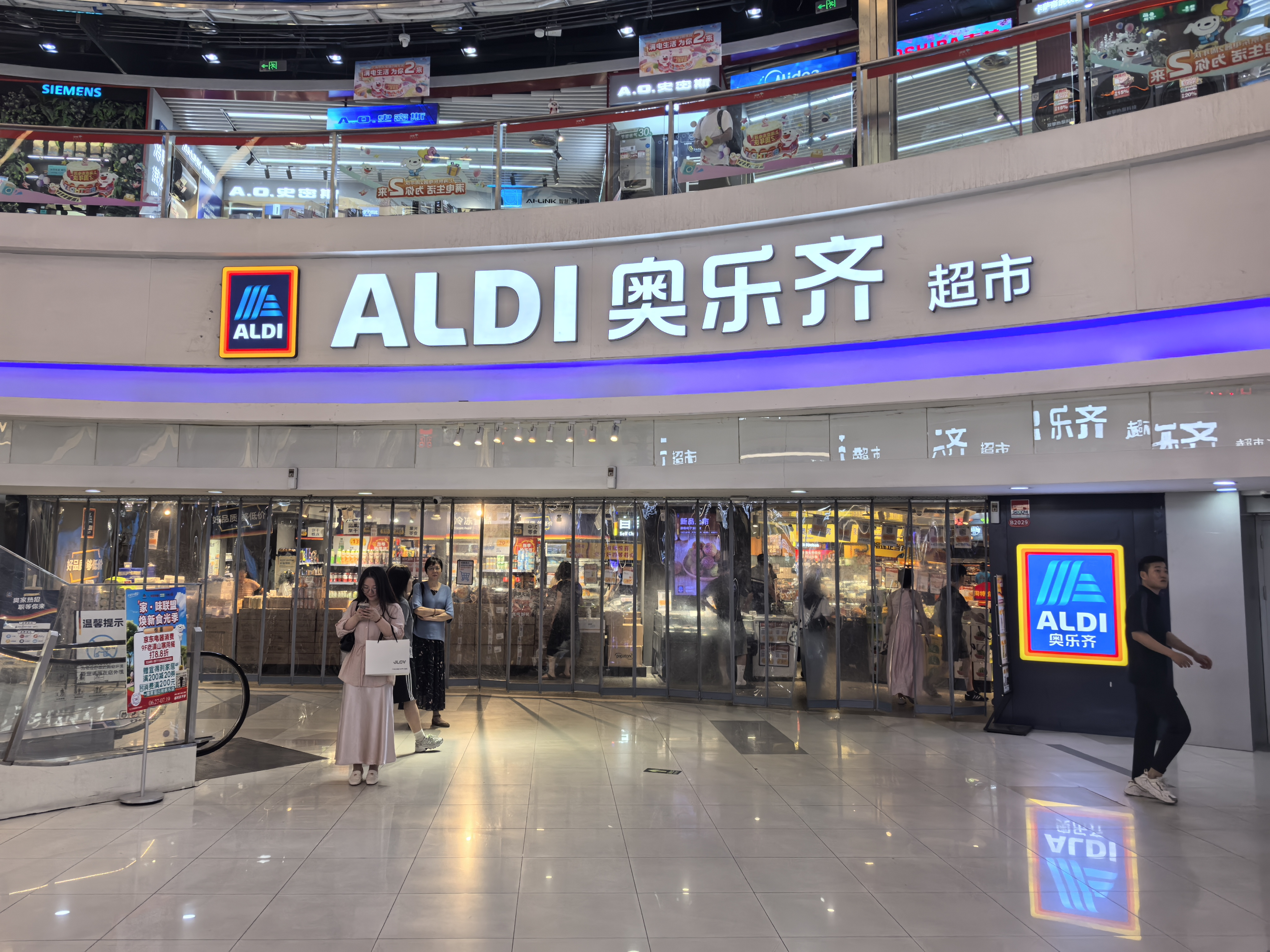
An ALDI Süd store (奥乐齐超市) in Changning, Shanghai, China

=== Geographic distribution ===
Country	Name (group)	Since	Stores	Ware- houses	Number of Employees	As of	Ref.
Australia	Aldi (Süd)	2001	609	8	18,000	Aug. 2026	
Austria	Hofer (Süd)	1968	564	6	12,000	July 2026	
China	Aldi 奥乐齐 (Süd)	2019	117	1	2,600	Aug. 2026	
Germany	Aldi Süd	1961	2,022	24	47,300	Aug. 2026	
Hungary	Aldi (Süd)	2008	189	1	5,550	Aug. 2026	
Ireland	Aldi (Süd)	1999	166	2	4,800	Aug. 2026	
Italy	Aldi (Süd)	2018	211	2	3,900	June 2026	
Slovenia	Hofer (Süd)	2005	93	1	1,900	Aug. 2026	
Switzerland	Aldi Suisse (Süd)	2005	243	3	4,000	Aug. 2026	
United Kingdom	Aldi (Süd)	1990	1,092 (Note: England: 906 stores, Scotland: 107 stores, Wales: 79 stores)	11	46,200	Aug. 2026	
United States	Aldi (Süd) (+ Winn Dixie & Harveys (Note: Rebranding thru 2027))	1976	2,657	26	57,400	Aug. 2026	
Total number of Aldi Süd stores + warehouses			7,963	85	203,650		

== Business practices ==
=== In-store layout ===
Aldi stores are noted as examples of so-called no-frills stores that often display a variety of items at discount prices, specialising in staple items, such as food, beverages, toilet paper, sanitary articles, and other inexpensive household items. Many of its products are own brands, with the number of other brands usually limited to a maximum of two for a given item.

Aldi mainly sells exclusively produced, custom-branded products, often very similar to and produced by major brands, and relies on relabelled major-brand products with brand names including Grandessa, Happy Farms, Millville, Simply Nature, Clancy's, and Fit & Active.

Branded products carried include Haribo in Germany, Knoppers in the United States, Marmite and Branston Pickle in Great Britain, and Vegemite and Milo in Australia. Unlike most shops, Aldi does not accept manufacturers' coupons, although some US stores successfully experimented with them.

In addition to its standard assortment, Aldi has weekly special offers, some of them on more expensive products such as electronics, tools, appliances, or computers. Discount items can include clothing, toys, flowers and gifts. Special offers have limits on quantities and last one week. Aldi's early computer offers in Germany, such as a Commodore 64 in 1987, resulted in those products selling out in a few hours.

In many of its US locations, Aldi has "Aldi Finds" aisles placed in the centre of their stores that feature random specialty items marked down in price, which has been nicknamed the "aisle of shame".

Aldi is the largest wine retailer in Germany. Most Australian stores now sell alcoholic beverages. Some US stores also sell alcoholic beverages, mainly beer and wine, where permitted by local and state laws.

In March 2019, Aldi launched smaller-format stores in Great Britain called Aldi Local, with the first store in Balham, south London. The store has slightly fewer products than a regular Aldi, a preference for fresh products, two sizes of baskets rather than trolleys, and lacks the notable "middle aisle" of weekly offers.

In 2021, Aldi opened its first cashierless store in Great Britain, in Greenwich. The cashierless store was closed in early 2026 and subsequently reopened as a standard store.

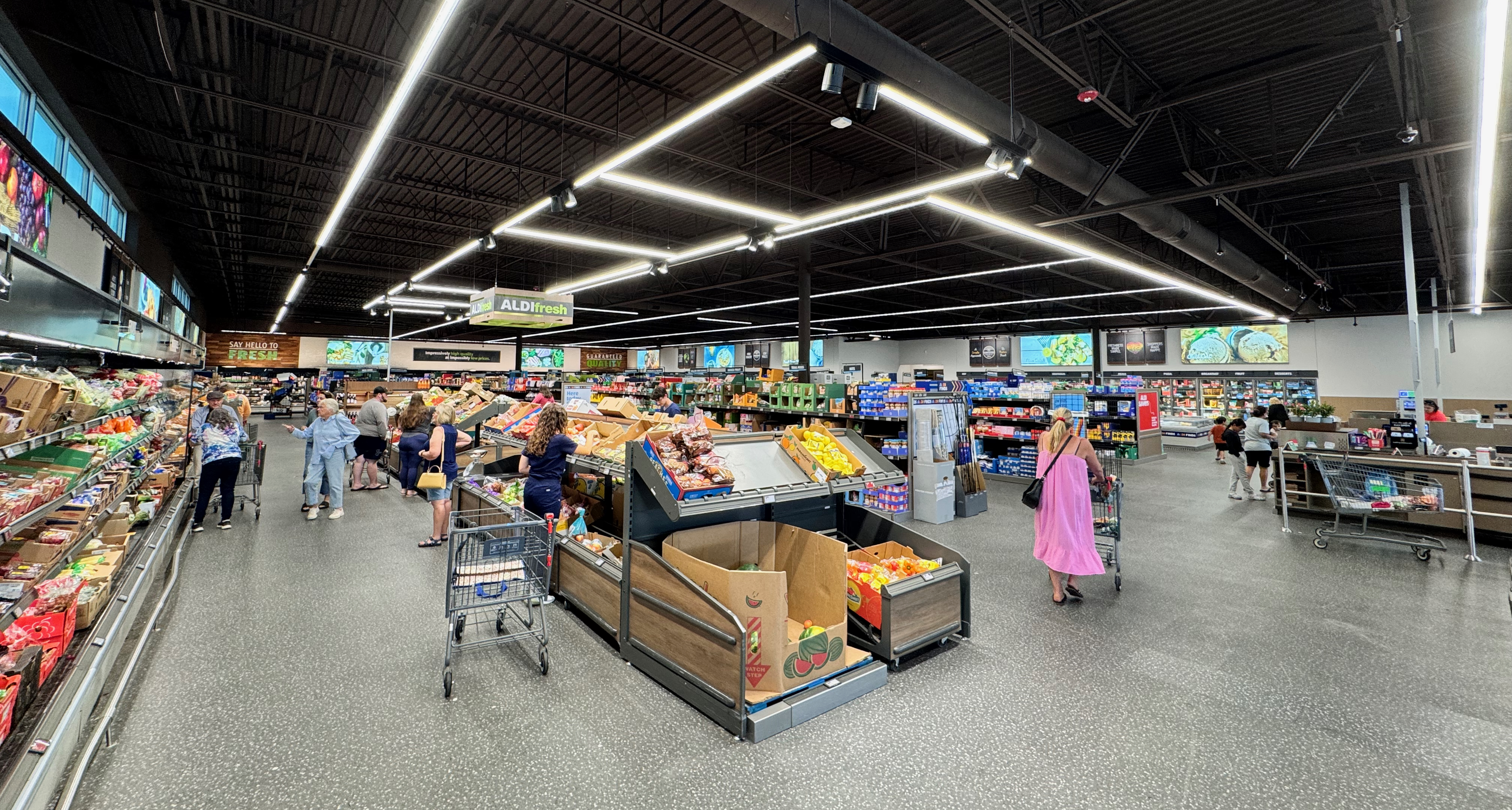
Aldi Süd interior

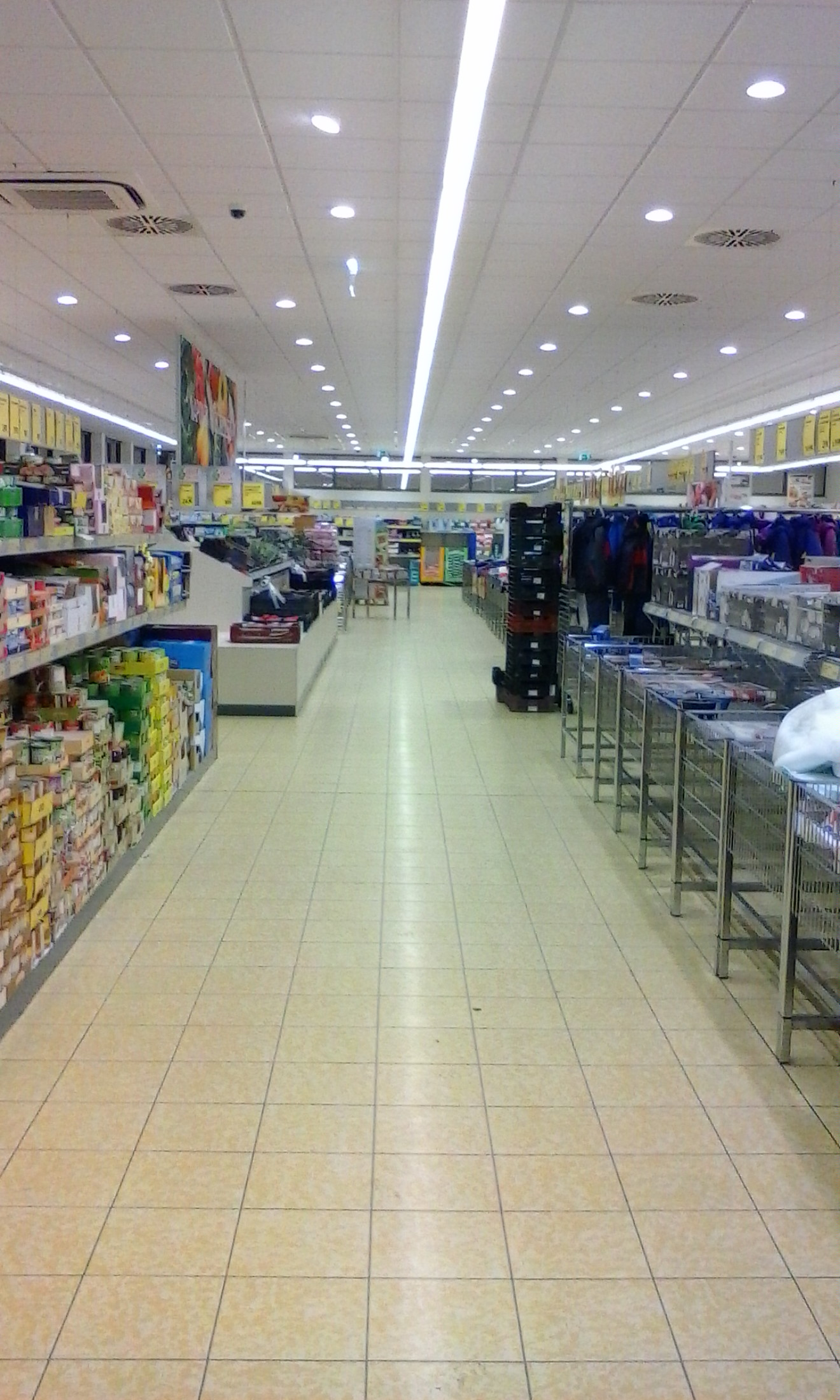
The inside of an Aldi Süd store in Hungary

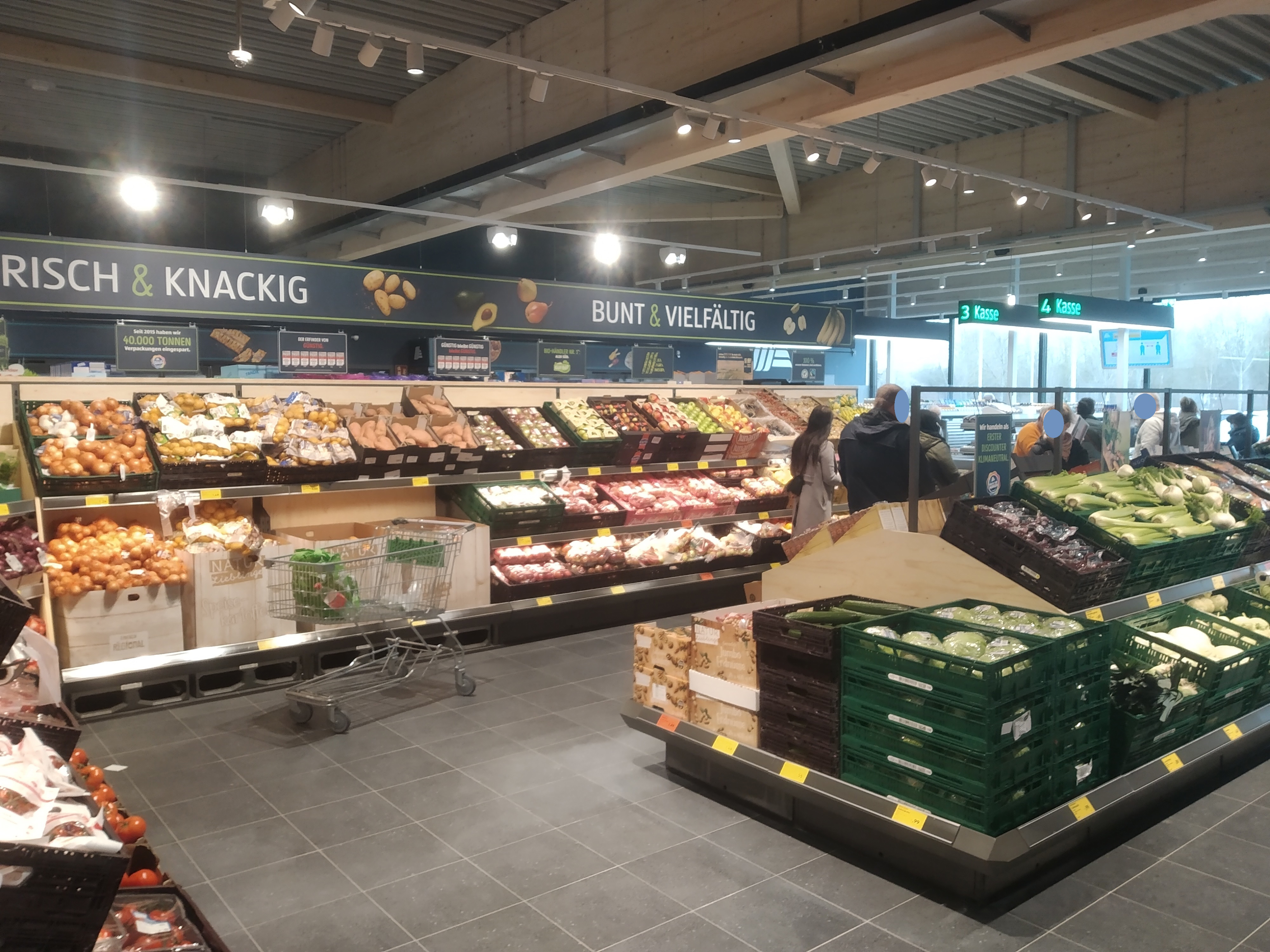
fruits and vegetables displays in a rebuilt Aldi Süd in Diez an der Lahn, Germany

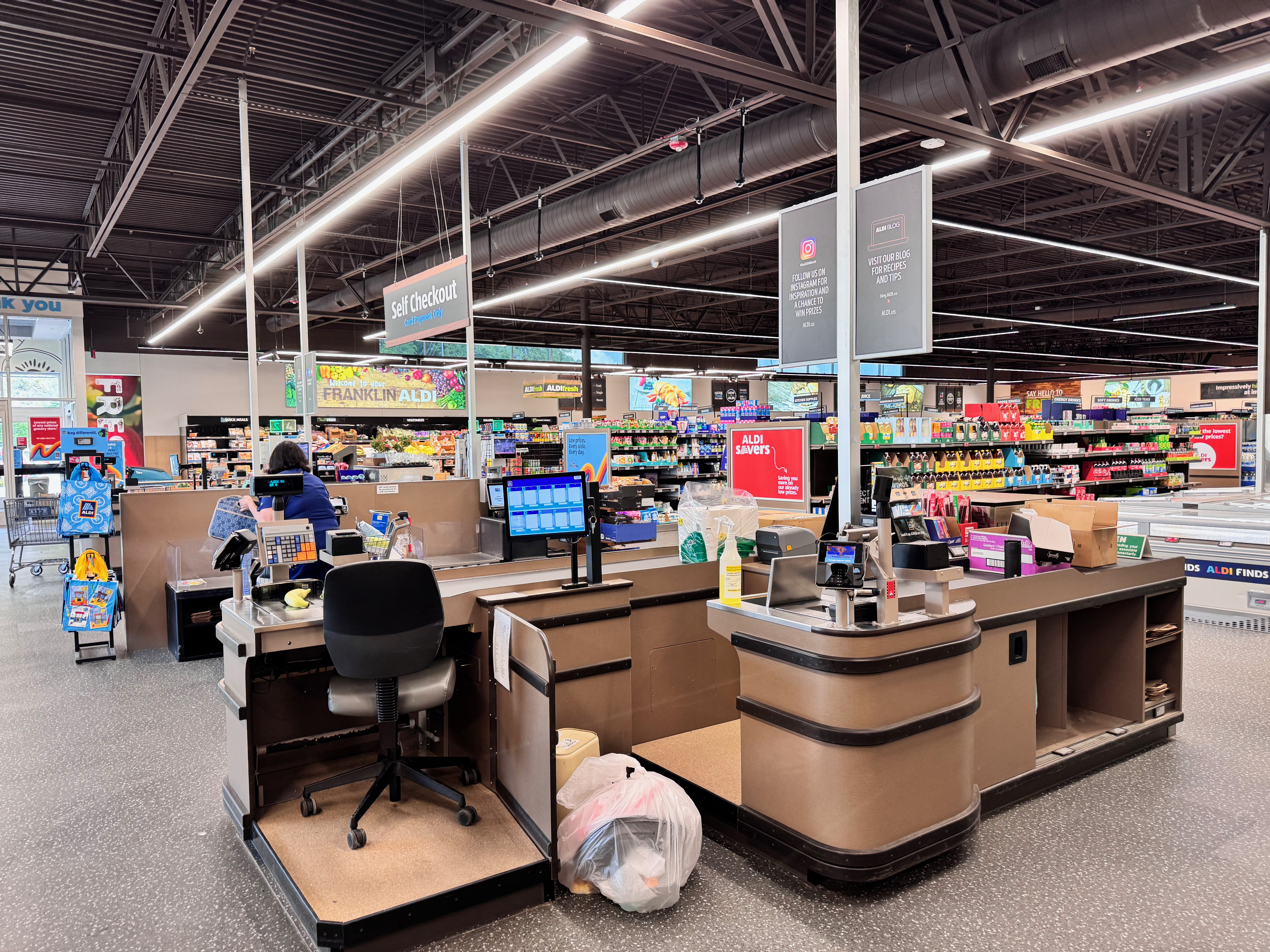
Checkout lanes at an Aldi Süd store in the United States

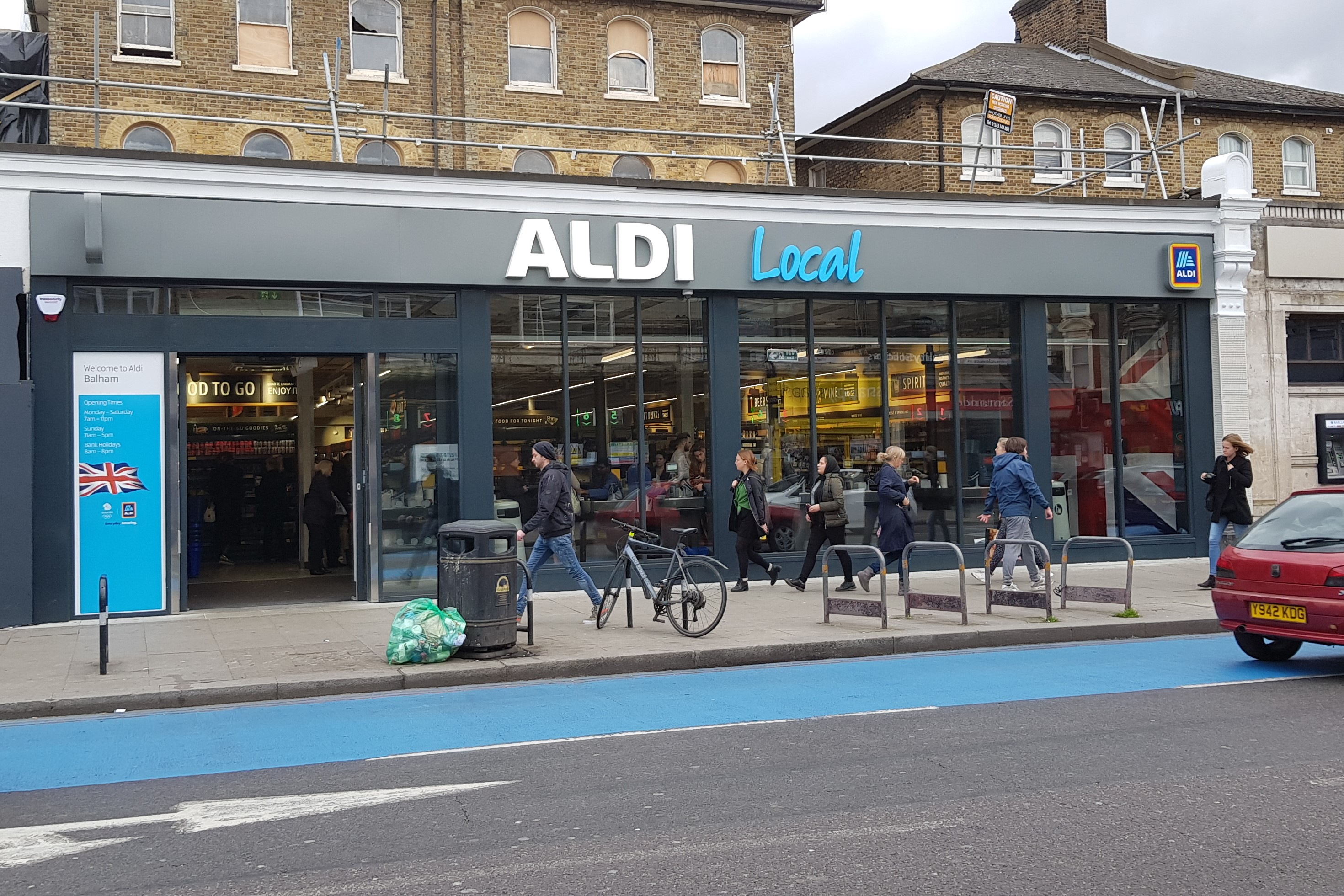
The outside of an Aldi Local, in Balham, London

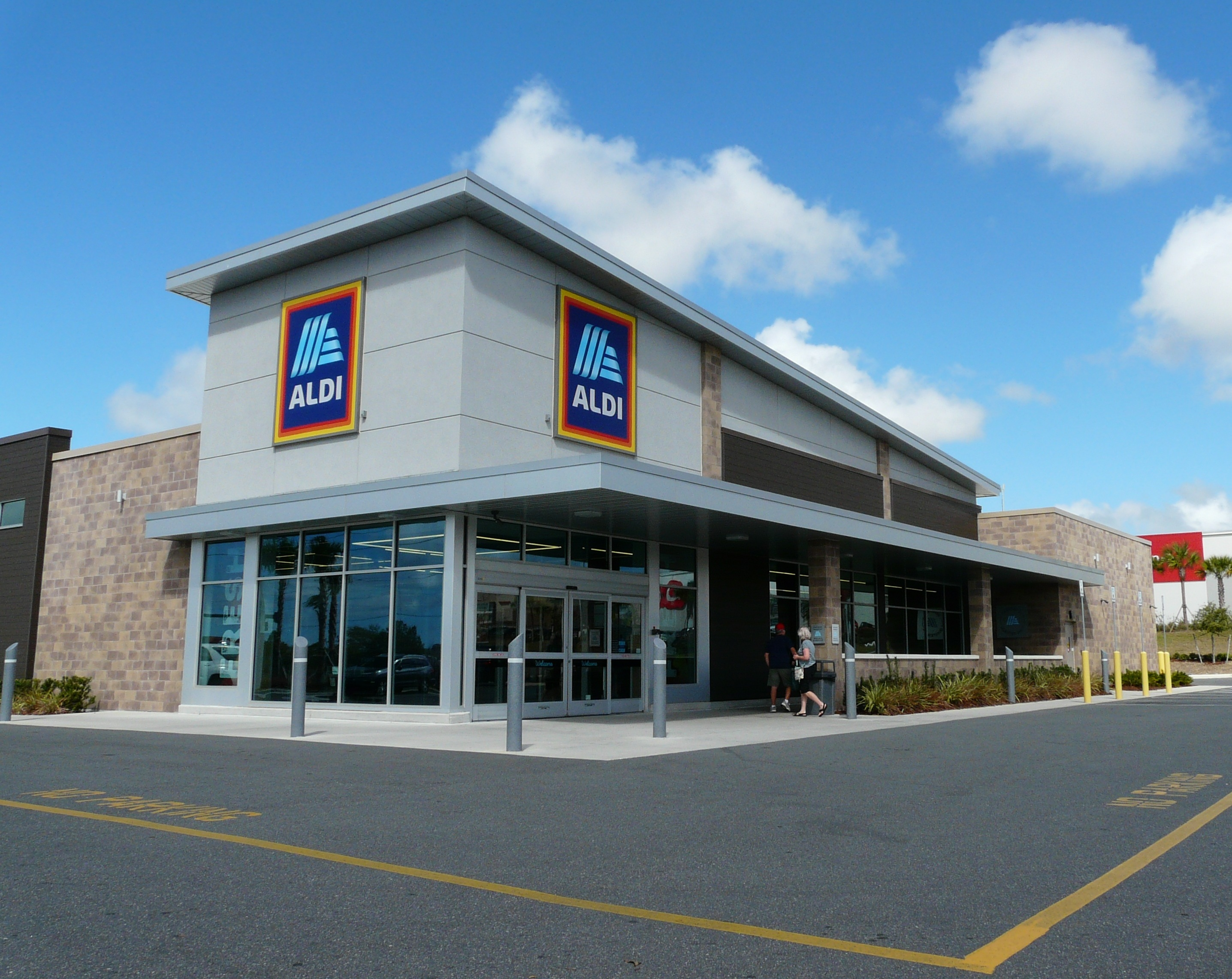
Aldi Süd location in Black Diamond, Florida

=== Advertising policy ===
In the United States, it advertises in newspapers, on television, through print ads distributed in stores, and via the Internet.

In the United Kingdom and Ireland, print and television ads have appeared since May 2005. In 2016, Aldi began producing a series of Christmas ads to rival John Lewis' featuring a carrot named Kevin. In 2024, Aldi partnered with British television channel Channel 4 to sponsor its food programming strands.

In Australia, television advertising is common, and the current ads are listed on the Australian website.

=== Logos and branding ===
Variant of Aldi Süd logo used internationally from 2006 until March 2017

Variant of Aldi Süd logo in Germany

Variant of Hofer logo

Aldi Süd has a distinct logo from its counterpart Aldi Nord, with Nord displaying the entire 'A' for Aldi. Süd unveiled a logo in 1982 that displays half an "A". In 2006, Aldi Süd modified the logo slightly and then in March 2017, unveiled a new logo that removed the blue box line around the artistic 'A' and revealed a more rounded, three-dimensional look for the logo, as well as a new font for the word ALDI, further differentiating it from the Aldi Nord logo, which had shared the same font for the brand until then.

=== Sustainability ===
Between 2012 and 2019, Aldi's UK operations became "carbon neutral", with investments in solar, green energy, energy efficiency, and offsets reducing greenhouse gas emissions by 53% per square metre of sales floor. On 4 March 2020, Aldi announced that all its suppliers must use recyclable, reusable, or compostable packaging by 2025. In January 2024, the company announced plans to eliminate plastic bags from its 2,300 US stores. Cloth bags would still be available for customer use. It also said it would aim to use natural refrigerants in its US stores by the end of 2035. Other grocery retailers were making similar moves at the time of the announcement.

=== Animal welfare ===
In 2016, Aldi committed to sourcing only cage-free eggs by the end of 2025. In 2024, it completed this transition for its stores in Great Britain. In November 2024, Aldi and other major British retailers joined a letter by Compassion in World Farming calling on the UK government to ban cages for egg-laying hens.

In 2022, Aldi UK reported a hock burn rate of 33.5% of chickens in its supply chain, compared to a target rate of no greater than 15% set by Red Tractor standards. Aldi UK has committed to working with its suppliers to reduce hock burn rates as part of its animal welfare strategy.

== Reputation ==
In the United Kingdom, Aldi has won Supermarket of the Year two years in a row (2012/13), and in 2013, Aldi won the Grocer of the Year Award. In February 2015, Aldi narrowly lost to Waitrose for the title of Supermarket of the Year 2015. In April 2015, Aldi overtook Waitrose to become the United Kingdom's sixth-largest supermarket chain.

In February 2017, Aldi overtook the Co-op to become the United Kingdom's fifth-largest supermarket chain. In May 2017, Aldi lost out to Marks & Spencer for the title of Supermarket of the Year 2017, published by the magazine Which?. According to 2019 research, nearly two-thirds of households in Great Britain visit an Aldi or Lidl branch at least once every 12 weeks.

In the United States, due to the relatively low staffing of Aldi locations compared to other supermarket chains, Aldi has a reputation of starting employees out at significantly higher than minimum wage, unusual among American supermarkets.

In Ireland, Aldi has been accused of a "lack of corporate responsibility" to their farmer suppliers by the Irish Farmers' Association.

Australian trucking giant Scott's Refrigerated Logistics was plunged into receivership and liquidation in March 2023 after going into voluntary administration that February. This sparked protests from the Transport Workers' Union, who blamed Aldi Australia for increasing strains on the company during the last few years of shortages and inflation.

Rapper Kanye West mentioned Aldi in the song "Problematic" in 2024, with the song's lyrics becoming viral online in November 2024.

"Used to shop at Aldi's, I ran up some numbers, now I got what y'all need" —Kanye West, Problematic (2024)

== Subsidiaries and joint ventures ==
Subsidiaries include the mobile network operator Aldi Talk, the alcoholic drink brand Aldi Alcohol, and petrol station retailer Diskont. Home appliance and multimedia products are labeled under different names, mostly manufactured by Medion.

=== Aldi Talk ===
Aldi has a mobile virtual network operator in Germany called Aldi Talk, also known as MEDIONmobile (service provider is Medion). Aldi operates a similar network in Australia using Telstra's network, called "ALDImobile". Aldimobile is also in Switzerland by Sunrise LLC. In Austria and Slovenia, Hofer stores serve as distributors for the brand HoT Hofer Telekom (the service provider is Ventocom).

=== Aldi Alcohol ===
Aldi sells low-cost alcohol from its alcohol stores. Until March 2016, Aldi had an alcohol website serving the east coast of Australia. This has now been closed down, citing it wishes to focus on expanding the supermarket chain across Australia. In November 2019, Aldi announced same-day beer and wine delivery via a partnership with Instacart in the US.

=== Diskont ===
In Austria through its subsidiary Hofer, Aldi has a joint venture with the local petrol retailer OMV Downstream GmbH, to create some no-frills petrol stations called Diskont. The 85 stations in Austria are on or near the stores, providing self-serve unleaded or diesel fuel by card-operated pumps. These have been in operation since 2009.

=== Aldi Insurance ===
Aldi launched Aldi Insurance in Australia in June 2024. The company provides home and contents insurance, car insurance, and landlord's insurance backed by Honey Insurance and RACQ Insurance.
