= Wilhelm Wallbaum =

German union official and politician

- Wallbaum, circa 1919
- Born: April 4, 1876; Werther, Westfalen
- Died: September 13, 1933 (aged 57); Berlin, Germany
- Occupation: Politician

Wilhelm Wallbaum (4 April 1876 – 14 September 1933) was a German union official and politician. He was prominent within the Christian Social Party (CSP) and the German National People's Party (DNVP), of which he was a co-founder. Wallbaum was chairman of the CSP at the time of DNVP's founding and urged the executive committee to merge with the new party.
