= Mamba (candy) =

Type of candy

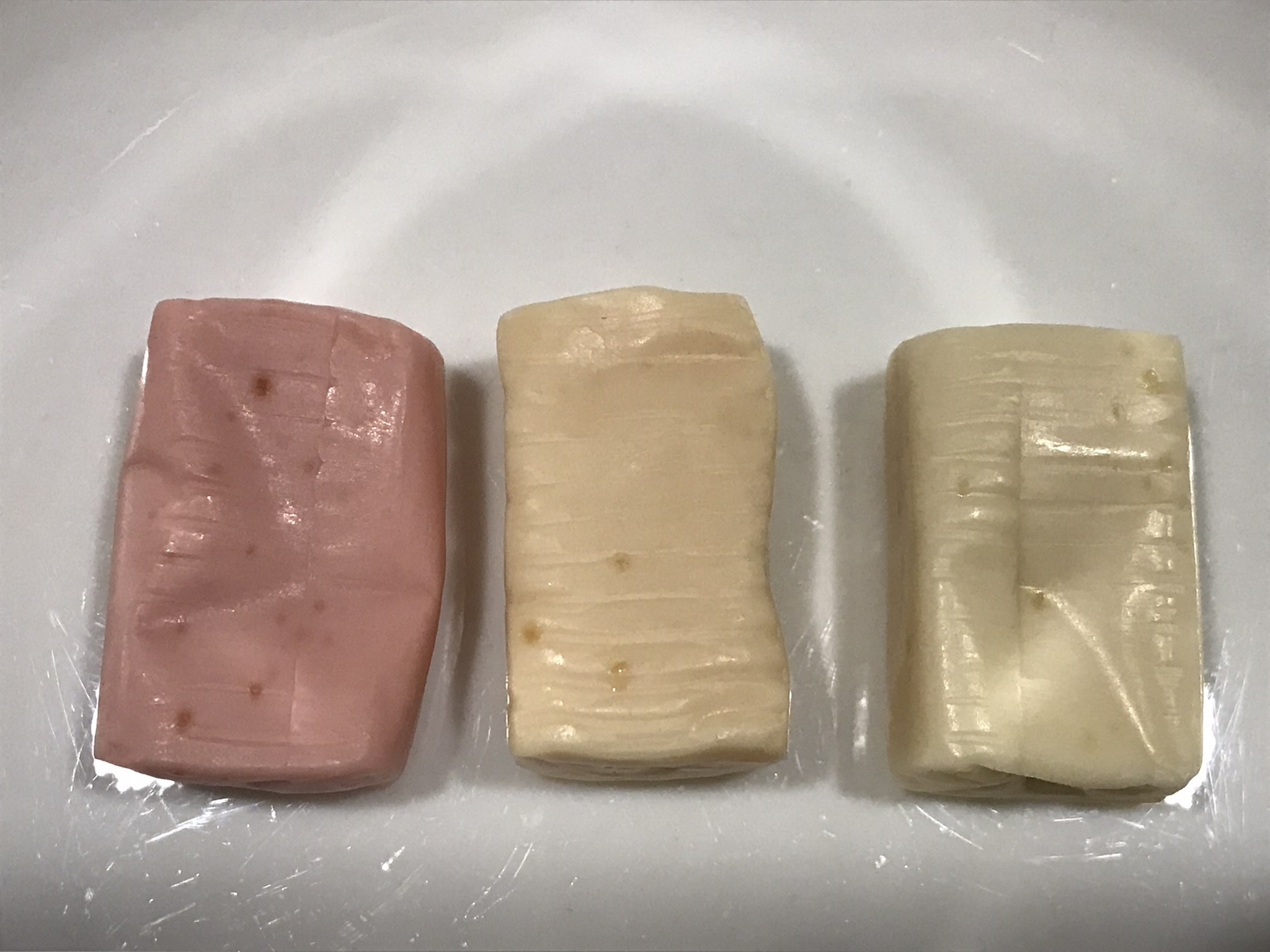
- Unwrapped Mamba candies. From left to right: cherry, orange, and lemon flavors
- Product type: Candy
- Current owner: August Storck
- Country: Germany
- Introduced: 1953; 73 years ago
- Markets: Worldwide
- Website: mamba.com

Mamba fruit chews are a brand of fruit chew candies, produced by August Storck KG. They are available in the flavors of strawberry, orange, lemon, raspberry, and cherry. Mamba was launched in the German market in 1953 and in the US in 1986. They are sold in packages of 6, 18, 24, or 35 soft chews, and the flavors within each package are selected at random.

== History ==
Storck introduced Mamba (candy) in 1953 as a new fruit chew candy. The original packaging contained six pieces per pack to encourage sharing. The candy quickly became one of Storck’s best-selling products. In 1953, Storck also began exporting its candies internationally, including early shipments to markets in the United States. Decades later, Mamba was formally launched in the U.S. market in 1986. Throughout its history, Mamba has remained under Storck’s ownership.

Over time, Storck expanded the Mamba line with new flavors and formats. In the mid-2000s, the Sour variety was introduced (featuring tangy versions of the original fruit flavors). In 2017, Storck launched the Tropics assortment with exotic fruit blends (e.g. pineapple–coconut, mango–orange) to broaden the product range. The company has also marketed special sub-brands such as Mamba Magic Sticks, which are longer bars with two flavours in one stick. Storck continues to sell Mamba internationally, leveraging its global distribution network (the company maintains subsidiaries in about 20 countries and distribution partnerships in over 60 countries.)

== Flavours ==
Mamba chews are sold in several flavour assortments. The original fruit mix includes four classic flavours: strawberry, raspberry, lemon, and orange. The Sour variety contains sour versions of the fruit flavours. The Tropics assortment features tropical fruit blends such as peach-passionfruit, apple-kiwi, pineapple-coconut, and mango-orange. In addition, the Mamba Magic Sticks line includes dual-flavour sticks. Flavours in each pack are mixed at random, so a given pack may contain varying counts of each flavour.

- Original Fruit: Strawberry; Raspberry; Lemon; Orange; Cherry
- Tropics: Peach-Passionfruit; Pineapple–Coconut; Apple-Kiwi; Mango-Orange
- Sour: Sour Raspberry; Sour Strawberry; Sour Lemon; Sour Orange
- Magic Sticks: Cherry-Apple; Mango–Strawberry; Pineapple-Orange; Watermelon-Raspberry
- Fun Park: Raspberry Popcorn; Strawberry Cotton Candy; Candy Apple; Blueberry Slushie
