= Arnold Peters (actor) =

English actor (1925–2013)

- Born: Peter Reginald Gadd; 3 June 1925; Hendon, Middlesex, England
- Died: 11 May 2013 (aged 87); Northamptonshire, England
- Occupation: Actor
- Known for: Jack Woolley in The Archers
- Spouse: Beryl Peters
- Children: 1
- Relatives: Gyles Brandreth (cousin)

Peter Reginald Gadd (3 June 1925 – 11 May 2013), known professionally as Arnold Peters, was an English actor, who played Jack Woolley in The Archers radio soap opera for 31 years.

== Biography ==
Born in Hendon, Middlesex, but brought up in Northamptonshire, he was educated as a day boy at Wellingborough School. He joined the Royal Air Force in 1944, but was found to be unfit for military service, and after the war spent five years at the Northampton Repertory Theatre (now the Royal & Derngate). While performing in a pantomime during this period he met Beryl, a dancer, who became his wife.

Peters made many appearances on TV, including a regular role in Swizzlewick (1964), which also featured Philip Garston-Jones, whom he replaced as Jack Woolley, and Margot Boyd, also known for her work in The Archers. He also appeared in Please Sir! (1970), Jude the Obscure (1971), London Belongs to Me (Thames, 1977), Dennis Potter's Pennies from Heaven (1978) and an episode of Only Fools and Horses called "A Royal Flush" (1986). In the 1990s, Peters appeared in television advertisements for Werther's Original Toffees.

He was best known for playing businessman and hotelier Jack Woolley in the long-running BBC radio series The Archers from May 1980 until 2011. Jack Woolley was not the first role he had performed in The Archers but was by far the most extended of his three roles in the soap opera; he had first joined the cast in 1953, the year he became a Midlands member of the BBC repertory company. The role, as farmhand Len Thomas. lasted for 13 years, and the actor was soon cast again, as the Reverend David Latimer, in 1968; the character died in 1973.

== Personal life ==
Peters lived in the village of Wollaston, Northamptonshire. He died in Northamptonshire on 11 May 2013, after suffering from Alzheimer's disease for some years, a condition with which he was diagnosed shortly after his Archers' character.

He was the cousin of Gyles Brandreth. He was married to Beryl Peters, whom he met when they appeared in a production of Cinderella, and had a daughter, Caroline, who was a teacher of ballet and drama.

== Filmography ==
Year	Title	Role	Notes
1966	A Man for All Seasons	6th Courier	Uncredited
1969	The Body Stealers	Mr. Smith	
