= Bendicks =

Brand of chocolate

Bendicks of Mayfair
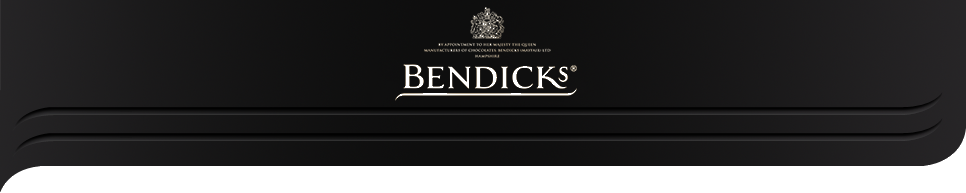
- Industry: Confectionery
- Founded: 1930
- Parent: August Storck

Bendicks is a chocolate brand currently owned by August Storck KG, known for its "quintessentially British" Bittermint dark mint chocolates, still made to the original recipe of 1931.

== History ==
In 1930 Oscar Benson and Colonel 'Bertie' Dickson purchased a confectionery business at 164 Church street in Kensington, London, with the chocolates made in a tiny basement below the shop. They used the first syllable of each of their surnames to come up with the name Bendicks.

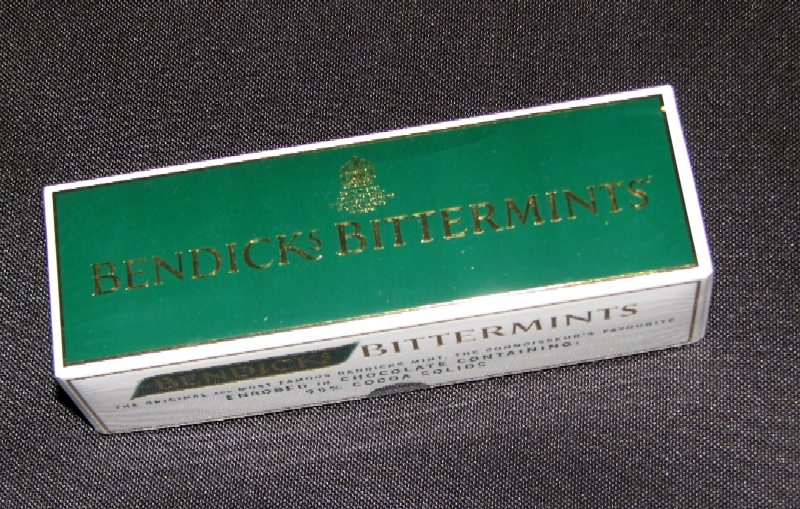
A box of Bittermints

In 1931 Benson's sister-in-law, Lucia Benson, came up with a dark chocolate so bitter that it was virtually inedible on its own, and combined it with a mint fondant that was so strongly flavoured with mint oil that it was also difficult to eat on its own. When the two parts were combined they produced a very palatable chocolate that they named Bendicks Bittermints. The chocolate coating contains 95% cocoa solids.

By 1933, Bendicks was developing a reputation for quality and a new store was opened in the heart of London's exclusive Mayfair. Prominent among the visitors was the Duke of Kent, son of King George V, who visited for the renowned Bittermints. The company soon became known as Bendicks of Mayfair.

In 1946 the business was sold to Mr. Edgar Lawley. By 1952 Bendicks had moved to a building which bridged St. Thomas Street and Little Minster Street in Winchester, Hampshire. This building, which has now been demolished and replaced by residential properties and garages, had been constructed in around 1890 and been used as The Winchester Temperance Billiards Hall. It had already acquired the business of William Cox & Son, manufacturers of Royal Winchester Chocolates (a name which has been discontinued), which had been located in St. George's Street, Winchester (now occupied by McDonald's).

The reputation of the company and its products was further enhanced in 1962 when it was awarded the coveted Royal Warrant: "By Appointment to Her Majesty The Queen".

The main part of the business was chocolate coated confectionery and these were all hand dipped, giving a much thicker layer of chocolate, and the availability of female 'dippers' was a constraint on the growth of the business. They also produced confectionery products such as nougat and chocolate bars. A feature of Bittermints was that they could be purchased in 9 inch, 18 inch and 36 inch boxes (by the yard).

In 1967 the business was moved to a purpose-built factory in Moorside Road, Winchester. During the 1960s it had been acquired by Wood Hall Trust Ltd. (itself subsequently being acquired by Elders IXL, the Australian conglomerate, in 1982). In later years enrobing equipment was introduced allowing an increase in production.

In the 1960s the business also owned a number of retail outlets in prestigious parts of London. Two were located in Wigmore Street and Sloane Street, both of which were also restaurants. The remaining shops were located in Bond Street, Throgmorton Street and Curzon Street (the latter trading under its own name of Supex Ltd.) Many of the products sold in these shops were chocolate confectionery packed in fine china (Wedgwood, Doulton etc.) so that the remaining 'container' became a useful quality object and customers could bring in quality china containers to have filled with confectionery to be given as gifts.

In 1983, the company was purchased by Nabisco Brands and later managed within the Biscuit Division of Nabisco Group Ltd, through its head office in Reading, Berkshire.

Since 1988 Bendicks has been a subsidiary of the German sweet producer, August Storck.

=== 21st century ===
The brand diversified in 2002, introducing Mingles, an ultimately unsuccessful selection box of chocolates. On 18 April 2011, Storck announced its plan to move chocolate production from its factory in Hampshire to Germany, with the loss of 84 jobs; 30 marketing and sales jobs were to remain at the Winchester site. The decision was based on economic factors, namely a weak chocolate market and lack of profitability at the English factory. The managing director of Storck, Thomas Huber, blamed the decision on a decline in the market, explaining the decision had been driven by commercial reality.

In December 2023, Bendicks announced via their website that they would cease their Kosher certification which until then had been provided by the London Beth Din. Anger amongst the Jewish community led to a clarification on the Bendicks website that no ingredients have or will change but that the company "cannot commit to the process of production required to remain certified." In May 2024, Bendicks and the London Beth Din announced that Bendicks would remain Kosher-certified following "in-depth consultation".
