= Merci (candy) =

Brand of German candy

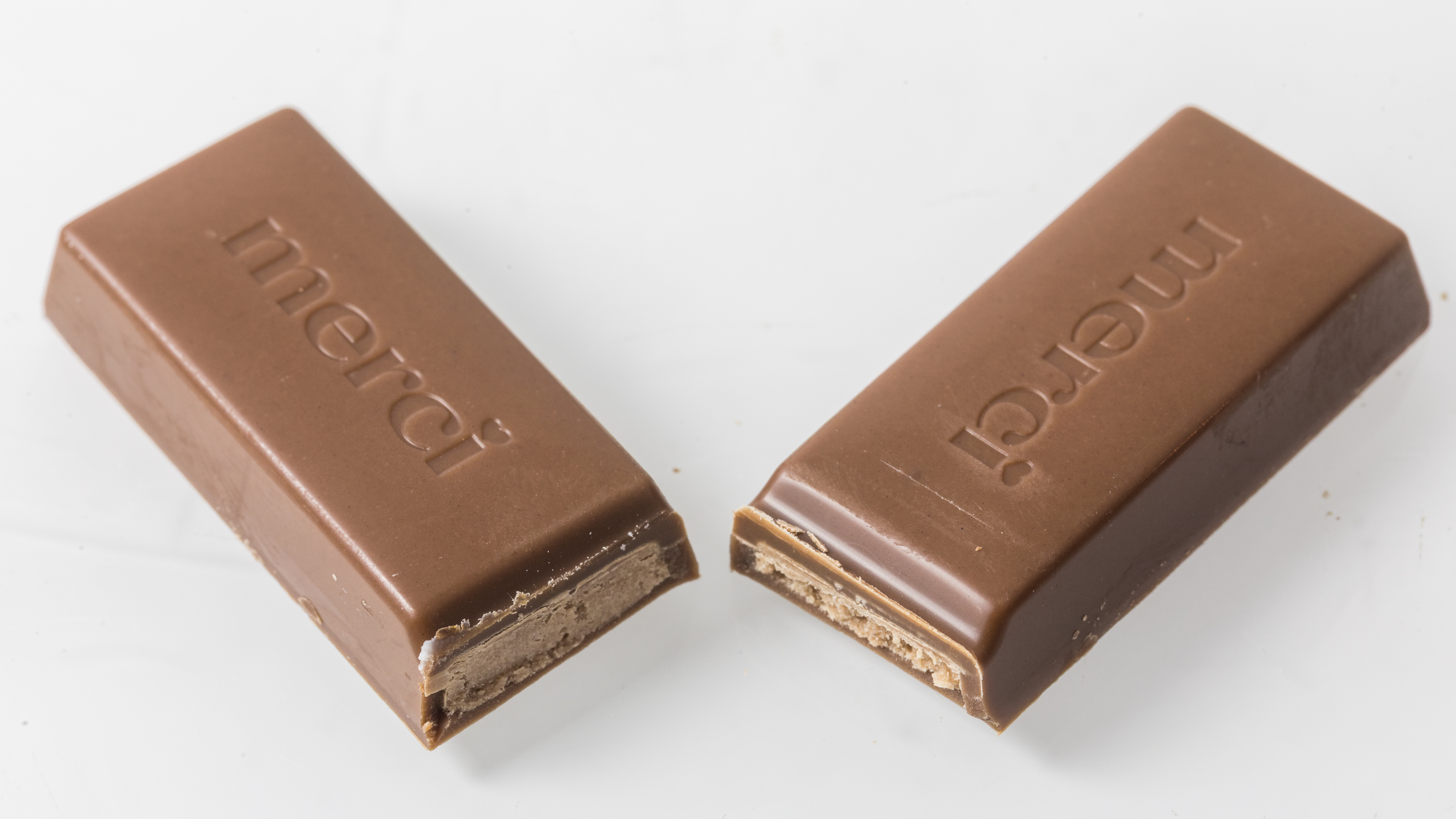
Merci

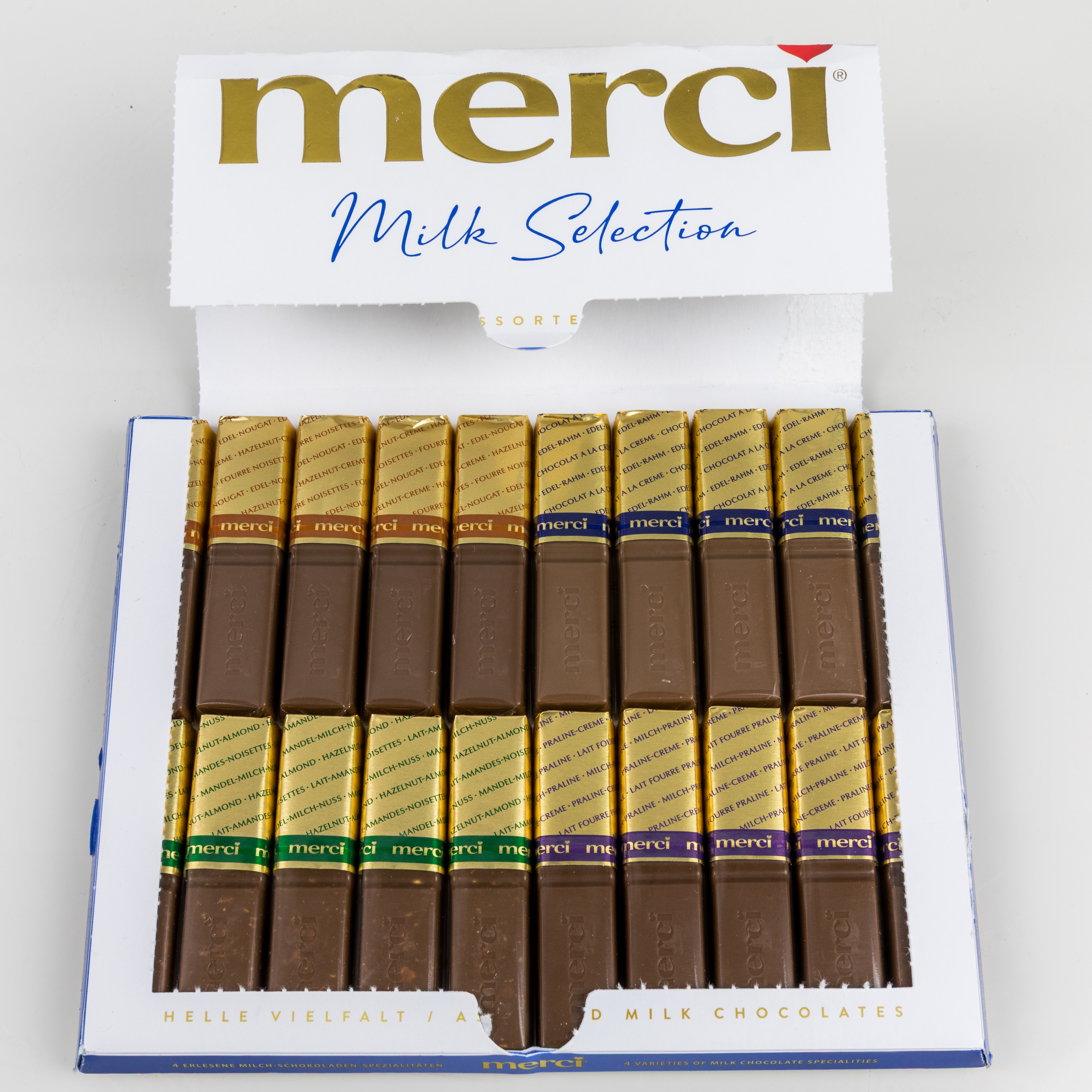
Merci - Milk Selection

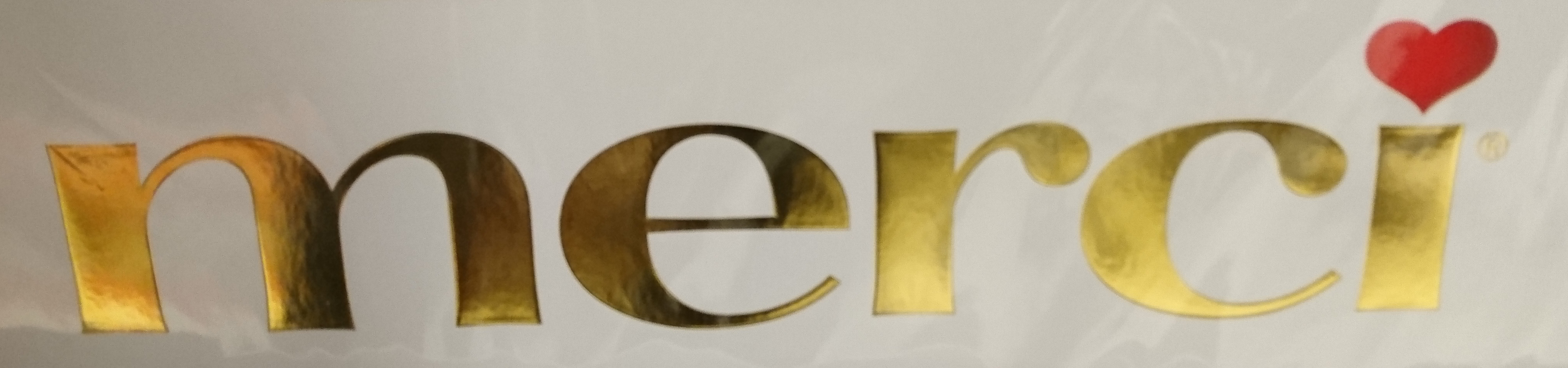
merci (logo)

Merci (French for "thank you") is a brand of chocolate candy manufactured by the German company August Storck. Merci is manufactured as bars of different kinds of chocolate with different fillings, such as plain milk chocolate, coffee and cream, hazelnut-almond, hazelnut crème, marzipan, praline-cream, dark cream, and dark mousse. In 2015, it tried to break into the Chinese market.

It is produced at the Ohrdruf cocoa processing plant in Thuringia.
