= St. Jacobi, Werther =

St. Jacobi
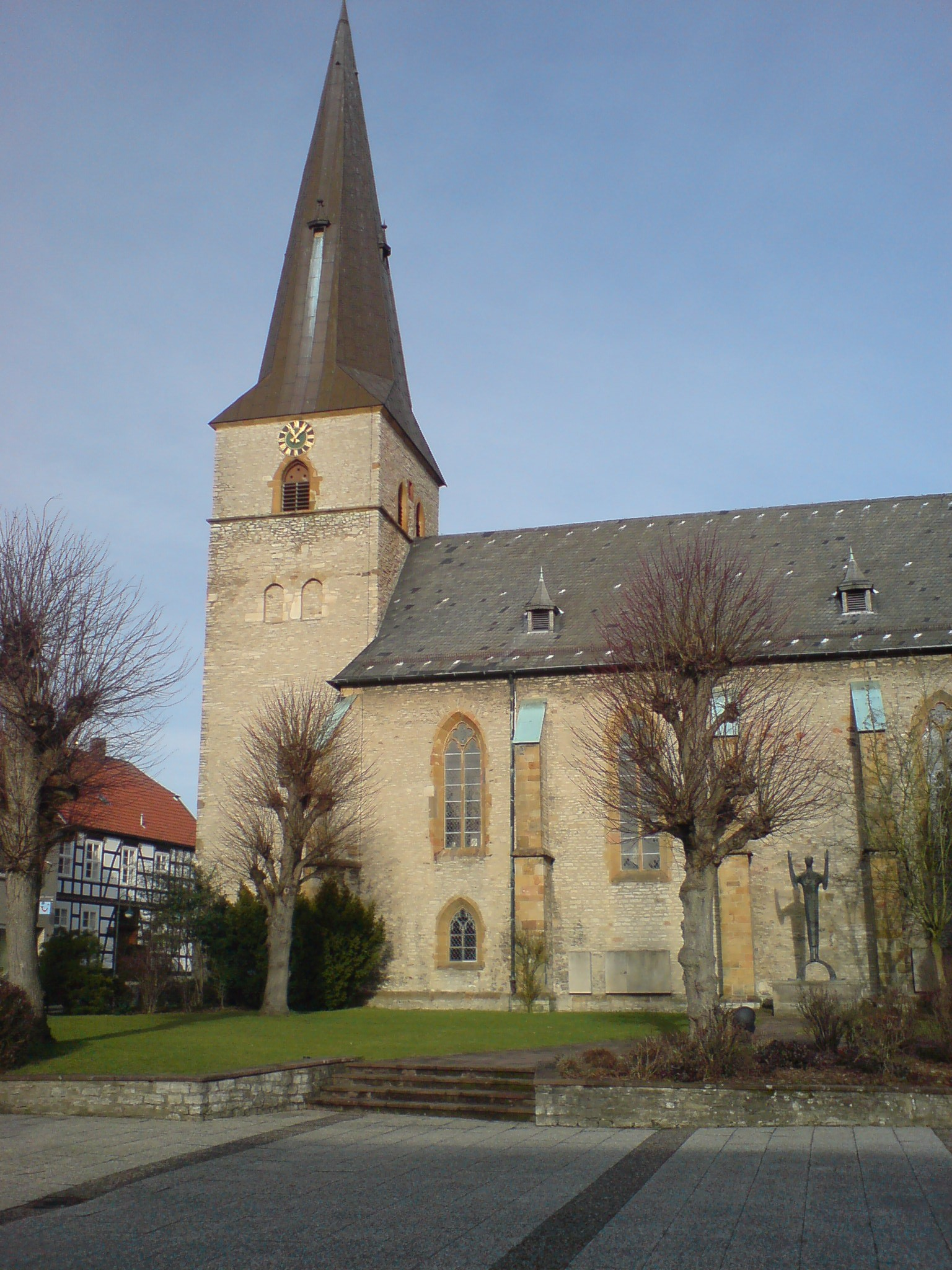
- Gothic part with tower

Religion
- Affiliation: Lutheran
- Province: Evangelische Kirche von Westfalen
- Ecclesiastical or organizational status: Parish church

Location
- Location: Werther, North Rhine-Westphalia, Germany
- Interactive map of St. Jacobi
- Coordinates: 52°04′20″N 08°24′50″E

Architecture
- Type: Hall church
- Style: Gothic
- Completed: 14th century

Website
- www.kirche-werther.de

St. Jacobi is a Lutheran church and parish in Werther, North Rhine-Westphalia, Germany. The present building was begun in the 14th century, and was expanded in 1876. The parish became Lutheran in 1570.

== History ==
The location of Werther appeared first as "Wartera" in a document before 1009. A church was first mentioned in 1312. Archeological research below the church found remnants of a building from the 9th century, described as a simple building without a tower, surrounded by a cemetery.

Around 1200, a church was built in the shape of a cross from Bruchstein. The nave of the present church was begun in the 14th century in Gothic style, with a ribbed vault over consoles and semicircular wall templates. The church was dedicated to Jakobus der Ältere, as a document from 1748 supports.

In 1570, Werther and its church became Lutheran. The building was expanded in 1876/77 by a transept and a choir, following designs by A. Hartmann in Gothic Revival style. He decorated the south transept with a display facade (Schaufassade). The transepts have galleries. The stained-glass choir windows were created by the Königlichen Institut für Glasmalerei (Royal Institute for Stained Glass) in Berlin in 1878, with the central window being a donation by the Prussian King. In 1981, the historic interior of the late 19th century was restored.

The foundation of the west tower dates to the 13th century, while the upper tower was added in 1876/77. It is the highest building in Werther, dominating the skyline. The parish belongs to the Halle district of the Evangelische Kirche von Westfalen. It took until 2009 to find confirmation in the archives that the original dedication was to Jakobus the Elder (James the Great), and not to Jakobus the Younger (James, son of Alphaeus).

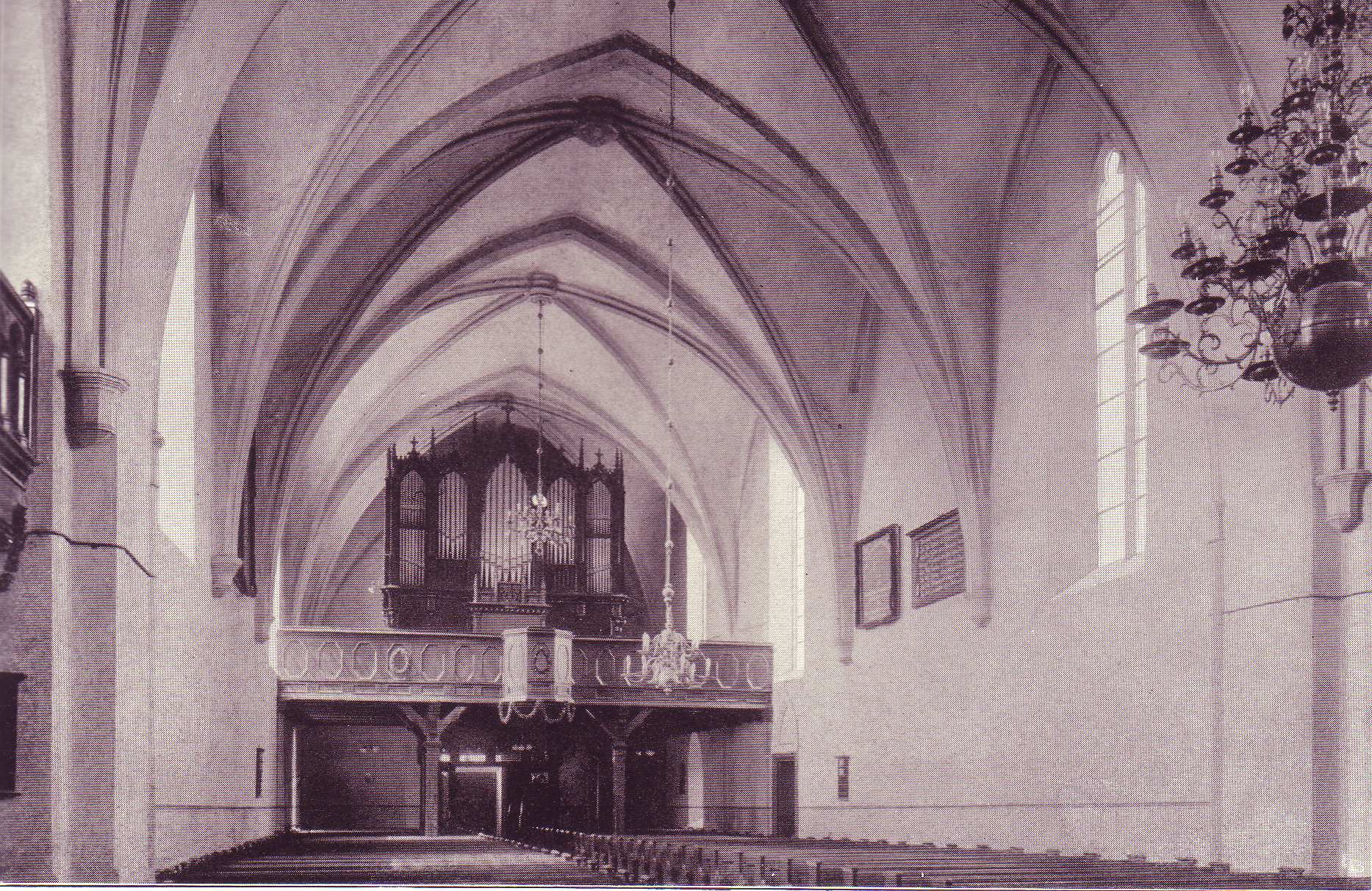
Nave to the west, 1908

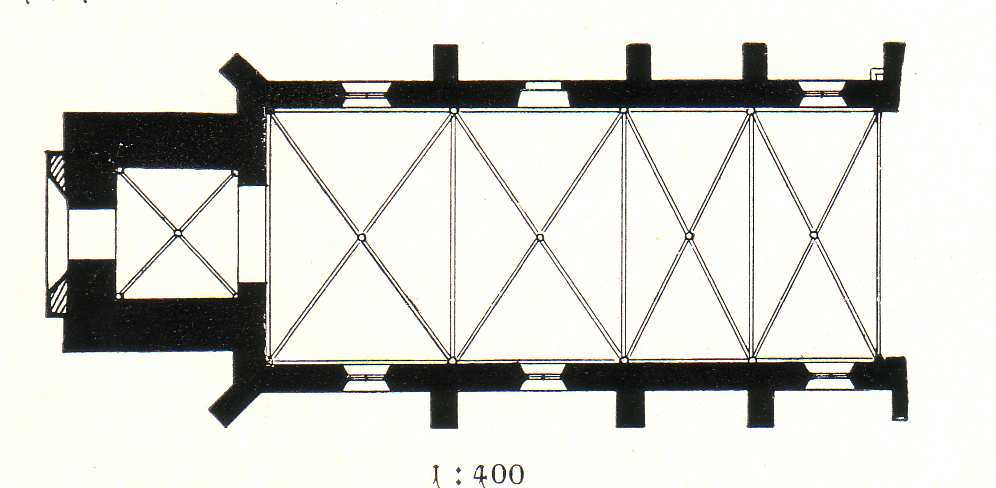
Floorplan, 1908
