= Knoppers (sweet brand) =

Brand of wafer candy

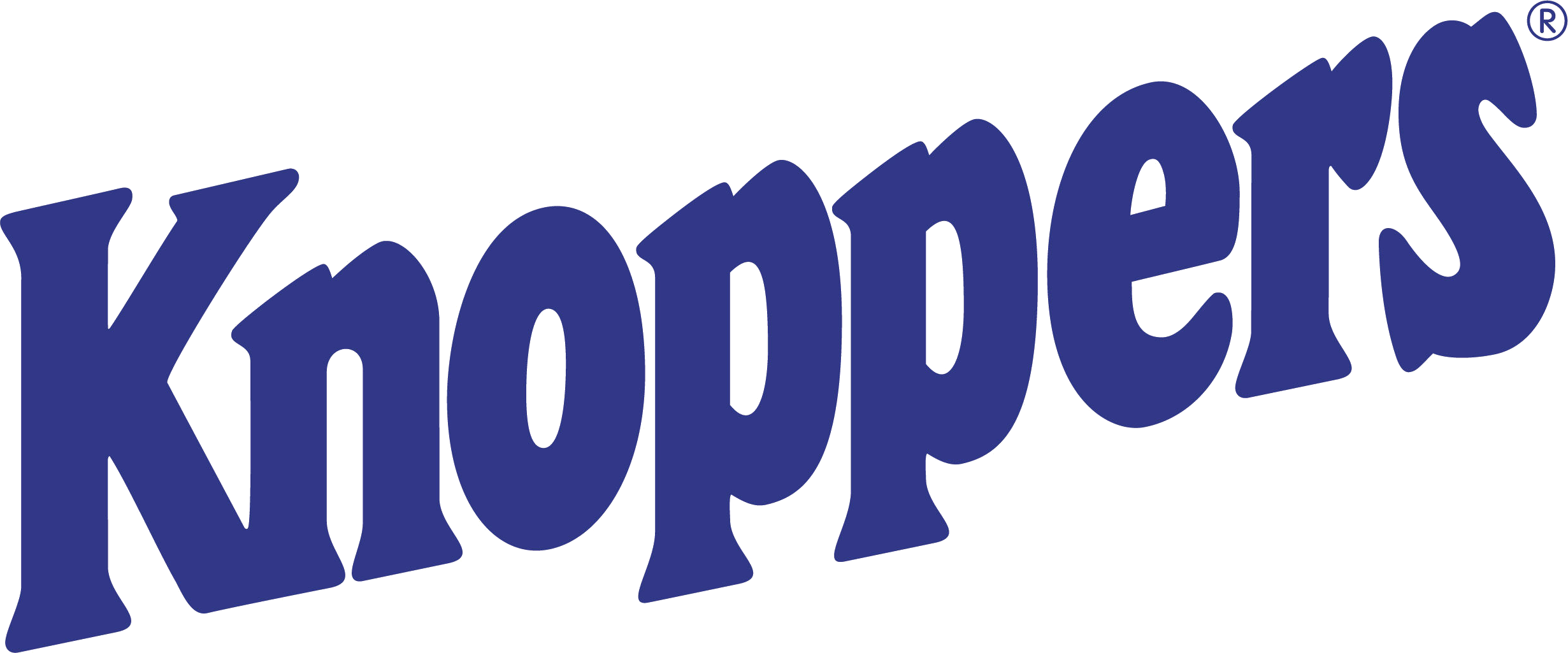

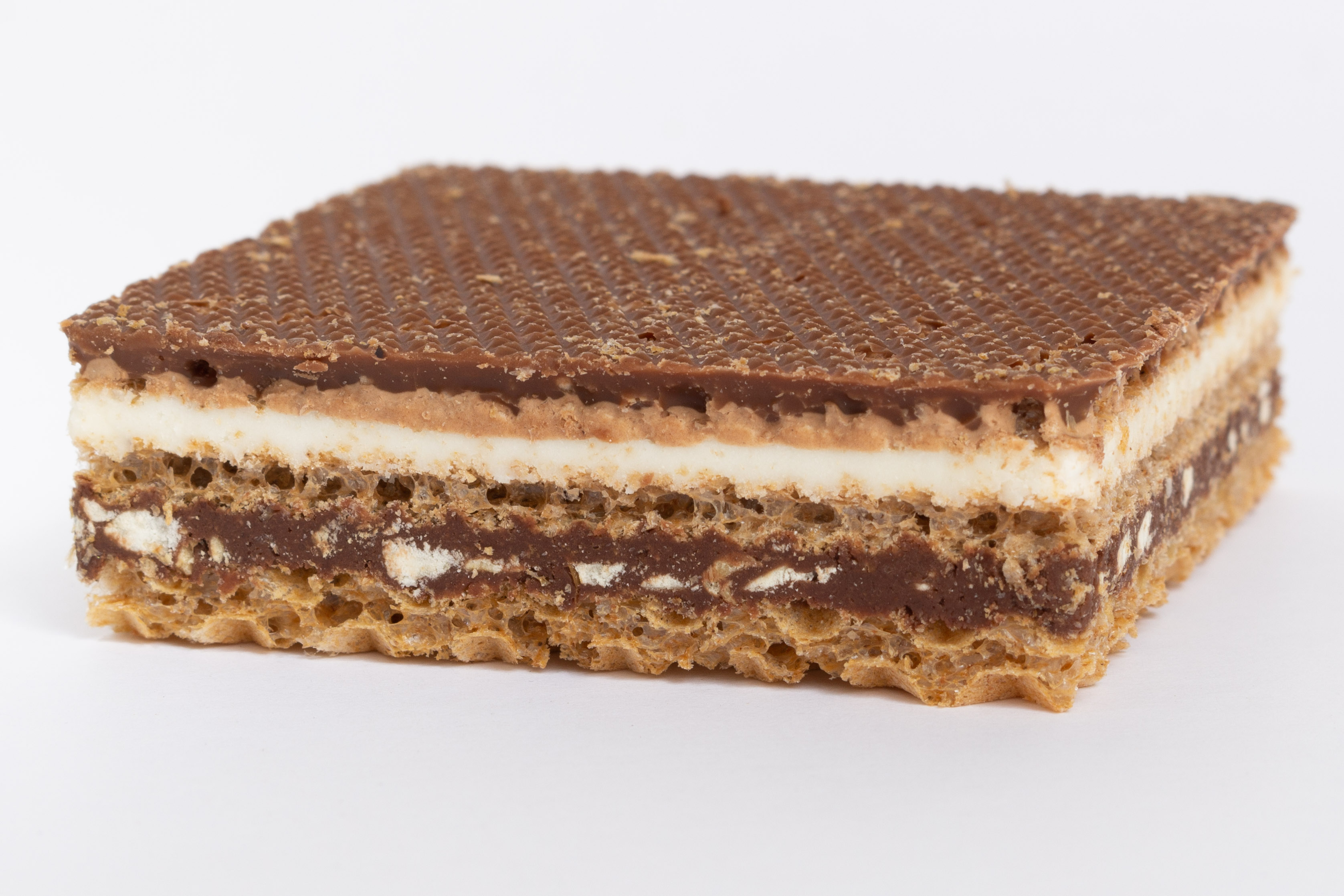
- Product type: Wafer candy bar
- Current owner: August Storck
- Country: Germany
- Introduced: June 2, 1983; 43 years ago
- Markets: Worldwide
- Tagline: "Morgens halb zehn in Deutschland" "Das Frühstückchen"
- Website: www.knoppers.com

Knoppers is a brand of wafer candy bar layered with hazelnut and milk crème, produced by August Storck, first launched in West Germany in 1983. It has since been sold in over 50 countries, mainly in Europe but also in Vietnam, Russia, Australia, New Zealand and the United States. A bar weighs 25 grams (0.9 oz) and typically has a light-blue-and-white wrapper. Knoppers is manufactured at the Ohrdruf cocoa processing plant in Thuringia.

== Composition ==
One Knoppers candy bar consists of five layers: a wafer, hazelnut crème, another wafer, milk crème, and a chocolate-covered wafer.

The ingredients are: sugar, vegetable oil, wheat flour 12%, skimmed milk powder 11,5 %, hazelnuts 9%, whole wheat flour 6%, cocoa, clarified butter 2,6 %, whey powder, wheat starch, emulsifier: soya lecithin, cream powder 0,3 %, salt, aroma, caramel. Soda ash is used as leavening.

According to the ingredient list, Knoppers may also contain [the allergens] almonds, peanuts as well as other nuts and eggs.

The overall percentage of milk contained in the wafer sandwich is 10% (milk crème filling 30.4%, nougat crème filling 29.4%).

The nutritional value per 100 grams of Knoppers (four wafers) adds up to:

Nutritional values	per 100g
Energy value	2.286 kJ/548 kcal
Protein	9 g
Carbohydrates	50,4 g
Fats	33,4 g

== Product range ==
- Knoppers – the original Knoppers comprising layers of plain wafer, chocolate wafer, hazelnut creme and milk creme. It was introduced in 1983.
- Knoppers Minis – a smaller version of Knoppers, introduced in 2004.
- Knoppers Strawberry Yoghurt – a limited edition strawberry and yoghurt flavoured version of the original Knoppers, introduced in 2015.
- Knoppers Coconut – a limited edition coconut flavoured version of the original Knoppers, introduced in 2018.
- Knoppers Black & White – a limited edition Knoppers with dark cocoa wafer, introduced in 2019.
- Knoppers NutBar – the first Knoppers chocolate bar, introduced in August 2017.
- Knoppers PeanutBar – a peanut version of the Knoppers NutBar, introduced in March 2020.
- Knoppers CoconutBar – a coconut version of the Knoppers NutBar, introduced in March 2020.

== Advertising ==
The wafer candy bar was advertised in Germany with the slogans "Morgens halb zehn in Deutschland " ("Nine thirty in the morning in Germany") and "Das Frühstückchen" ("The little breakfast").

== Popularity in China ==
Knoppers have become popular amongst Chinese consumers, with Daigous based in Germany purchasing thousands of packets of the product.

== See also ==
- List of confectionery brands
- Knoppers (Storck) : Wikipedia french
