= Toffifee =

German candy brand

- A large box of Toffifee sweets, purchased in the United Kingdom in April 2007
- Product type: Confectionery
- Current owner: August Storck KG
- Country: Germany
- Introduced: 1973
- Markets: Worldwide
- Tagline: "...there's so much fun in Toffifee!"
- Website: www.toffifee.com

Toffifee (known in the United States as Toffifay) is a German brand of caramel candies, owned by the Berlin-based German company August Storck KG. Toffifee are caramel cups containing nougat, caramel and a hazelnut, topped with a chocolate button. They are sold in boxes containing from 4 to 96 pieces.

First sold in West Germany in 1973, Toffifee were marketed as a product "for the whole family". By 2016, Toffifee were being sold in over 100 countries. In the United States, Toffifee is marketed with a different spelling, "Toffifay," and a white package design. Elsewhere in the world, including in Canada and Europe, the brand retains its original spelling and brown box design.

== See also ==
- List of confectionery brands
