= Riesen =

German caramel chocolate confectionery

- Riesen Candy
- Product type: Confectionery
- Current owner: August Storck
- Country: Germany
- Introduced: 1934; 92 years ago
- Markets: Worldwide
- Website: www.storck.us/en/brands/riesen

Riesen (/ˈriːzn/, "reason"; German pronunciation: [ˈʁiːzn̩]) (German for Giants) is a confectionery of chocolate and chocolate-flavored caramel produced and distributed by August Storck KG, a German confectioner. In the US, the candy is individually wrapped and sold in medium, large, and club-sized bags. In the UK, the toffees come loose in packs of five, and individually wrapped in sharing bags. It consists of bite-sized pieces of chewy chocolate caramel covered in dark chocolate.

== History ==
=== 1930s ===
While small corner shops in Germany still sold loose candy out of big jars, Storck introduced the first wrapped and branded caramel – the Storck 1 Pfennig Riesen. It quickly became a popular candy due to its appealing caramel taste and chewiness.

=== 1940s ===
The 1 Pfennig Riesen evolved into the 2 Pfennig RIESEN and later into Storck RIESEN. It was available in several different flavors, including chocolate caramel.

=== 1980s ===
The chocolate-caramel candy was covered in dark chocolate and became the "Chocolate Riesen." The Storck Chocolate Riesen became available in bags of individually wrapped pieces.

=== 1990s ===
The Riesen brand successfully expanded internationally and was introduced to the United States in 1991. Today, Riesen is well established in many European and North American markets, such as Germany, Scandinavia, the UK, Ireland, the United States and Canada.

=== 2000 and beyond ===
Peanut Riesen was introduced in 2001. It contained chopped peanuts in caramel covered in chocolate; however, it was discontinued in 2002 due to poor sales.

== See also ==
- List of confectionery brands
