= August Oberwelland =

German entrepreneur

August Oberwelland (born August Hermann Storck; 1859 – 20 August 1924) was a German entrepreneur and the founder of confectionery manufacturer August Storck.

== Life ==
August Oberwelland was the owner of the farm Oberwellandhof in Westphalia. Together with three workers he started his company, the German company Werther’sche Zuckerwarenfabrik, that he founded in 1903 in Werther and which produced sweet candies for Westphalia. After World War I, Hugo Oberwelland (the youngest of the three sons of August) followed his father and took over the management of the factory in 1921.

August Oberwelland was the great-grandfather of the current owner of August Storck family company, Axel Oberwelland.
