= Storck =

German confectionery company

August Storck KG
- Type: Private
- Industry: Confectionery
- Founded: 1903; 123 years ago
- Headquarters: Berlin, Germany
- Area served: Worldwide
- Key people: Axel Oberwelland (owner)
- Products: Sweets
- Number of employees: 8600
- Website: www.storck.com

August Storck KG (German pronunciation: [ˈaʊɡʊst ˈʃtoːɐ̯k]), or simply Storck, is a German confectionery producer, headquartered in Berlin, owned by Axel Oberwelland. The main facility of Storck in Germany is in Halle, North Rhine-Westphalia, with another located in Skanderborg, Denmark, and one in Ohrdruf, Germany. In 2022, the company was the second largest confectionery producer in Germany in terms of sales, and number 13 in the world.

== History ==
=== Foundation 1903–1950 ===
The company was founded in 1903 by August Storck, who later changed his name to August Oberwelland. He was the owner of the Oberwellandhof in Werther (Westphalia) and opened the Werther candy factory. With only three employees, the factory supplied candy to retailers in the surrounding area. The First World War had a negative impact on development.

In 1921, the management of the company was passed on to Hugo Oberwelland, the youngest son of the founder, who was ill at the time. In 1934, the "1 Pfennig Riesen" came onto the market, which according to the company was the first branded candy in Germany. By 1937, the number of employees had risen to 71, products were distributed throughout the country, and in 1938 the first branch opened in Schötmar. After the Second World War additional investments were made.

From 11 September 1942 to 7 September 1943, Storck operated a Frauenarbeitslager (Women's labor camp) in Werther. The camp was part of the Strafgefangenenlager Oberems (Oberems prison camp).

=== Move to Halle and introduction of brands 1950–1990 ===
After the war, a new factory was built in neighbouring Halle (Westphalia), which was considered to be an "industrial plant in the countryside" when it was built. By reforesting the area, voluntary compensatory measures were implemented, which since then has been made a requirement in planning approval procedures and development plans in Germany. The factory received a rail connection to the Haller Willem railway line. Storck bought its own tank wagons for the transport of raw materials and closed freight wagons for the transport of finished goods.

In 1949, the "Storck 2 Pfennig Riesen" came onto the market. In 1950, Storck introduced a performance-related bonus for employees. In the course of the Wirtschaftswunderjahren (Economic miracle), both the number of employees and the production volume increased. In 1953, exports and in 1954, chocolate production began. In 1958, Storck introduced social benefits for employees. The second generation change took place in 1971, when Klaus Oberwelland took over the management of the company. In 1975, Storck introduced a company pension plan.

From 1962 onward, the company developed many of its most important brands to this day within two decades with nimm2 (1962), Merci (1965), Campino (1966), Werther's Original (1969, sold in Germany until 1998 under the name Werthers Echte) and Toffifee (1973). Storck later took over the Dickmann company (1981) and developed the Knoppers brand (1983).

=== Recent developments 1990–present ===
In 1988, Storck took over the traditional company Bendicks of Mayfair from Winchester in England. In 1993, a new production facility was built in Ohrdruf, Thuringia. Further market launches followed, including merci Crocant (1994), merci Pur (1995) and nimm2 Lachgummi (1996). In 1998, the company was restructured, and management was moved to Berlin.

The third generation change took place in 2003. Axel Oberwelland has been chairman of the management of August Storck KG since then, which is the parent company for the national subsidiaries. Another market launch since the change was Chocolat Pavot (2003).

In 2005, Storck acquired the rights to the Rachengold and Atemgold brands from the Karlsruhe company Ragolds. August Storck KG's turnover was 1.2 billion euros that year.

For its 100th anniversary, Storck developed a new company logo and slogan "Part of Your World". In addition, the name Storck has been printed on every brand packaging since then.

From 2009, the previously independent sales companies Storck, Merci and Dickmann were gradually merged and a new pricing system was introduced.

After Axel Oberwelland became CEO of Storck in 2003, brand management at the company changed from a purely single-brand strategy (one brand with one product) to numerous products under the same brand. Examples of this are the new variants of Werthers Original with Eclair, Caramel and Vanilla Cream. In the chocolate sector, numerous new variants were also launched under the merci Petits or the core merci brand.

On 1 January 2014, long-time managing director Robert Mähler left the company.

In 2023, the company built a logistics centre near the A33 and an additional factory entrance so that arriving trucks no longer have to drive through Halle (Westphalia).

As of 2025, Storck continues its business operations in Russia despite international sanctions imposed after Russia's invasion of Ukraine in 2022. This decision has been met with criticism, as many companies have ceased operations in Russia in response to the conflict, which has caused immense civilian suffering and destruction in Ukraine. Storck has not only maintained its presence in the Russian market but has also reportedly increased its chocolate exports to the country, with a 51% rise in export value from March 2022 to March 2023. Storck, according to critics, prioritizes financial gain over morality, undermining international efforts to isolate Russia financially and press it to end its aggression. The company's continued sales in Russia have raised ethical concerns about the responsibility of the company during times of humanitarian crises.

== Brands ==
These are the most well-known products and the corresponding year in which they launched:

- Bazooka (1970s to late 1980s under license from the Topps Company)
- Bendicks
- Campino (1966)
- Château chocolate, produced for Aldi
- Chocolat Pavot (English: Chocolate Poppy) (2003)(until 2010)
- Euka Menthol
- ICE fresh
- Kaufrüchtchen (English: Chewy Little Fruits)
- Knoppers (1983)
- Lachgummi
- Mamba
- Merci (1965)
  - Merci Crocant (English: Crispy Thank You) (1994)
  - Merci Petits (English: Little Thank Yous) (formerly Merci Pur)
- Milkfuls
- Minis zuckerfrei (English: Sugar-free Minis)
- Moser-Roth chocolate (1902), revived 2007 and produced exclusively for Aldi
- Nimm2 (English: Take2) (1962)
  - Nimm2 Lachgummi (English: Take2 Laughing Chews) (1996)
  - Nimm2 soft (2005)
- Riesen (English: Giants) (1930s; chocolate-covered version, late 1980s)
- Toffifee (known in the US as Toffifay) (1973)
- Werther's Original (1969)
- Dickmann's (Schokokuss)

=== WIHA ===
The Storck Group also includes the WIHA GmbH which produces exclusively for Aldi.

== Trivia ==
- In the 1970s, a purple cartoon bear named Schleck advertised Mamba, Bazooka, Riesen and similar products.
- In the mid-1980s, actor Götz George used his image as Tatort inspector Horst Schimanski to endorse Paroli.
- Since 2021, Thomas Müller has been active as a brand ambassador for the Storck brand Knoppers, Mats Hummels joined in 2022.
- August Storck KG made a large donation to the Christian Democratic Union (CDU) in both 2024 and 2025. The party stated that it had received a total of 175,000 euros.
- Storck employs a company fire brigade founded in 1954, which consists of 28 people.

== Controversy ==
In February 2020, part of the company premises in Halle (Westphalia) was occupied. The reason was the planned clearing of a piece of forest on Steinhausener Weg on the factory site. Forest squatters erected platforms and high-wire structures on the trees of the forest they called Steini. The barricade couldn't be cleared due to the squatters' disobedience towards the forest workers and the police's lack of willingness. A new occupation took place at the beginning of the woodland clearing season in October 2021. Activists again occupied trees in the forest and built tree houses. The protest was directed against climate change and August Storck's unwillingness to disclose its supply chains. On 6 January 2022, one of the tree houses was cleared and a section of the forest was cut. Due to the destruction of natural and forest areas associated with the expansion of the company premises, Storck plans to develop parts of the Warmenau river and 5.5 hectares of adjacent land in a natural way. In addition, in 2022 Storck uncovered the Laibach stream, which ran through a pipe on the company premises. In the Chocolate Scorecard, a comparative overview of the environmental and social circumstances of the production of chocolate companies led by Australian universities, the company received the Rotten Egg Award and came second last among 38 companies in 2023.

== See also ==
- List of bean-to-bar chocolate manufacturers
