= Werther's Original =

Brand of caramel flavoured candy

Coordinates: 52°34′36″N 13°19′23″E

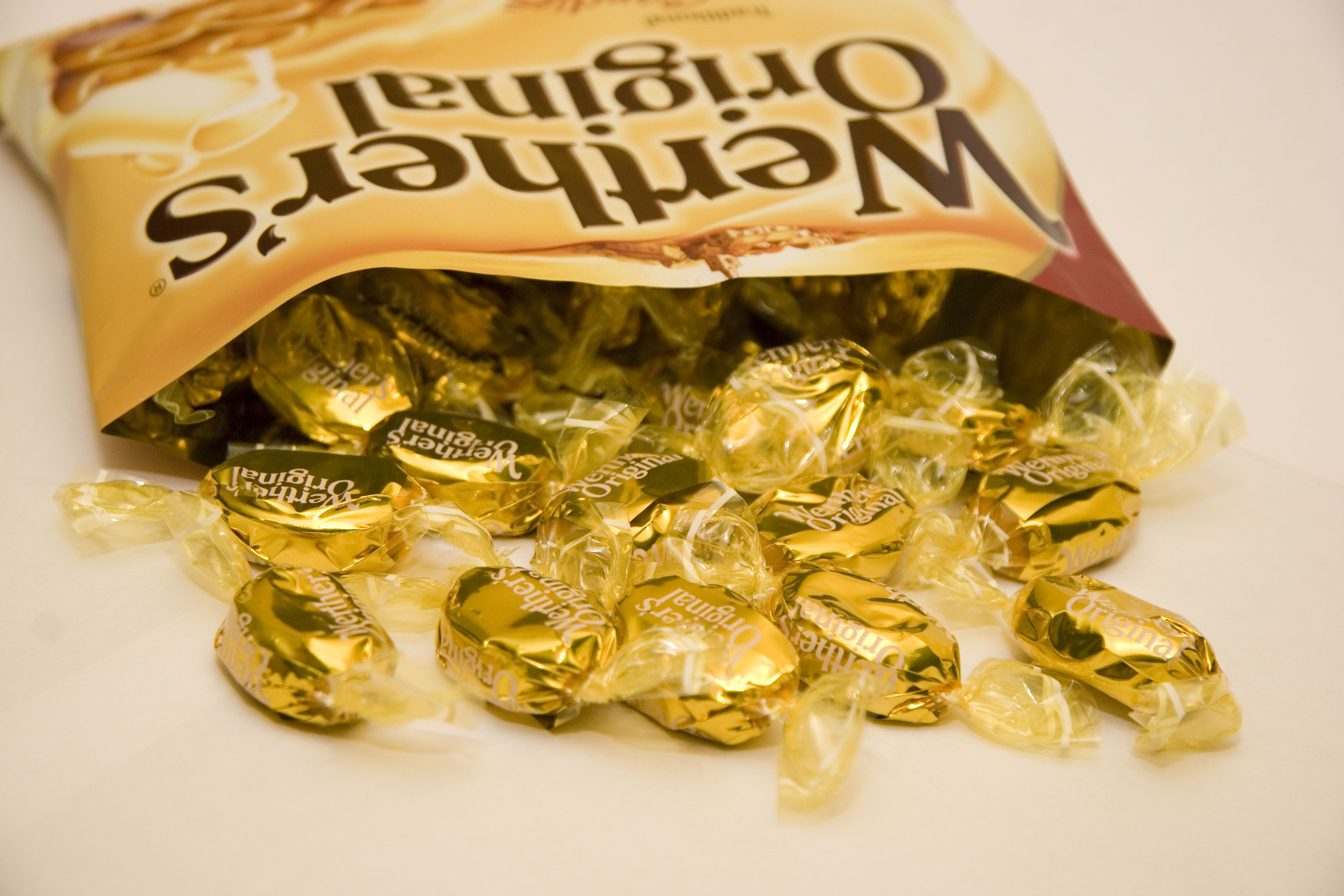
- An opened bag of Werther's Originals
- Product type: Confectionery
- Current owner: August Storck
- Country: Germany
- Introduced: 1969; 57 years ago
- Markets: Worldwide
- Website: www.werthers-original.com

Werther's Original (from the original German: Werthers Echte) is a brand of caramel and butter confectionery owned by the German company August Storck, based in Berlin, Germany. The candy is popular in Europe, the UK, and North America.

== History ==
The sweet brand is named after the town of Werther in Westphalia, where the company was founded in 1903. Starting in 1969 the candy was marketed under the brand name Werthers Echte. The name Werther's Original was adopted in the 1990s for the international market. They are now manufactured nearby, in the town of Halle, as well as at the Ohrdruf plant in Thuringia.

== Product ==
The original Werthers Echte was a caramel hard candy.

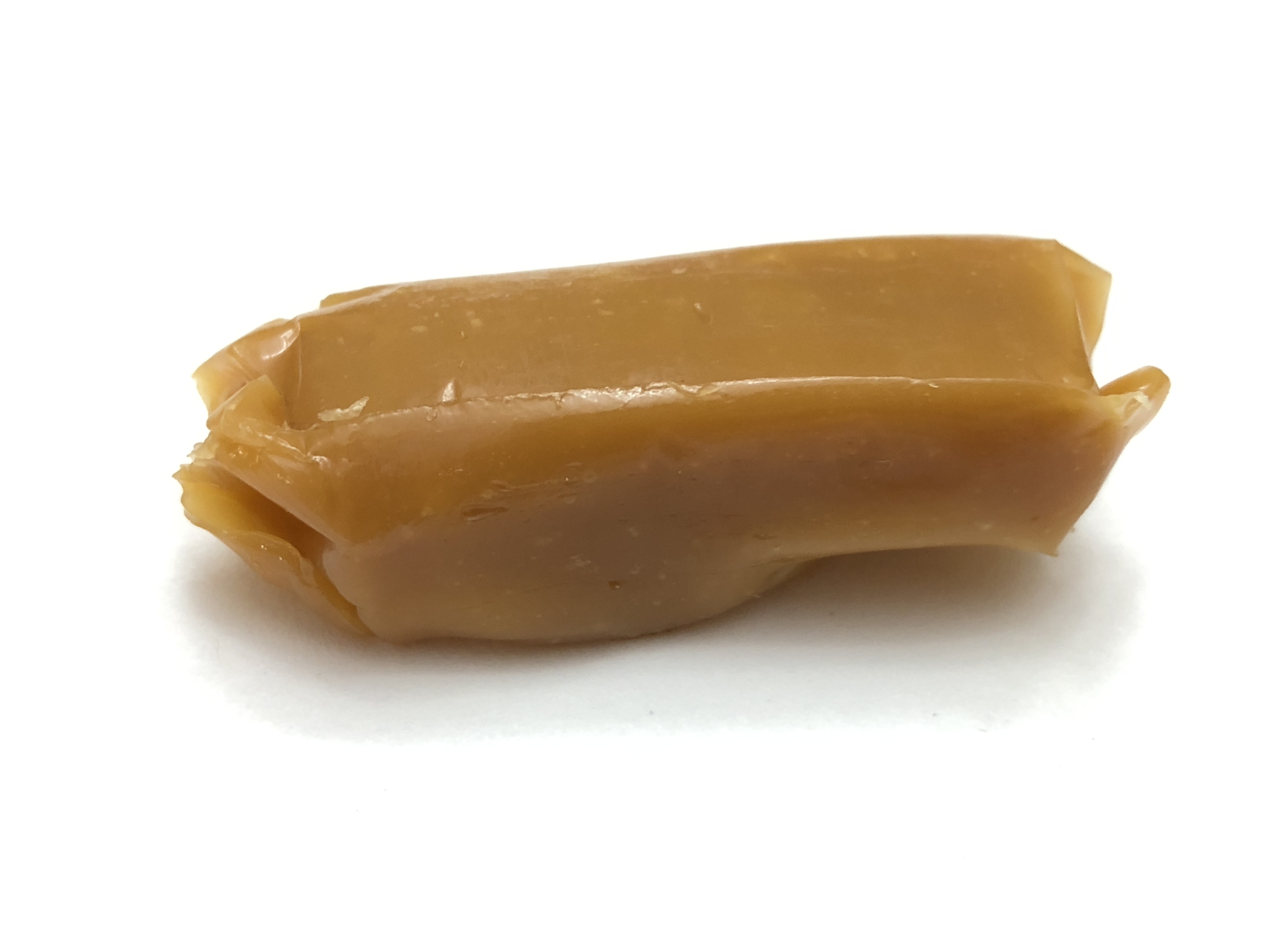
A "Soft Caramel"

Later variants included chewy toffees and a soft, waxy form which melts easily inside the mouth called "butterscotch-melts." A variant with chocolate filling is also available, as well as three sugarless variants that use isomalt as a sugar substitute: the original butterscotch flavour, a butterscotch coffee swirl, and a butterscotch mint swirl.

A product available in the United Kingdom is "Werther's Chocolate," a dark and milk chocolate with butterscotch running through it, sold in the same packaging and wrappers as Werther's Originals. A variant available in Canada and the United States, "Butterscotch Apple Filled," has a green-apple-flavored filling.

== Commercials ==
Well-known TV advertisements in Germany and the United Kingdom from the late 1980s featured an older man offering Werther's butterscotch to a boy. The actor Arnold Peters appeared in them. In the United States commercials, TV actor Robert Rockwell played the kind-hearted grandfather. One of these ads was dubbed into Japanese and aired in Japan in the early 2000s. Its off-putting voice acting led to it becoming an Internet meme in Japan on sites such as 2channel and Nico Nico Douga. One British advertisement consisted of a montage of the grandfather and grandson bonding together (for example, pointing at animals out of train windows). The lyrics of the song which accompanied this ended: "When one who loves you says to you: You're someone very special too."
