= List of confectionery brands =

This is a list of brand name confectionery products. Sugar confectionery includes candies (sweets in British English), candied nuts, chocolates, chewing gum, bubble gum, pastillage, and other confections that are made primarily of sugar. In some cases, chocolate confections (confections made of chocolate) are treated as a separate category, as are sugar-free versions of sugar confections. The words candy (US and Canada), sweets (UK and Ireland), and lollies (Australia and New Zealand) are common words for the most common varieties of sugar confectionery.

== A ==
- Allen's
  - Minties
  - Fantales
- Anthon Berg
- Arcor
- Almond Joy
- August Storck
- Anthony Thomas Candy Company
  - Chocolate Buckeyes

== B ==
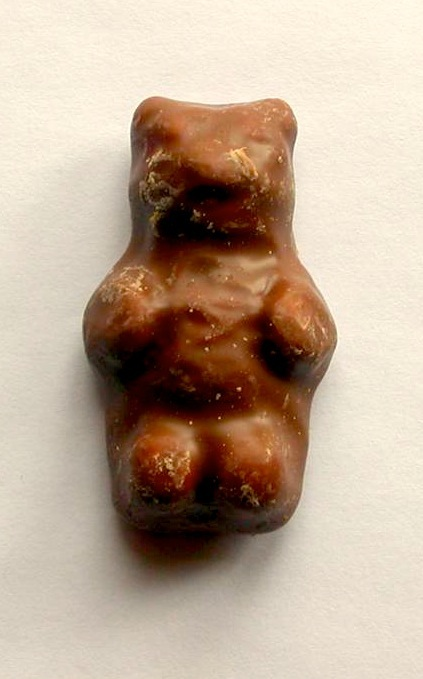
A Bamsemums confectionery

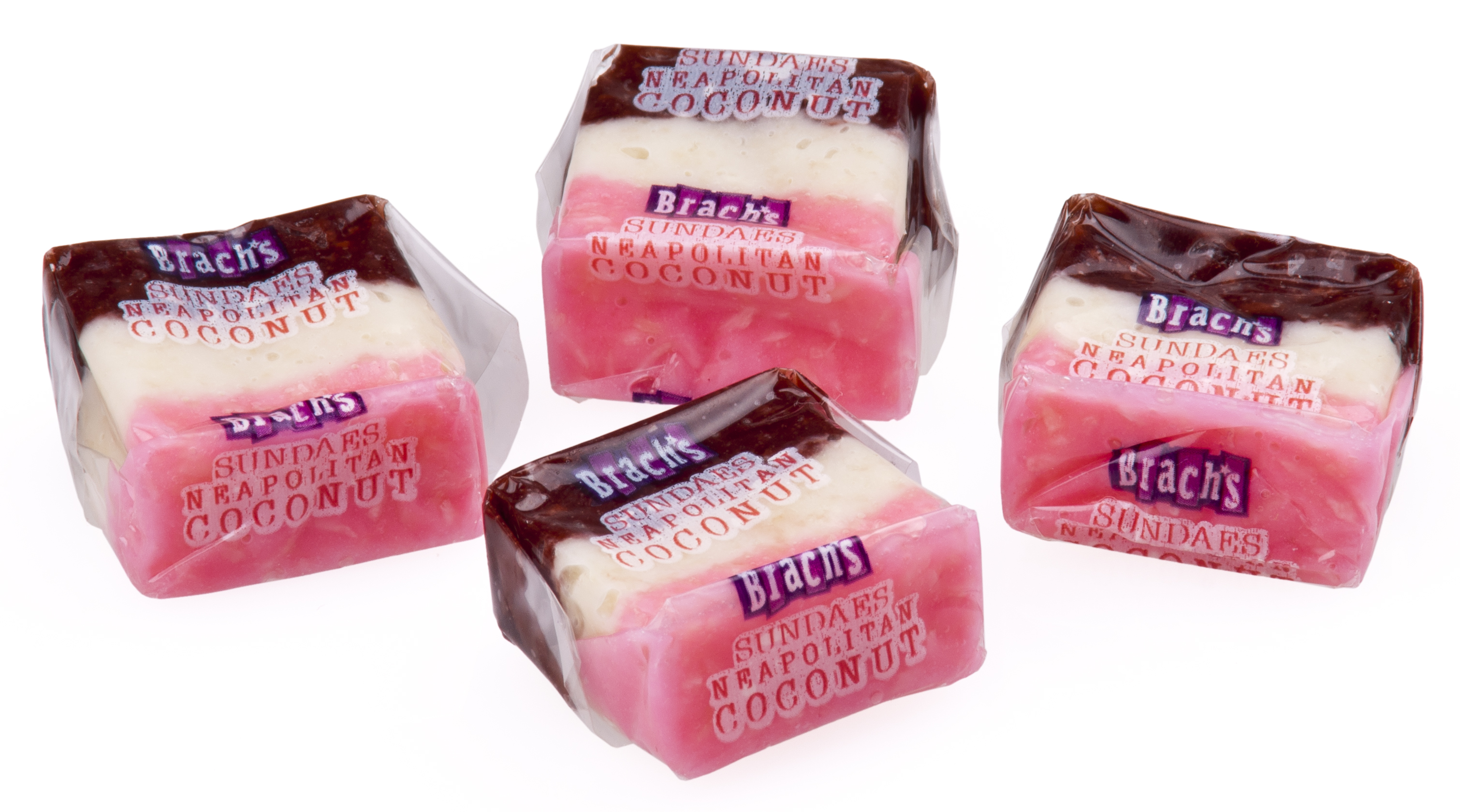
Brach's Sundaes Neapolitan Coconut, out of production since 2012

- Bamsemums
- Banjo
- Barambo
- Barratt
  - Black Jacks
  - Dolly Mixture
  - Flumps
  - Fruit Salad
  - Refreshers (compressed tablet, see also Swizzels Matlow Refreshers)
  - Sherbet Fountain
- Bassett's
  - Jelly Babies
  - Liquorice allsorts
- Bazooka (gum)
- Betty Crocker (General Mills)
  - Dunkaroos
  - Fruit by the Foot
  - Fruit Gushers
  - Fruit Roll-Ups
- Bonbon
- Boyer
  - Mallo Cup
- Brach's
- Bulls-eyes

== C ==
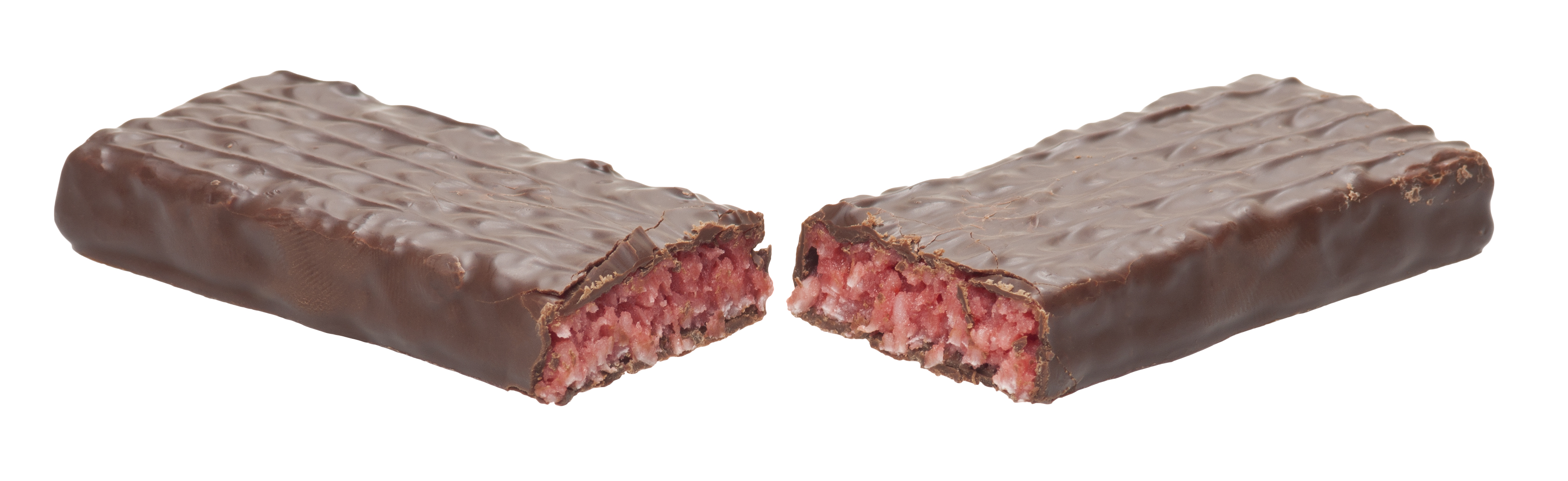
A split Cherry Ripe

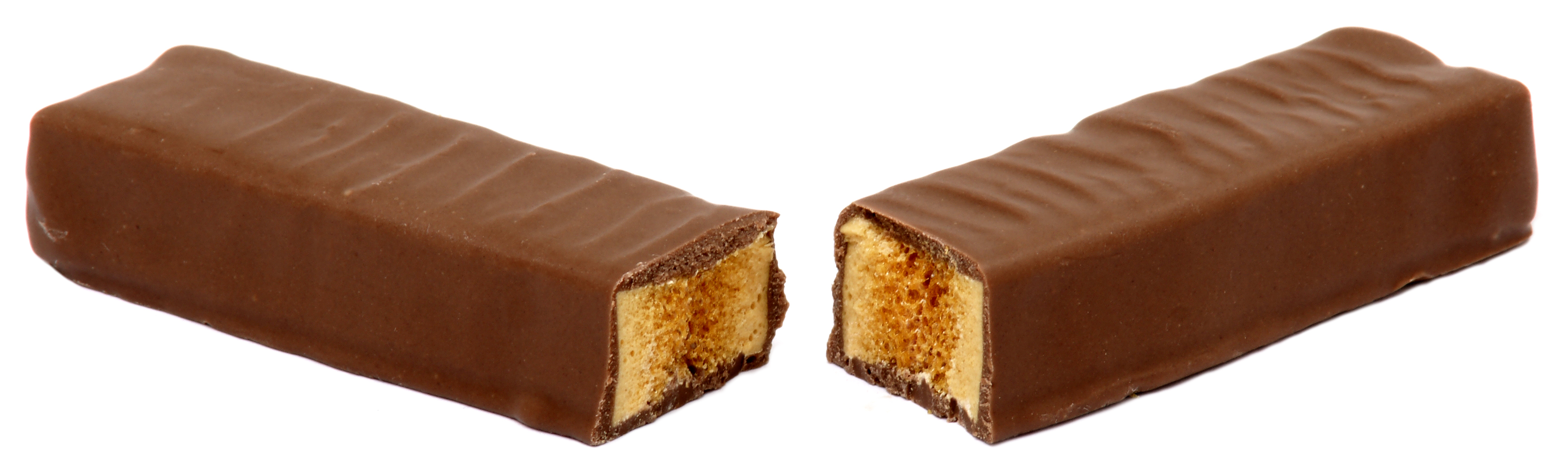
A split Crunchie

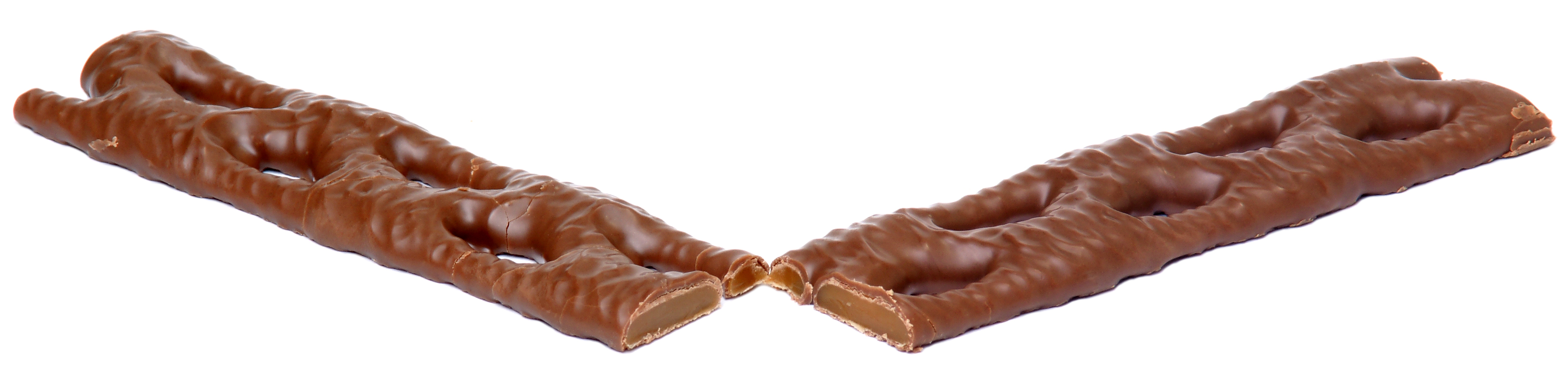
A split Curly Wurly

- Cadbury
  - Amazin' Raisin – a British chocolate-covered raisin product produced by Cadbury in the 1970s
  - Bubblicious
  - Creme egg
  - Cherry Ripe
  - Crunchie
  - Curly Wurly
  - Dairy Milk
  - Eclairs
  - Flake
  - Freddo
  - Freshen Up Gum
  - Picnic
  - Pyramint
  - Roses
  - Starbar
  - Twirl
  - Wispa
- Candy Buttons
- Campino
- Chewits
- Choco Treasure

== D ==
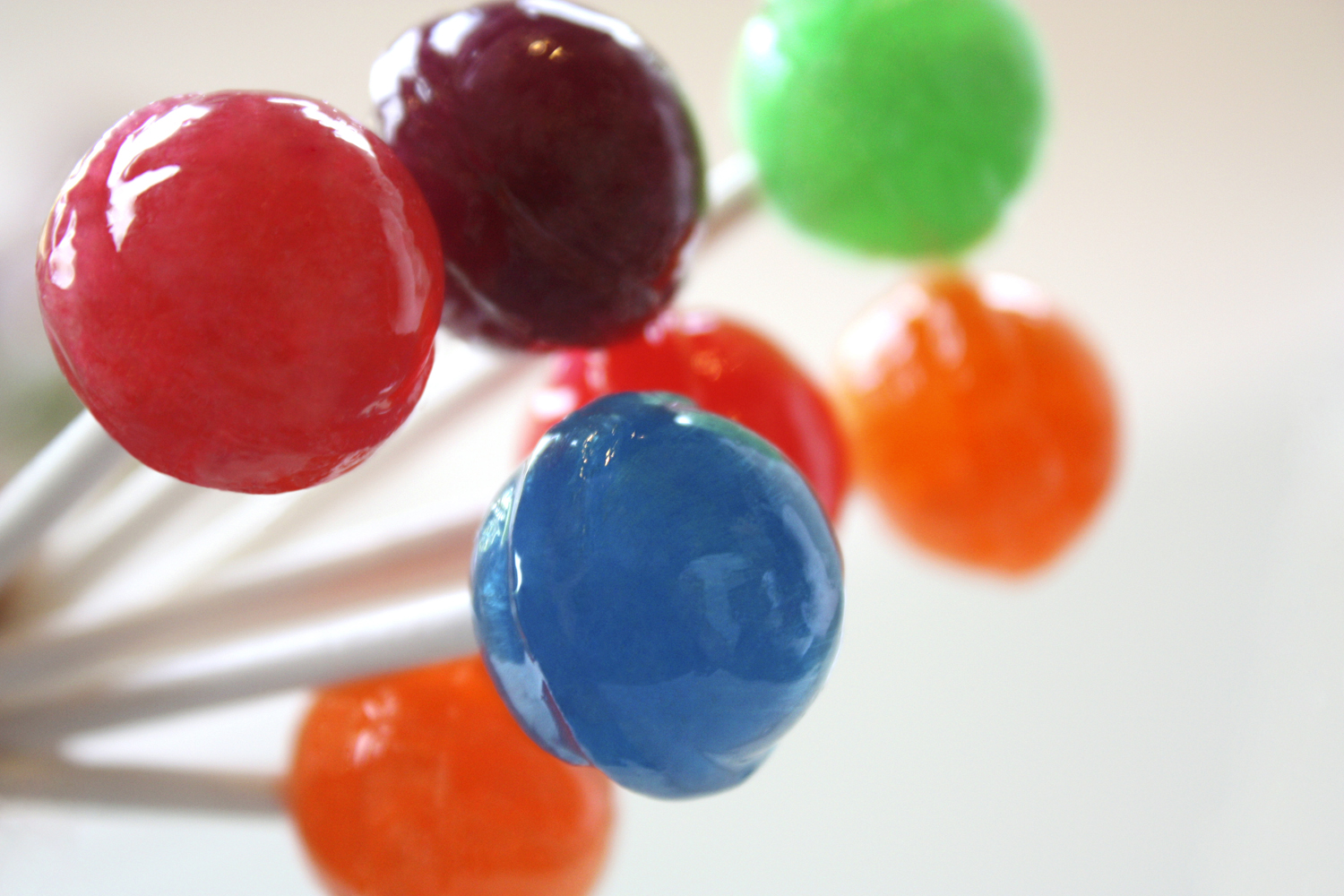
Unwrapped Dum Dums

- Daim bar
- Darrell Lea
- Dubble Bubble
- Dum Dums
- Dove Chocolate
- Doublemint

== E ==
- Everton mints

== F ==
- Farrah's Harrogate toffee

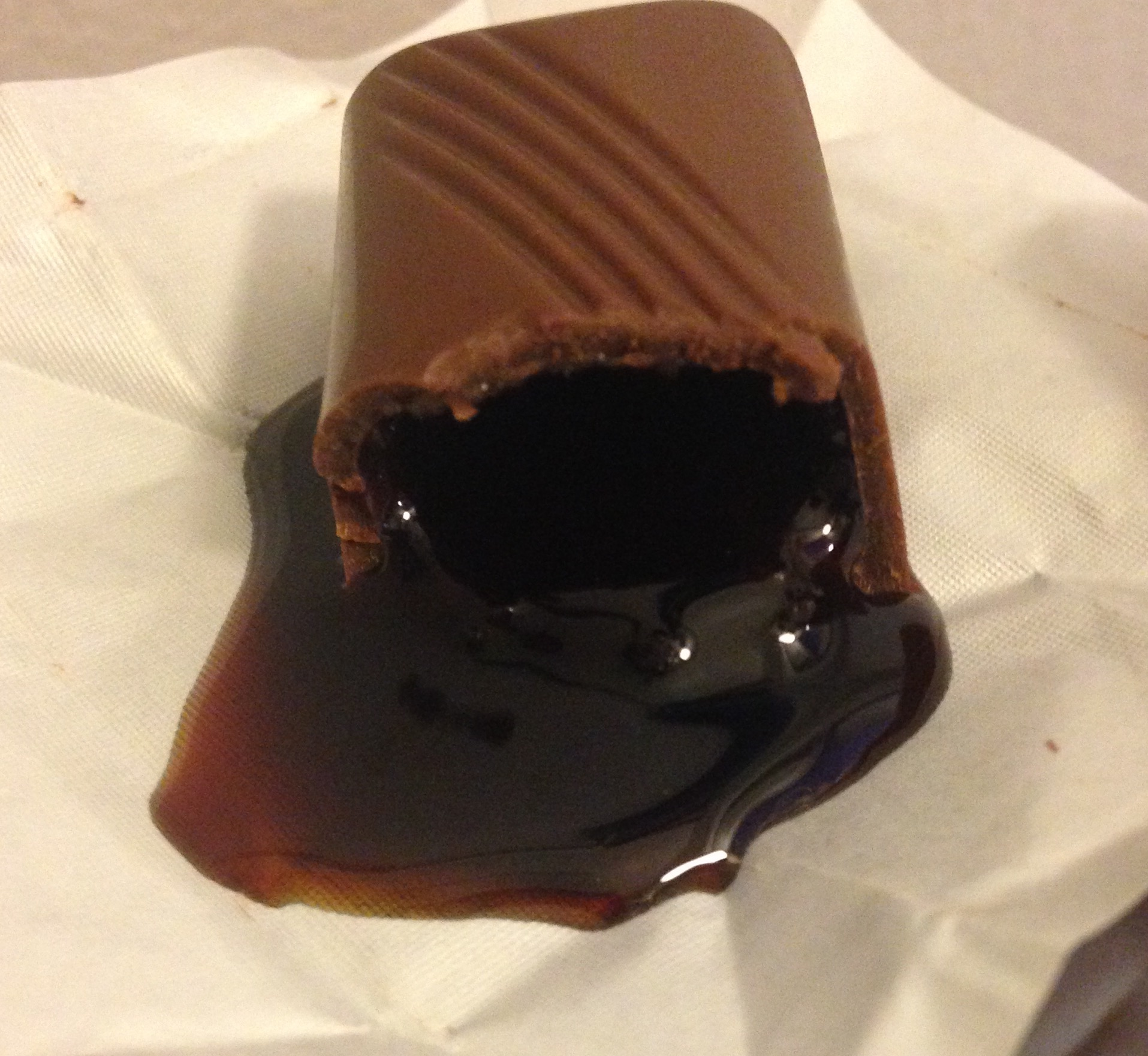
Pocket Coffee has a liquid center.

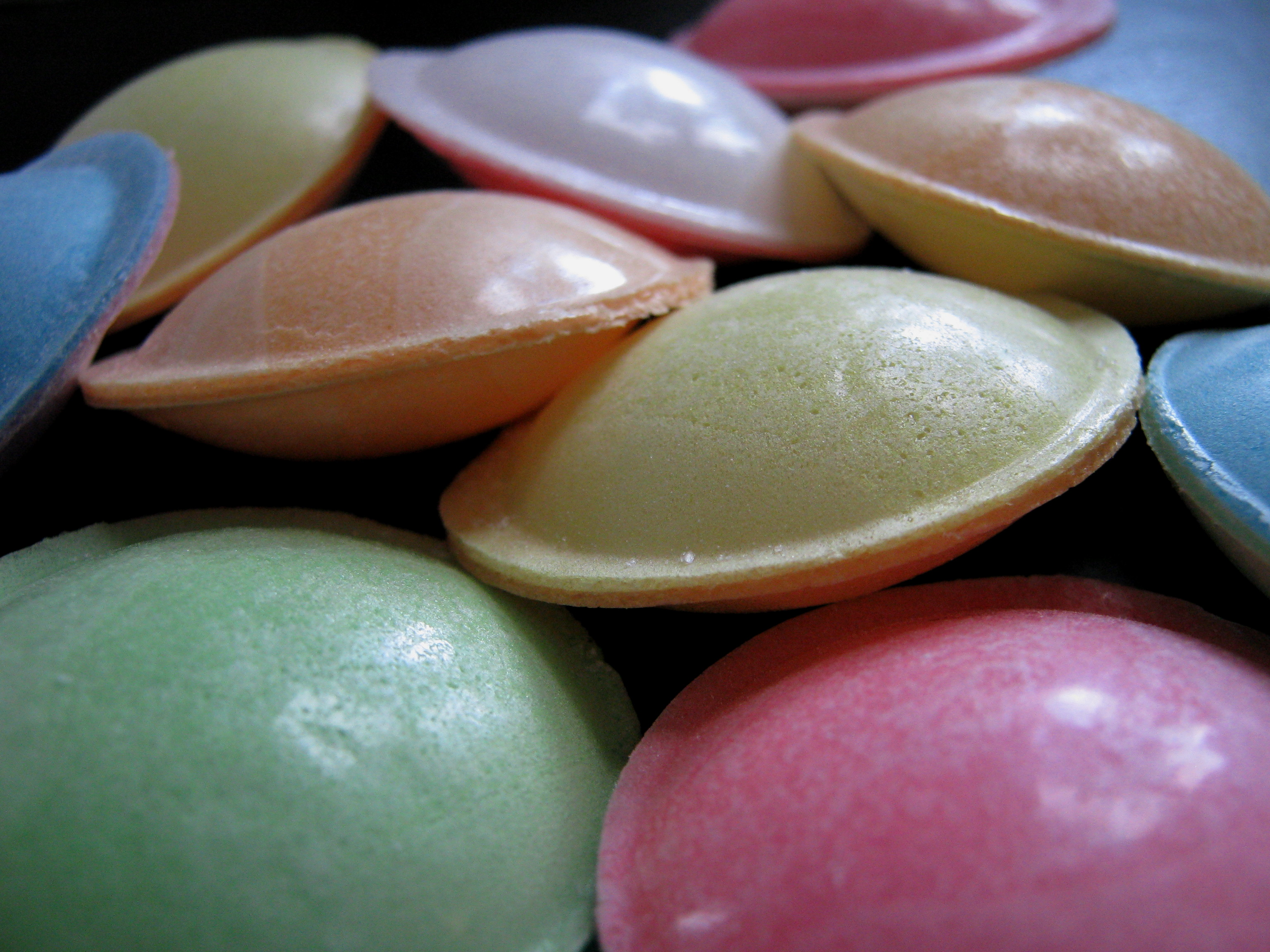
Flying saucer candies

- Feastables
- Ferrero
  - Rocher
  - Kinder Bueno
  - Kinder Egg
  - Lemonhead
  - Mon Chéri
  - Nutella
  - Raffaello
  - Tic Tac
  - Ferrara
    - 100 Grand Bar
    - Chunky
    - Atomic Sour Balls
    - Baby Ruth
    - Bobs Candies
    - Butterfinger
    - Chuckles
    - Fruit Stripe
    - Great Bite
    - Jujyfruits
- Fini — A Spanish confection company which mainly markets to Brazil
- Fisherman's Friend
- Flying Saucers
- FruChocs

== G ==
- Ganong Bros.
- Ezaki Glico — Known as Glico, also the name of a specific candy.
  - TCHO — A US chocolatier owned by Glico
  - Pocky
- Godiva
- Goldenberg's Peanut Chews
- Goplana
- Grether's Pastilles

== H ==
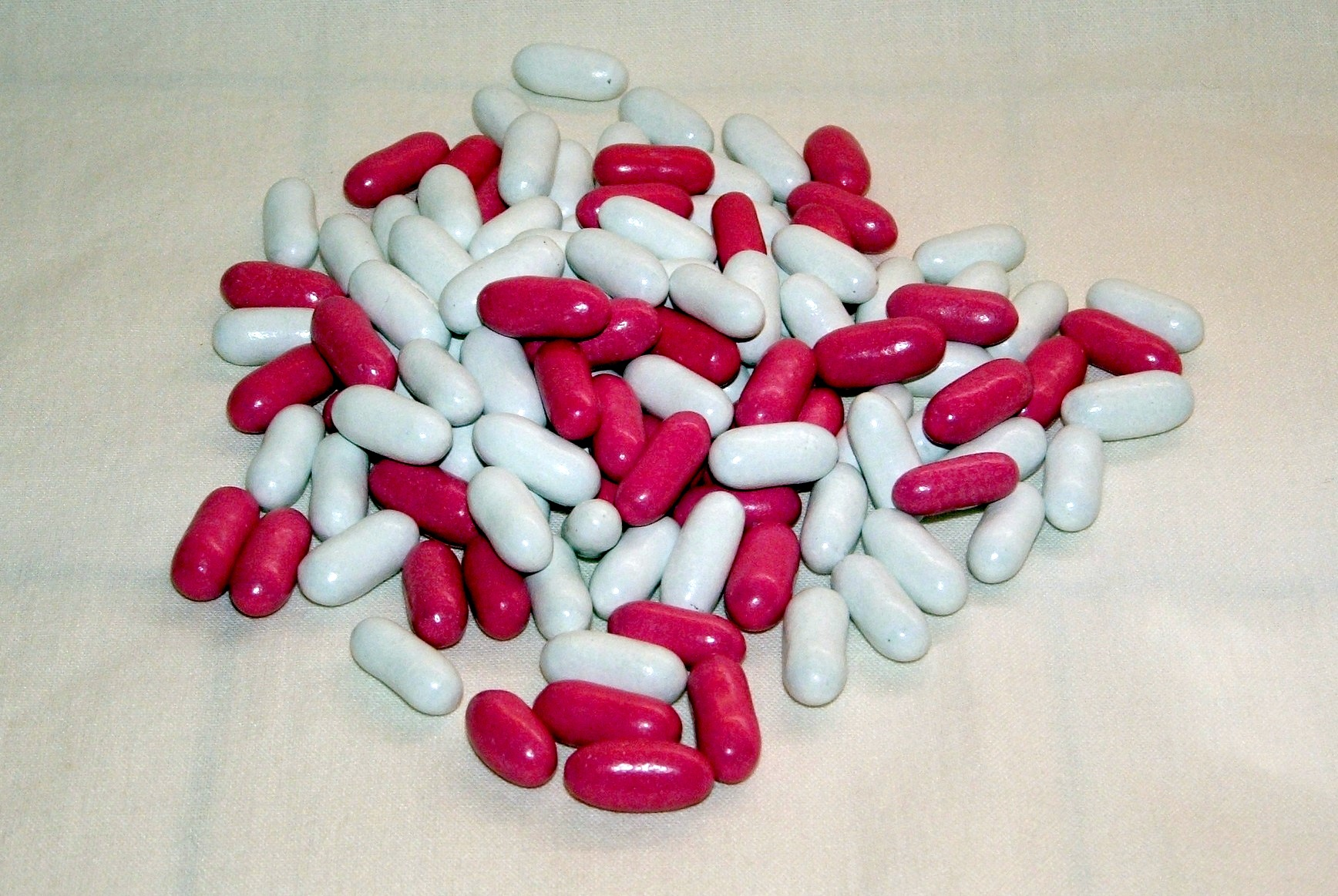
Good & Plenty consists of black licorice coated with a hard candy shell.

- Haribo
  - Goldbears (original brand of gummy bears)
  - Maoam
- Haviland Thin Mints
- Hershey's
  - 5th Avenue
  - Almond Joy
  - Good & Fruity
  - Good & Plenty
  - Heath Bar
  - Hershey bar
  - Ice Breakers
  - Jolly Rancher
  - Kisses
  - Krackel
  - Milk Duds
  - Mounds
  - Mr. Goodbar
  - PayDay
  - Reese's Pieces
  - Reese's Peanut Butter Cups
  - Rolo
  - Skor
  - Take 5
  - Twizzlers
  - Whatchamacallit
  - Whoppers
  - York Peppermint Pattie
  - Zero
- Hippy Sippy
- Hopje
- Hot Tamales
- Humbugs

== I ==
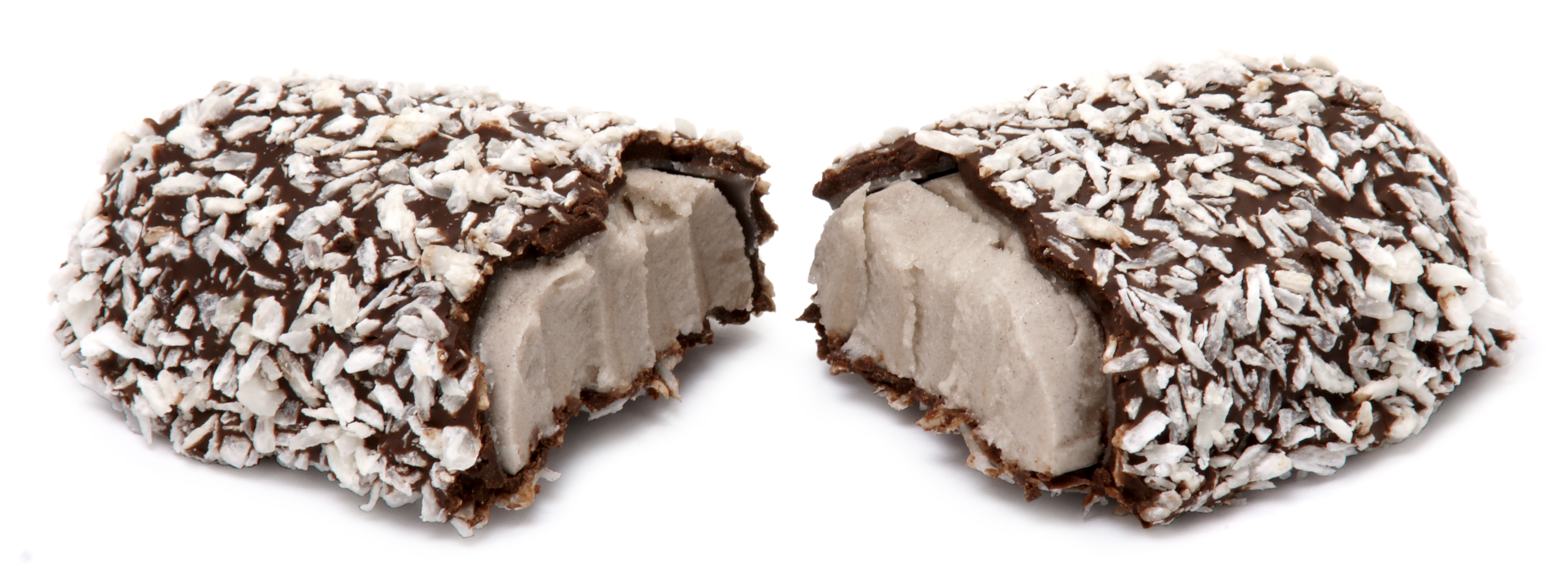
A split Idaho Spud

- Ipso
- Idaho Spud

== J ==
- Joray Fruit Rolls

== K ==
- K Bar
- Kino
- Kit Kat
- Knoppers
- Konti Group
- Kopiko
- Krasny Oktyabr

== L ==
- Lindt & Sprüngli
  - Ghirardelli Chocolate Company
  - Lindor
  - Russell Stover Candies
- Lacasa

== M ==
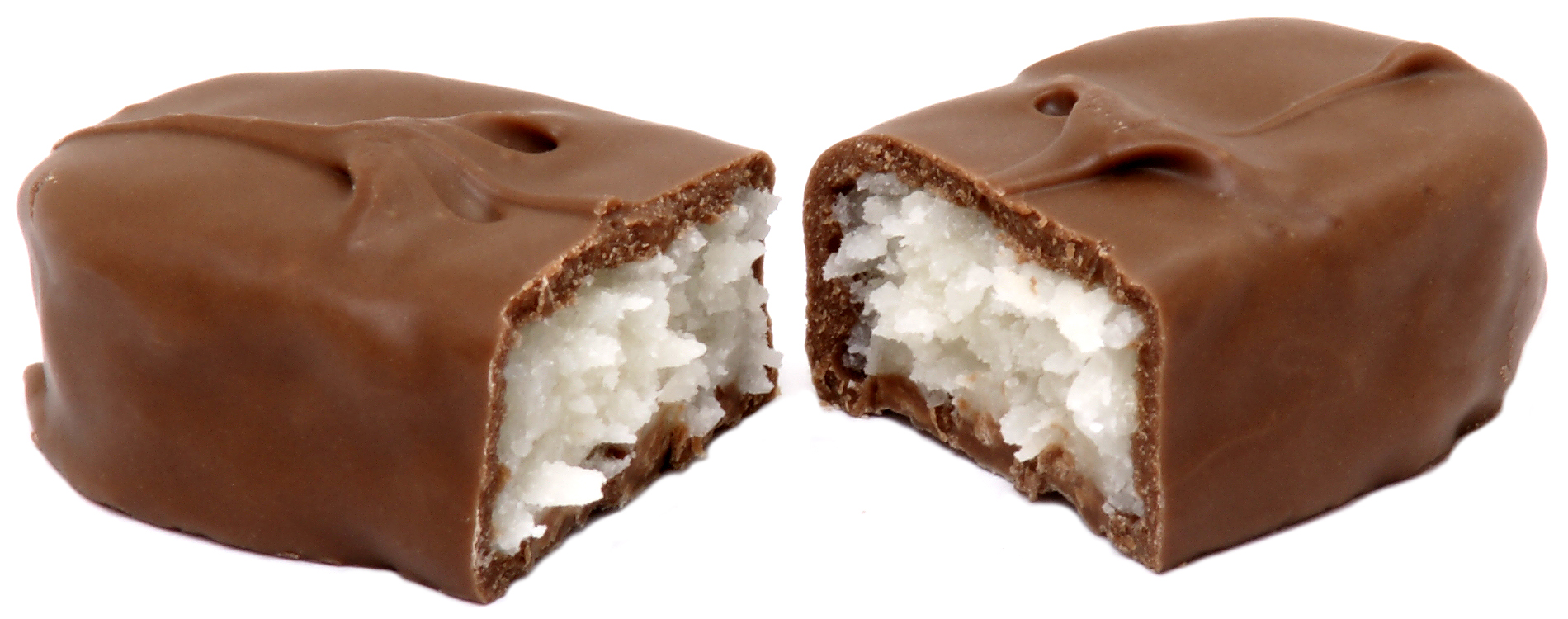
A split Bounty

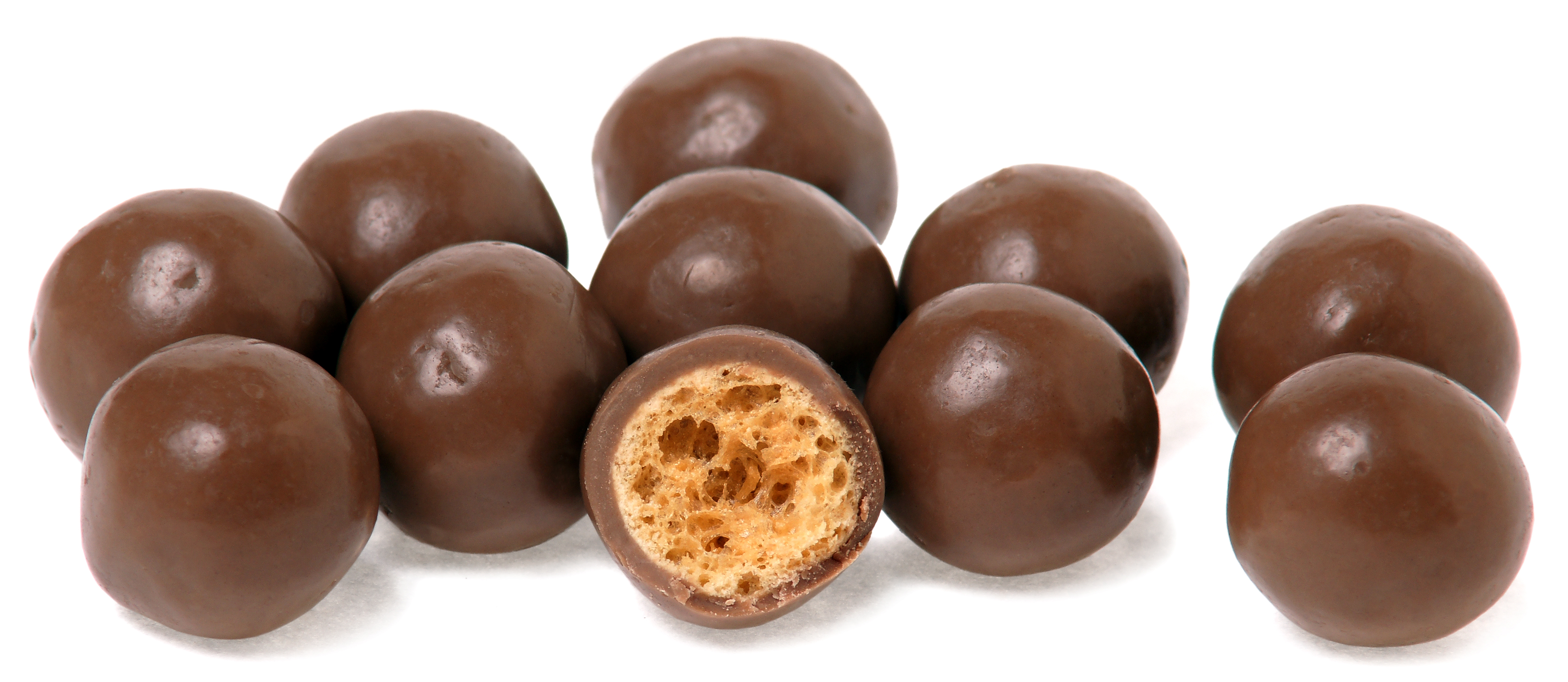
Maltesers

- Mars
  - 3 Musketeers
  - Bounty
  - Dove
  - Galaxy
  - Maltesers
  - Mars Bar
  - M&M's
  - Milky Way
  - Pacers/Opal Mints
  - Revels
  - Snickers
  - Starburst/Opal fruits
  - Twix
  - Wrigley's
    - Chewing gum
    - Doublemint
    - Hubba Bubba
    - Life Savers
    - Lockets
    - Skittles
- Maynards
  - Sports Mixture
  - Wine gum
- McCowan's
- Meiji Seika Pharma (Meiji)
  - Hello Panda
  - Yan Yan
- Mike and Ike
- Milkfuls
- Mr. Tom

== N ==
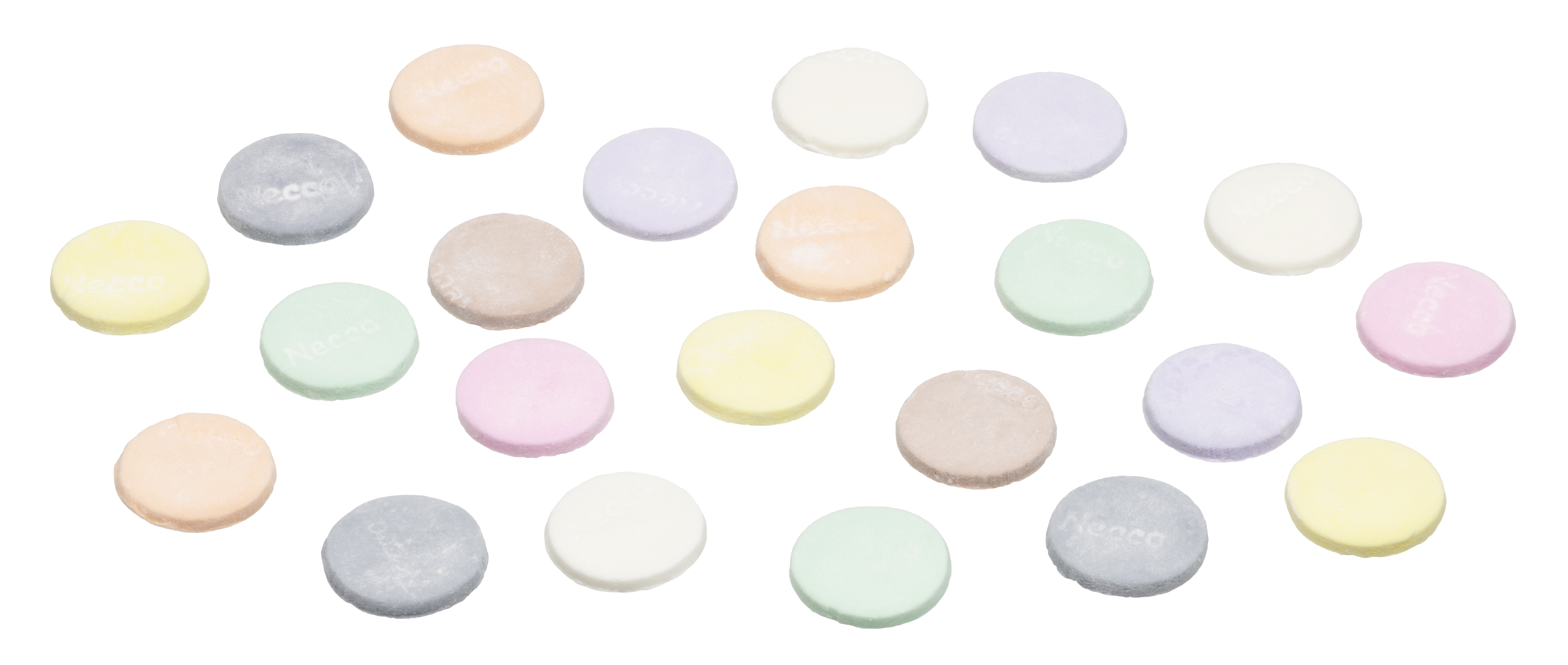
Necco Wafers

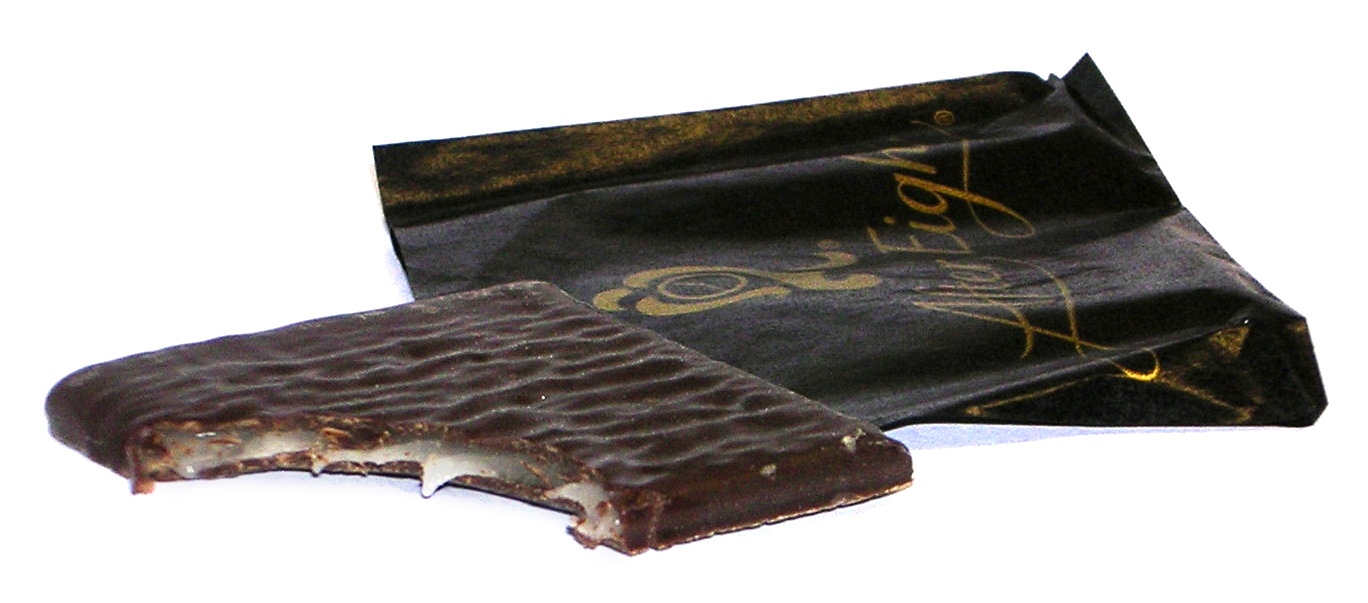
An After Eight thin mint

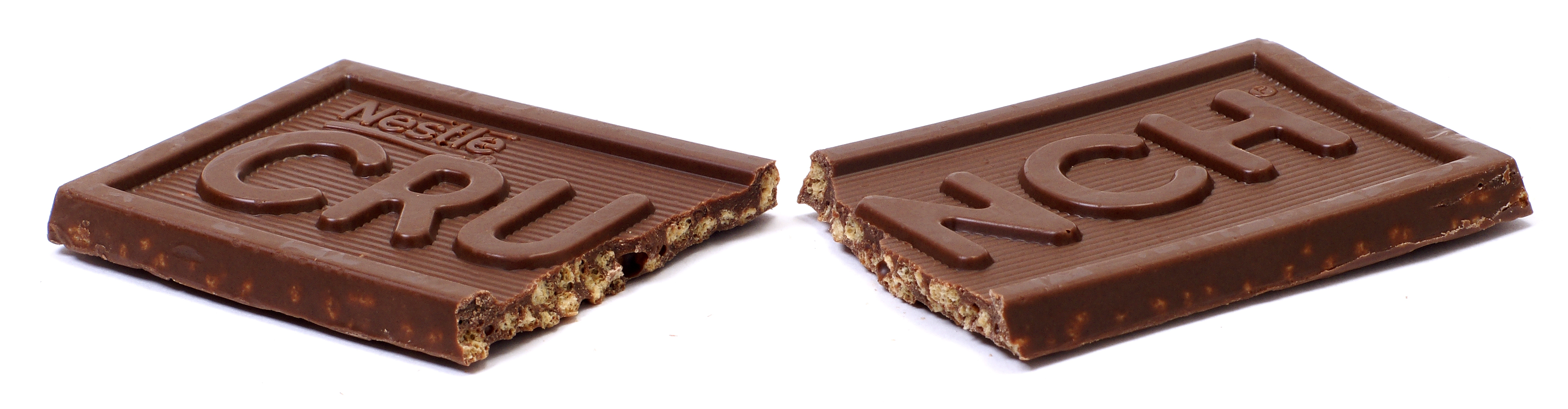
A split Nestlé Crunch bar

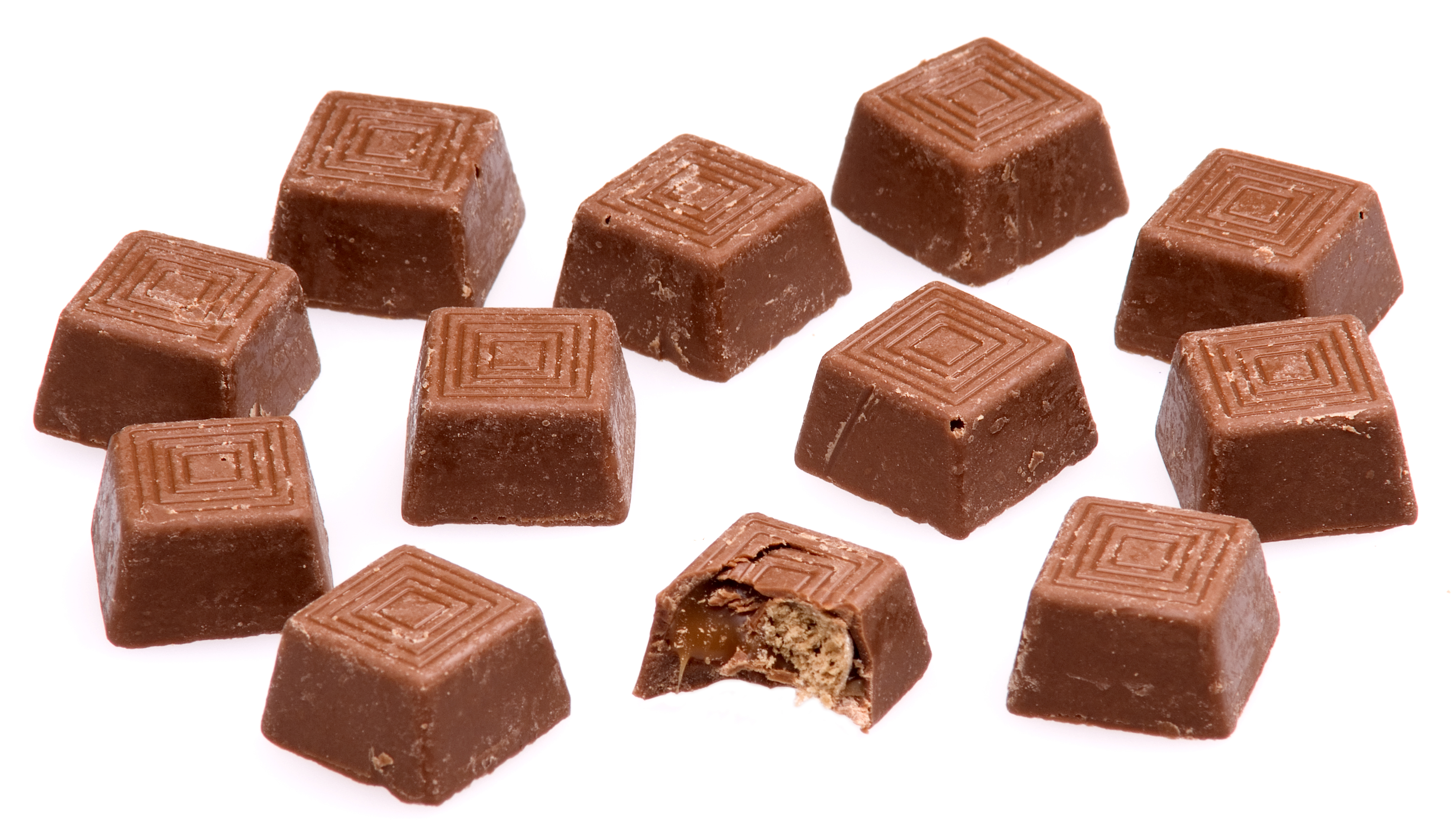
Nestlé Munchies

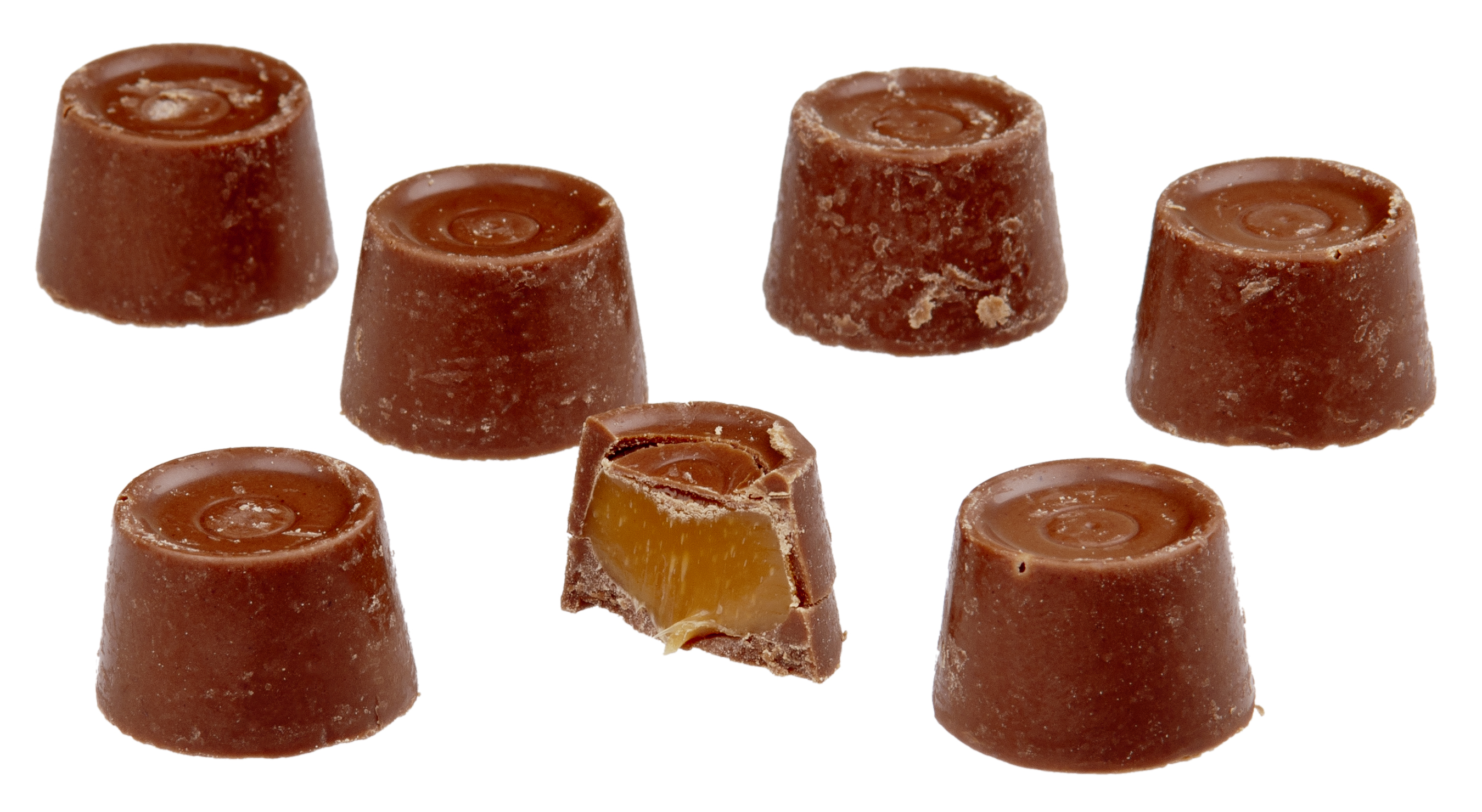
Rolos

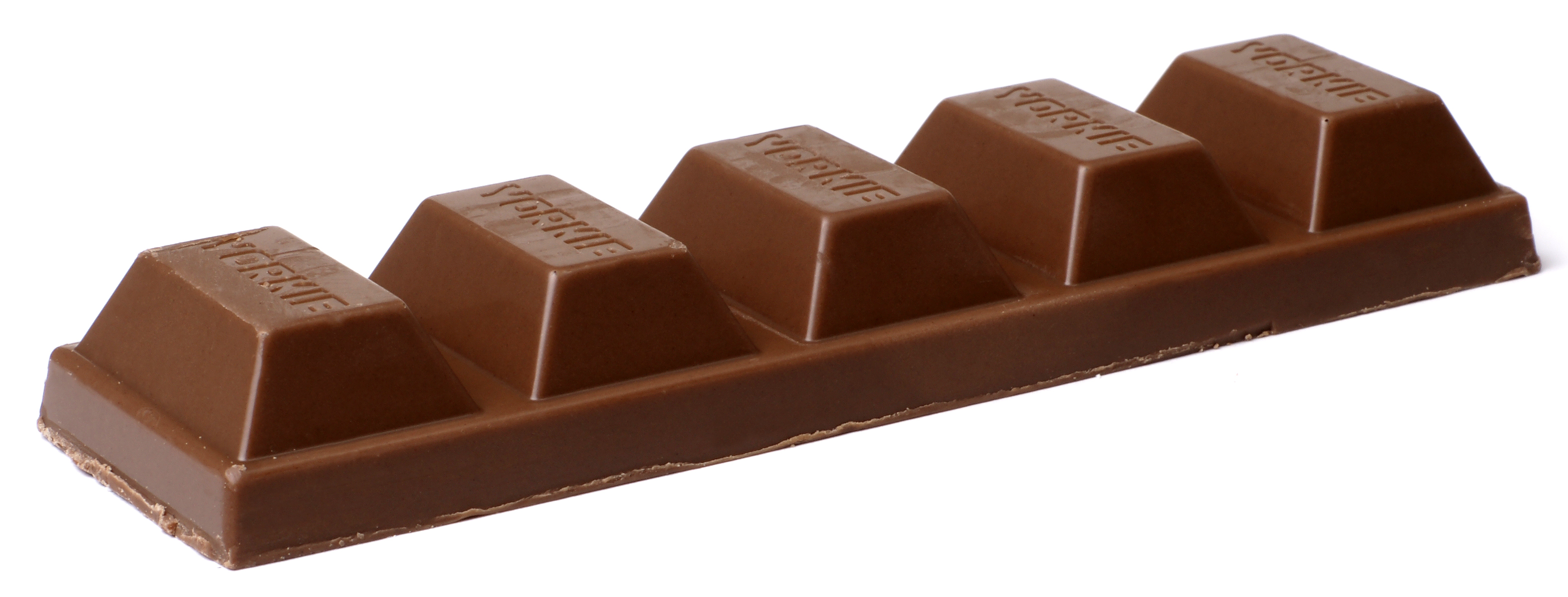
A Yorkie bar

- Necco Wafers
- Nerds
- Nestle
  - After Eight
  - Aero
  - Coffee Crisp
  - Crunch – several varieties, in addition to the original product, have been manufactured; in 1994, Crunch was their best-selling candy bar
  - Bottle Caps
  - Goobers
  - Fun Dip
  - Kit Kat
  - Matchmakers
  - Munchies
    - Mintola
  - Pixy Stix
  - Polos
  - Rolo
  - Runts
  - Smarties
  - Quality Street
  - Yorkie
- Nik-L-Nip
- Neapolitans
- Now and Later

== O ==
- Orion

== P ==
- Page & Shaw
- Panda
- Pantteri
- Paynes Poppets
- Peach Rings
- Peeps
- Perfetti Van Melle
  - Airheads
  - Chupa Chups
  - Fruittella
  - Klene
  - Mentos
- Pez
- Pixy Stix
- Pop Rocks

== R ==
- Rain-Blo
- Raisinets
- Redskins
- Reese's Whipps
- Riesen
- Ring Pop
- Rock (US)
- Rock (UK)
- Rot Front
- Roshen
- Rowntree's
  - Cabana – a "short-lived chocolate bar" produced in the 1980s by Rowntree's
  - Fruit gums
  - Fruit pastilles
  - Randoms

== S ==
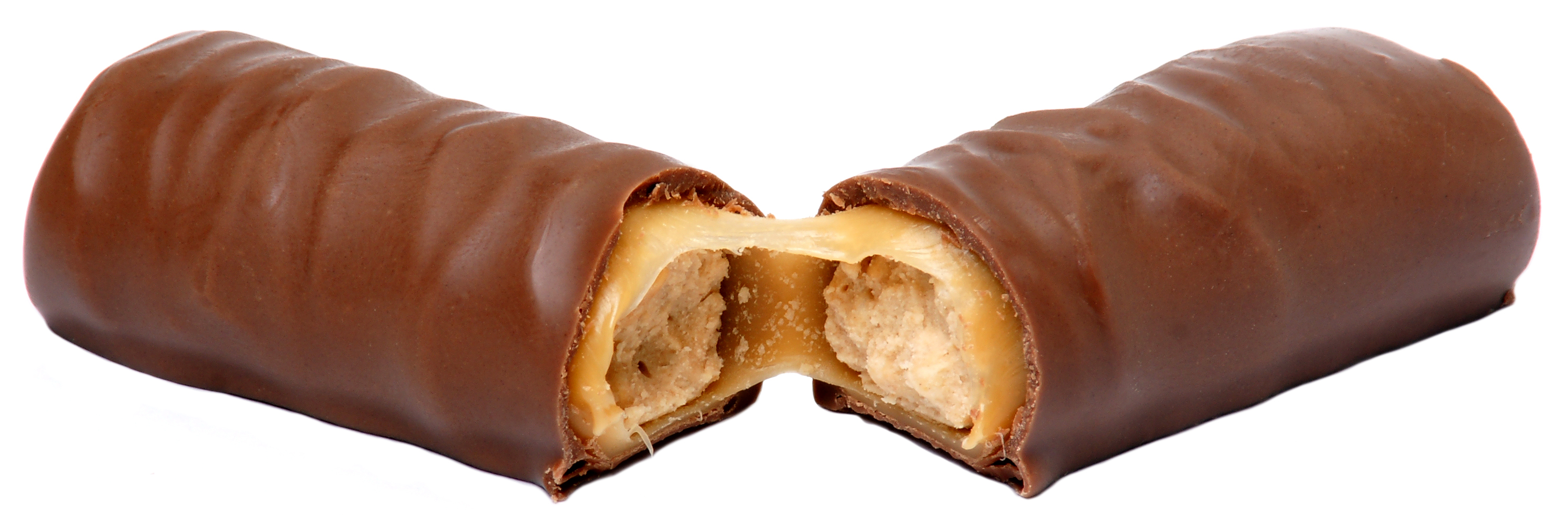
A Starbar split in half

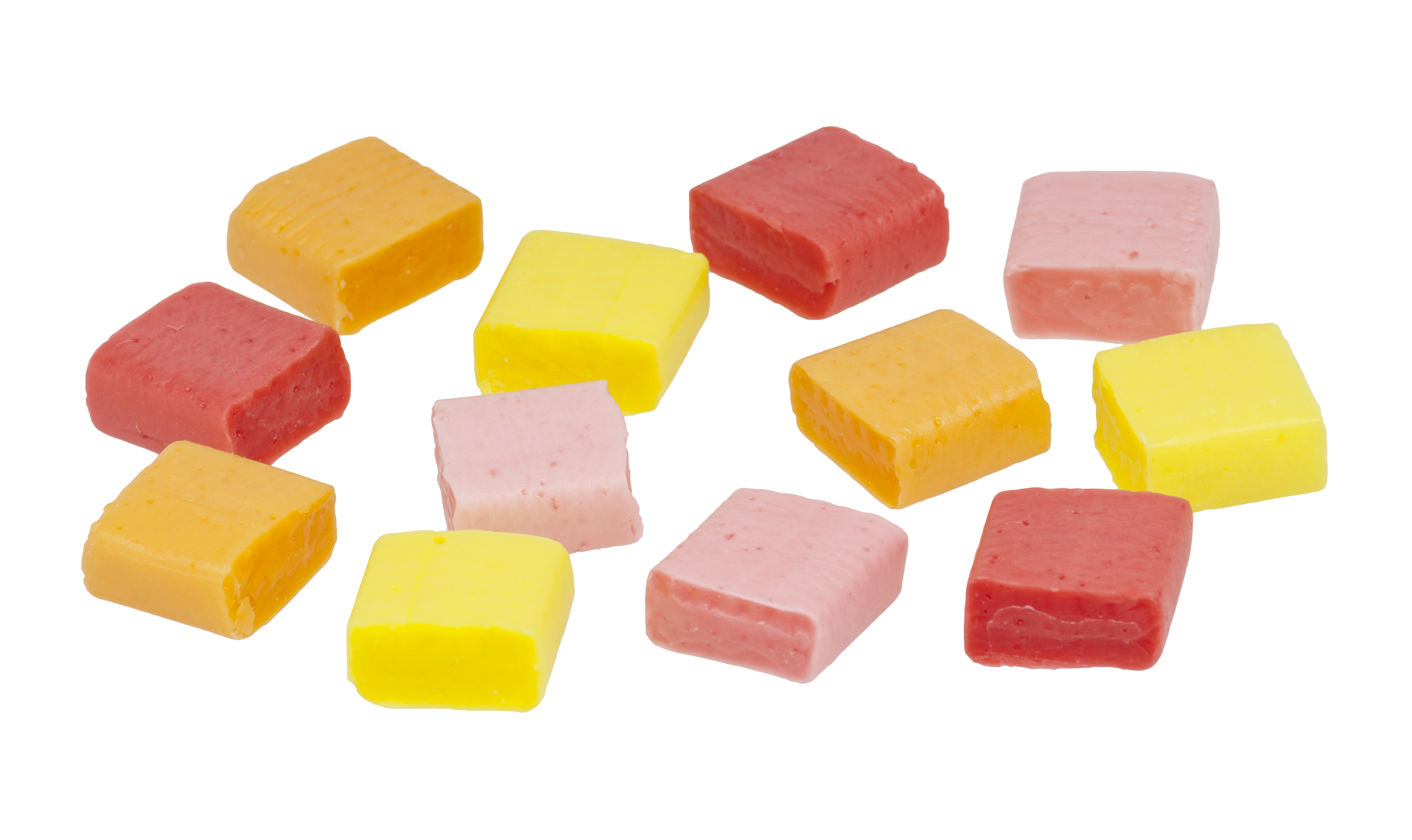
American Starburst candies

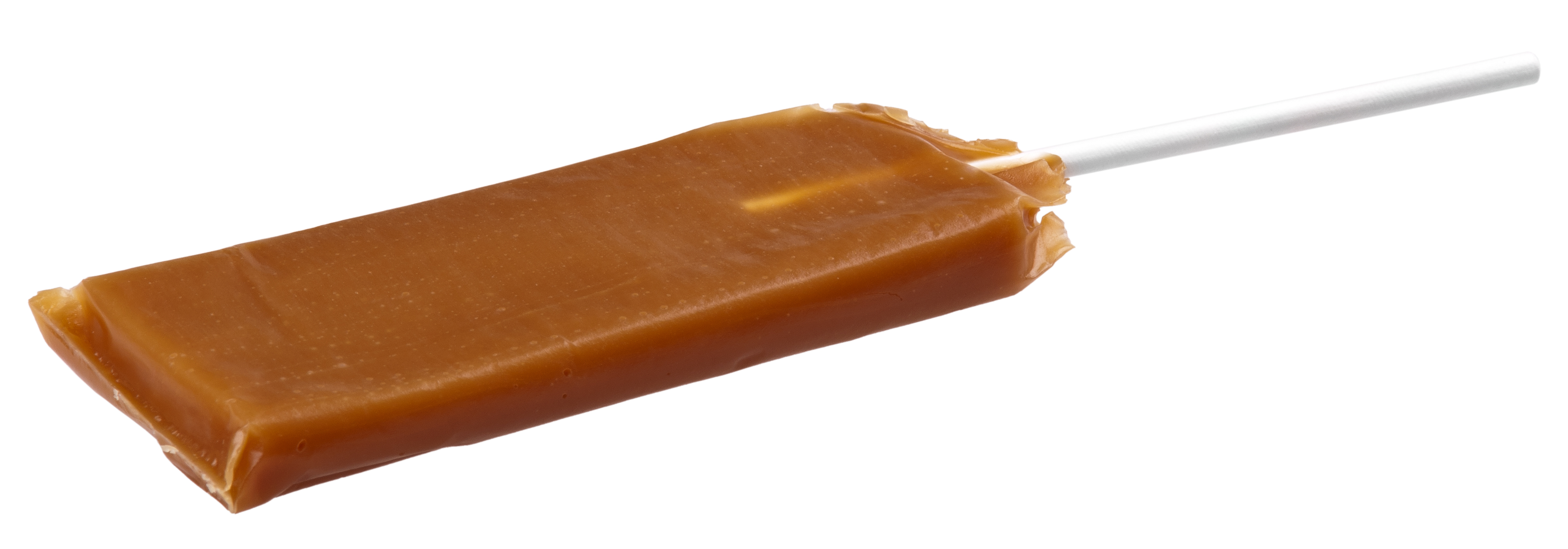
An unwrapped Sugar Daddy

- Sixlets
- Snickers
  - Pop Rocks
- Spangles
- Spira
- Sports Mixture
- Starbar
- Starburst
- Sugar Daddy
- Sugus
- Super Bubble
- Swedish berries
- Swedish Fish
- Sweethearts
- Swizzels Matlow
  - Double dip
  - Drumstick
  - Love Hearts
  - Parma Violets
  - Rainbow Drops
  - Refreshers

== T ==
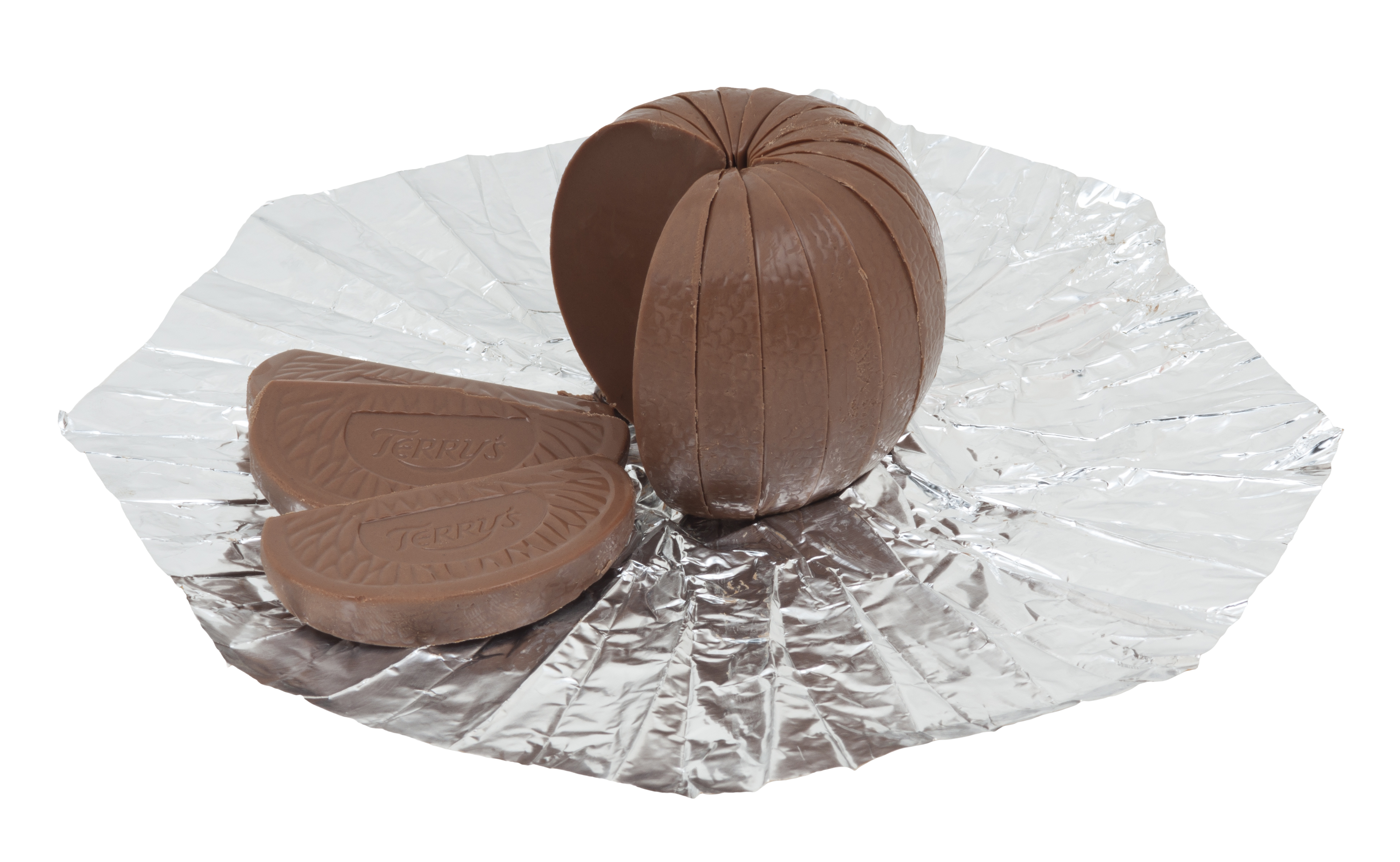
Terry's Chocolate Orange

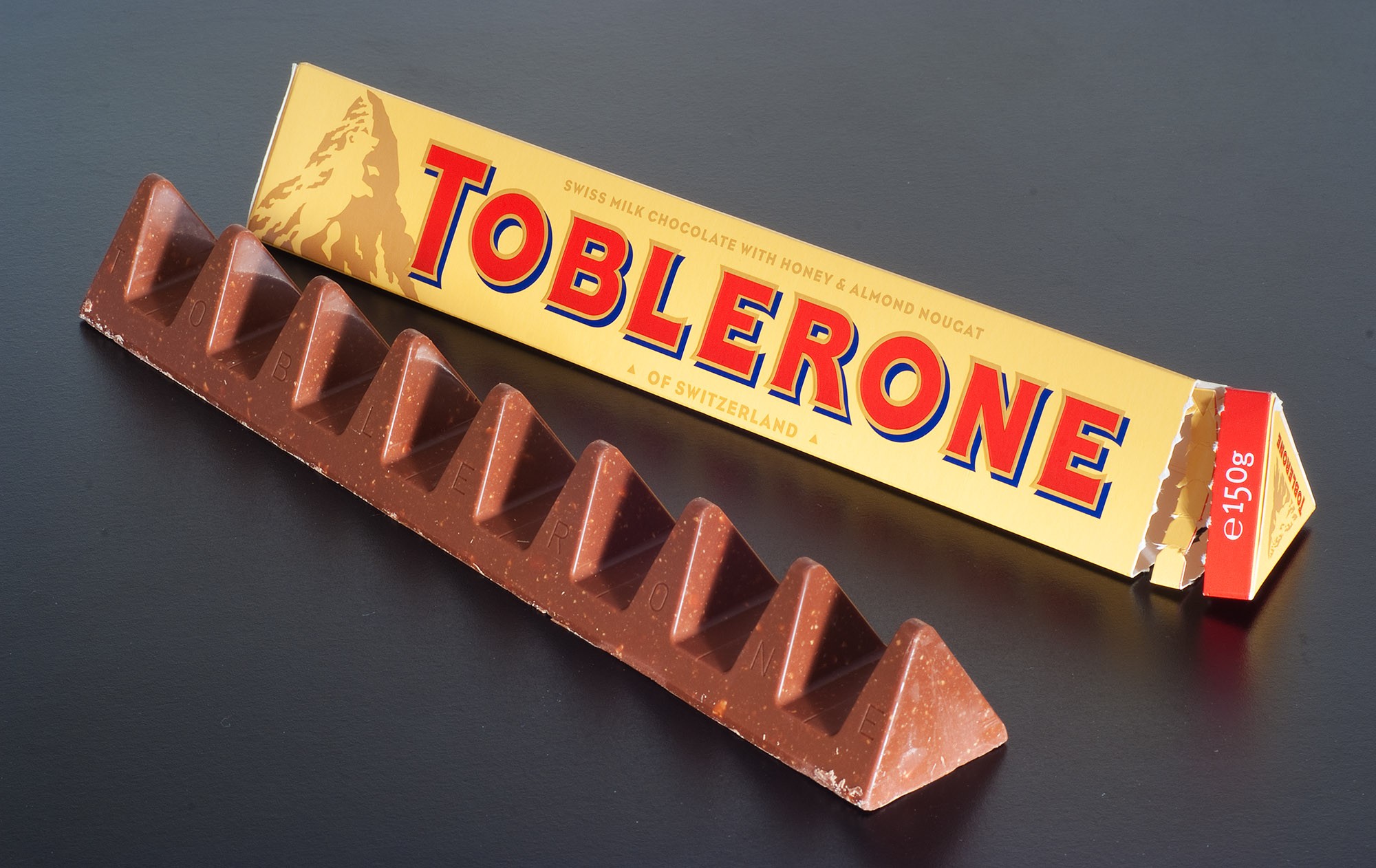
Toblerone

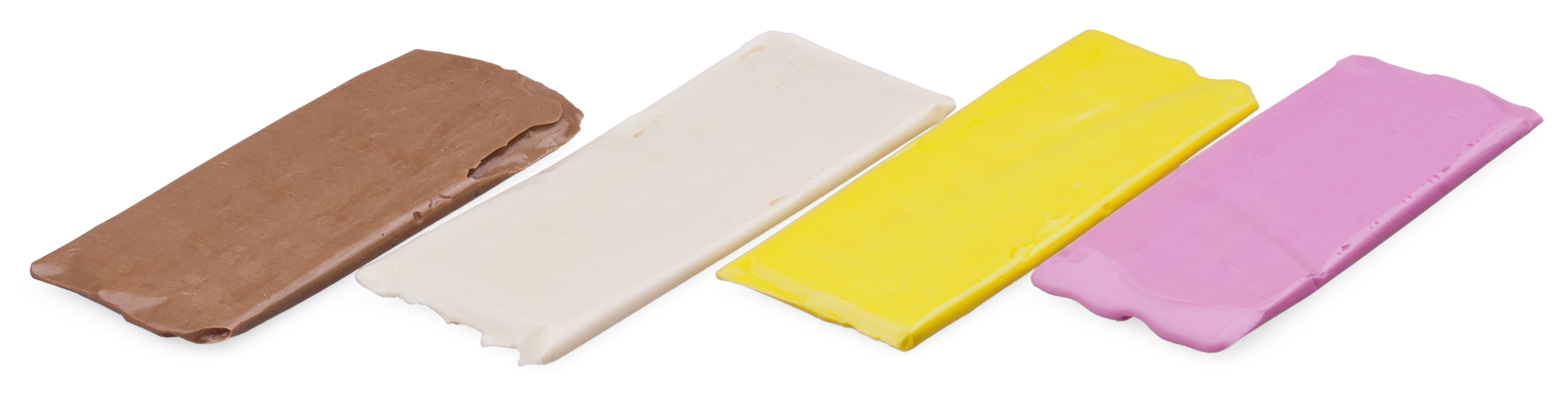
Unwrapped Turkish Taffy

- Tangerine Confectionery
  - Mojo
  - Highland Toffee
  - Wham Bar
- Tart 'n' Tinys
- Terry's
  - Terry's Chocolate Orange
- Texan
- Thorntons
- Toblerone
- Toffifee
- Tony's Chocolonely
- Tootsie Roll Industries
  - Andes Chocolate Mints
  - Caramel Apple Pops
  - Cella's
  - Charleston Chew
  - Charms Blow Pops
  - Crows
  - Cry Baby
  - Dots
  - Dubble Bubble
  - Fluffy Stuff
  - Frooties
  - Junior Mints
  - Razzles
  - Tootsie Pop
  - Tootsie Roll
- Topic
- Toxic Waste
- Trebor
  - Extra Strong Mints
- Treets
- Trio
- Trolli
- Tunes
- Turkish Taffy
- Twinkie
- Twizzlers

== U ==
- Ummah Foods
- Uncle Joe's Mint Balls
- Ülker

== V ==
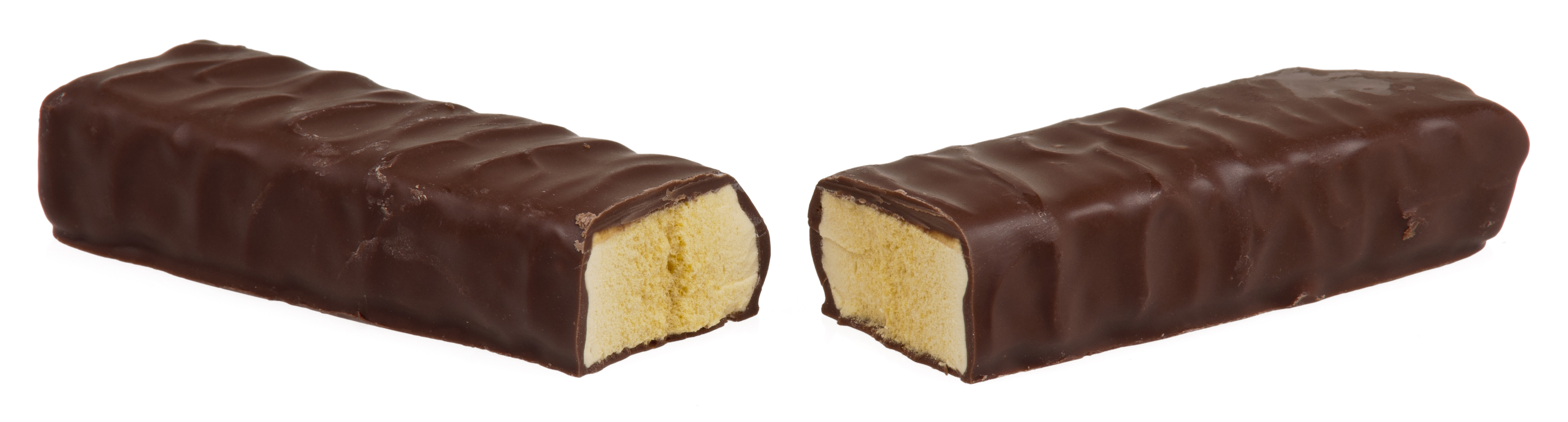
A split Violet Crumble

- Victory V (lozenge)
- Vidal
- Vimto
- Violet Crumble

== W ==
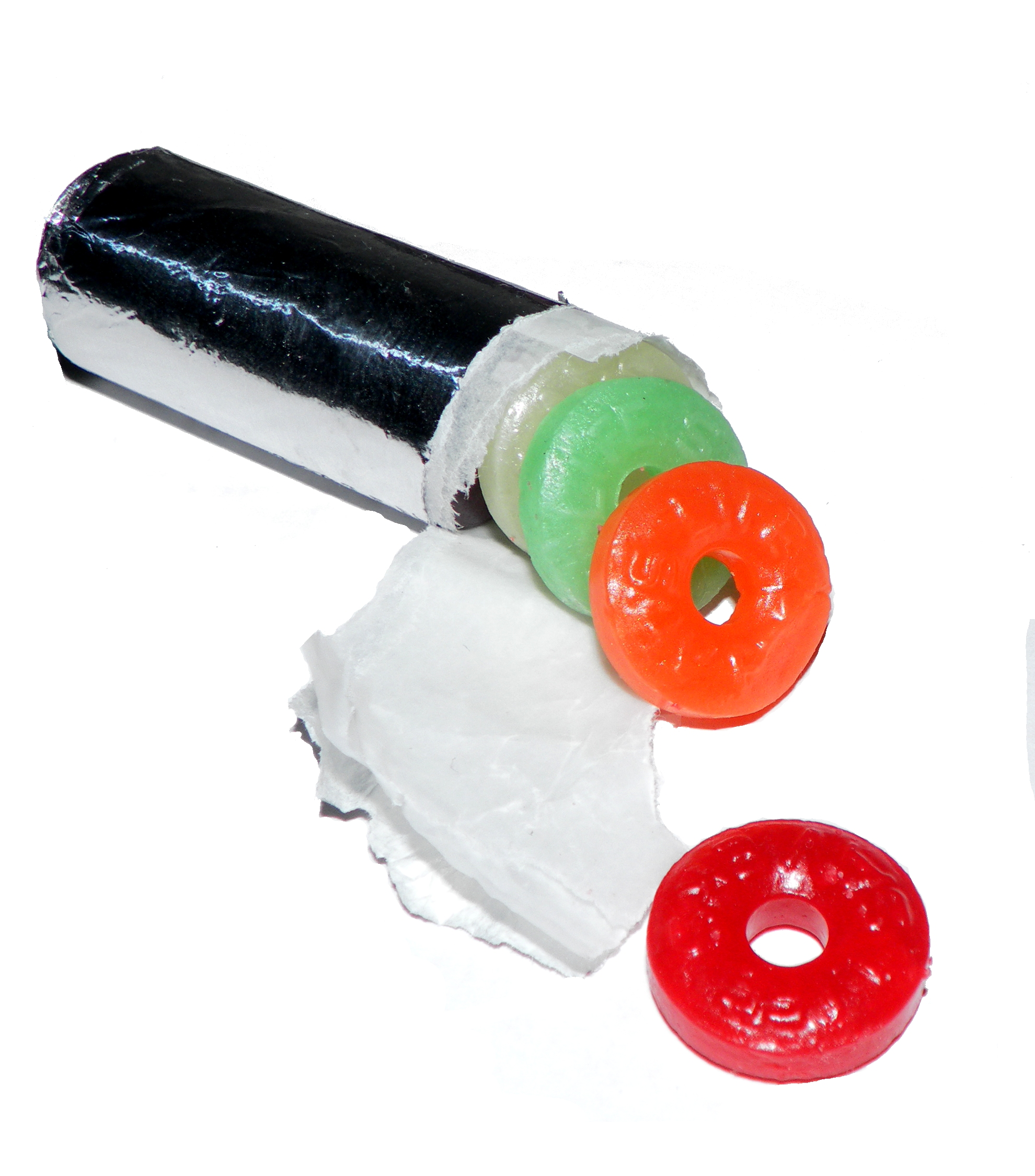
Life Savers

- Whittakers
- Wacky Wafers
- Walkers' Nonsuch – one of the oldest toffee makers in England
- Walnut whip
- Wawel Royal
- E. Wedel
  - Ptasie mleczko
- Wax lips
- Whistle Pops
- Whitworths
- Wizz Fizz
- Wonder Ball
- Warheads

== Z ==
- Zotz
- Zours

== See also ==
- List of bean-to-bar chocolate manufacturers
- List of breath mints
- List of candies
- List of chewing gum brands
- List of chocolate bar brands
