= Maynards Bassetts =

British confectionery brand

- Product type: Confectionery
- Current owner: Mondelez International
- Country: United Kingdom
- Introduced: 2016

Maynards Bassetts is a UK brand of confectionery owned by Mondelez International, introduced in 2016. The brand was created to merge its existing Maynards and Bassett's brands, which the company came to own following its purchase of Cadbury in 2010.

== Products ==
- Maynards Wine Gums

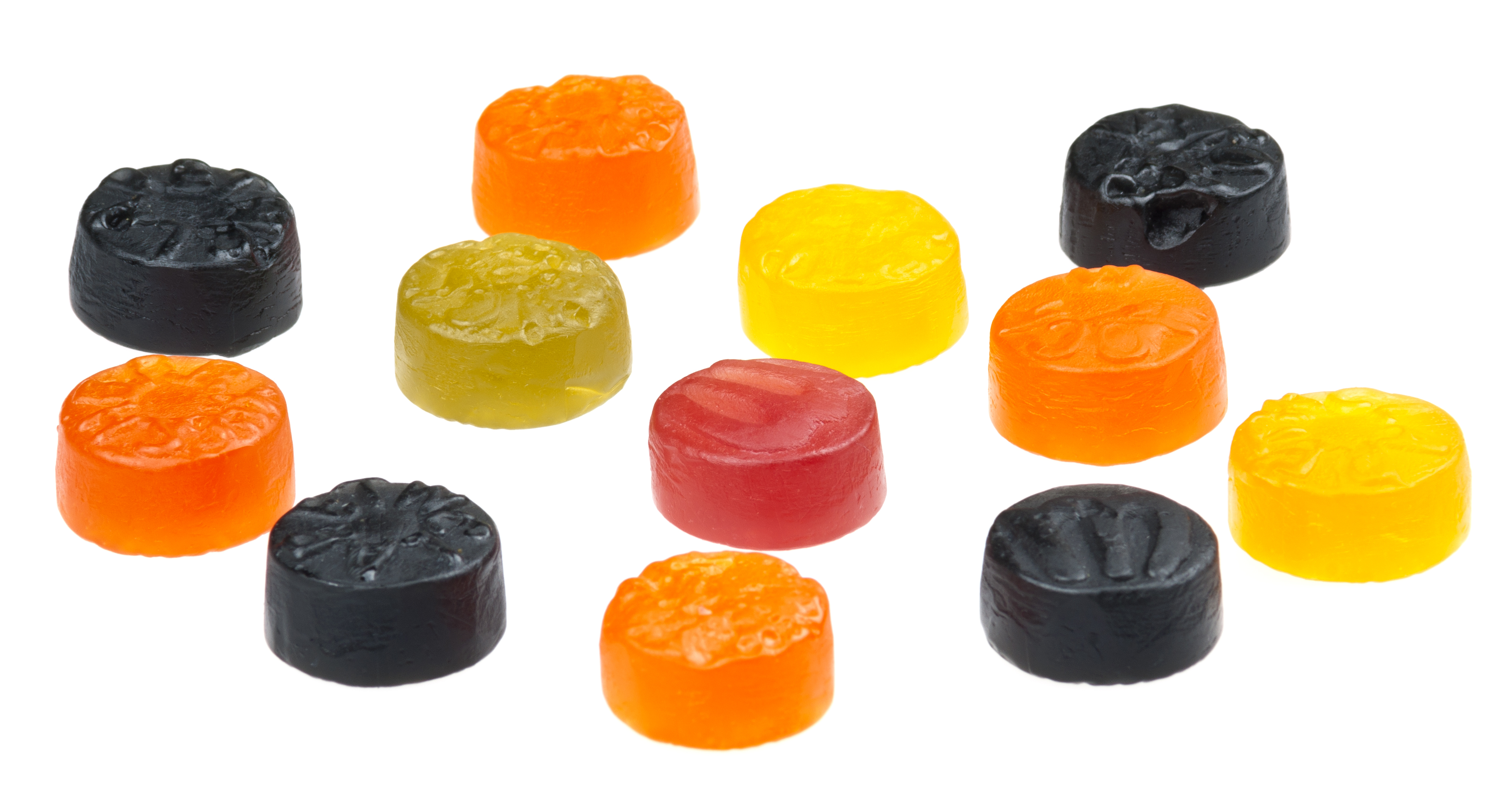
Maynards Wine Gums

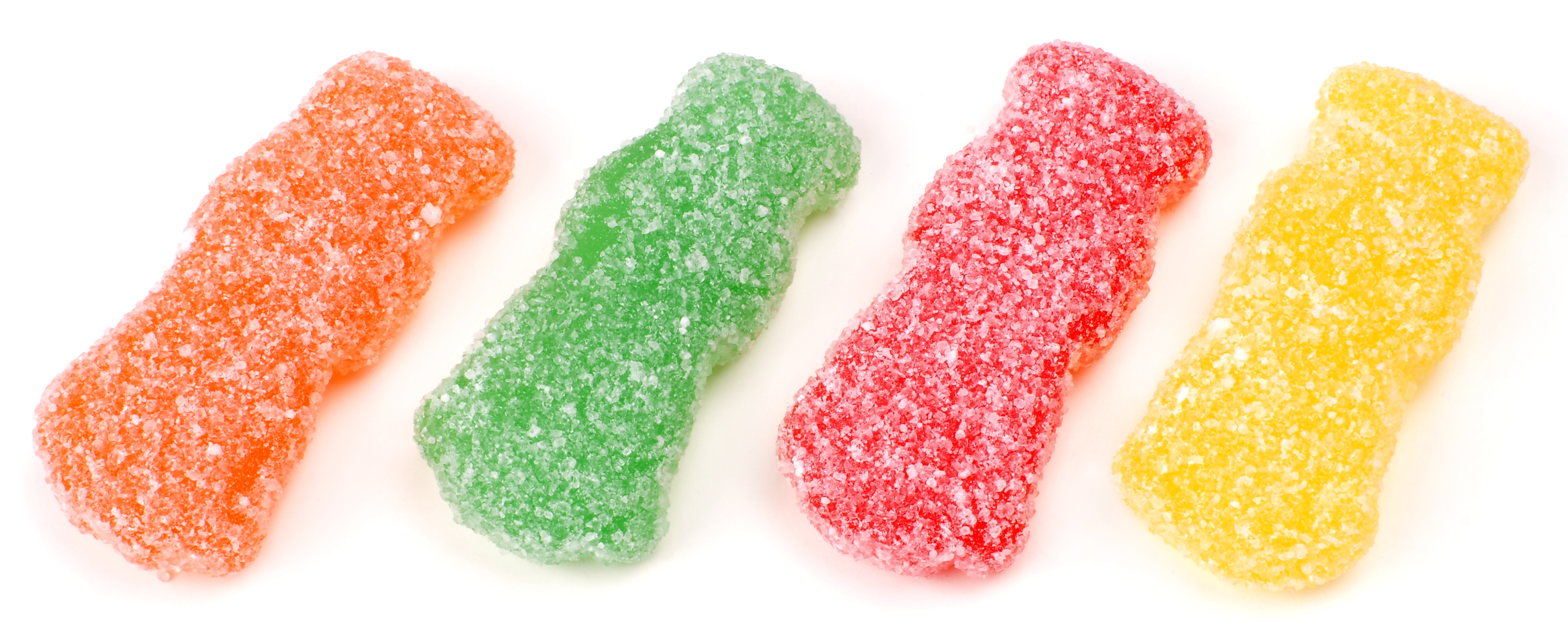
Maynards Sour Patch Kids

- Maynards Wine Pastilles
- Maynards Wine Sours
- Maynards Sports Mixture
- Maynards Mini Gems (renamed from Midget Gems in 2022).
- Maynards Wine Gums Light
- Maynards Swedish Berries
- Maynards Fuzzy Peaches
- Maynards Swedish Fish
- Maynards Sour Cherry Blasters
- Maynards Sour Watermelons
- Maynards Sour Patch Kids
- Maynards Ultra Sour Patch Kids
- Maynards Sour Patch Kids Soda Popz (UK only)
- Maynards Sour Chillers
- Maynards Juicy Squirts Berry
- Maynards Blush Berries
- Maynards Blackberry Bushels
- Maynards Orange Twists
- Maynards Sour Grapes
- Maynards Granny Smith

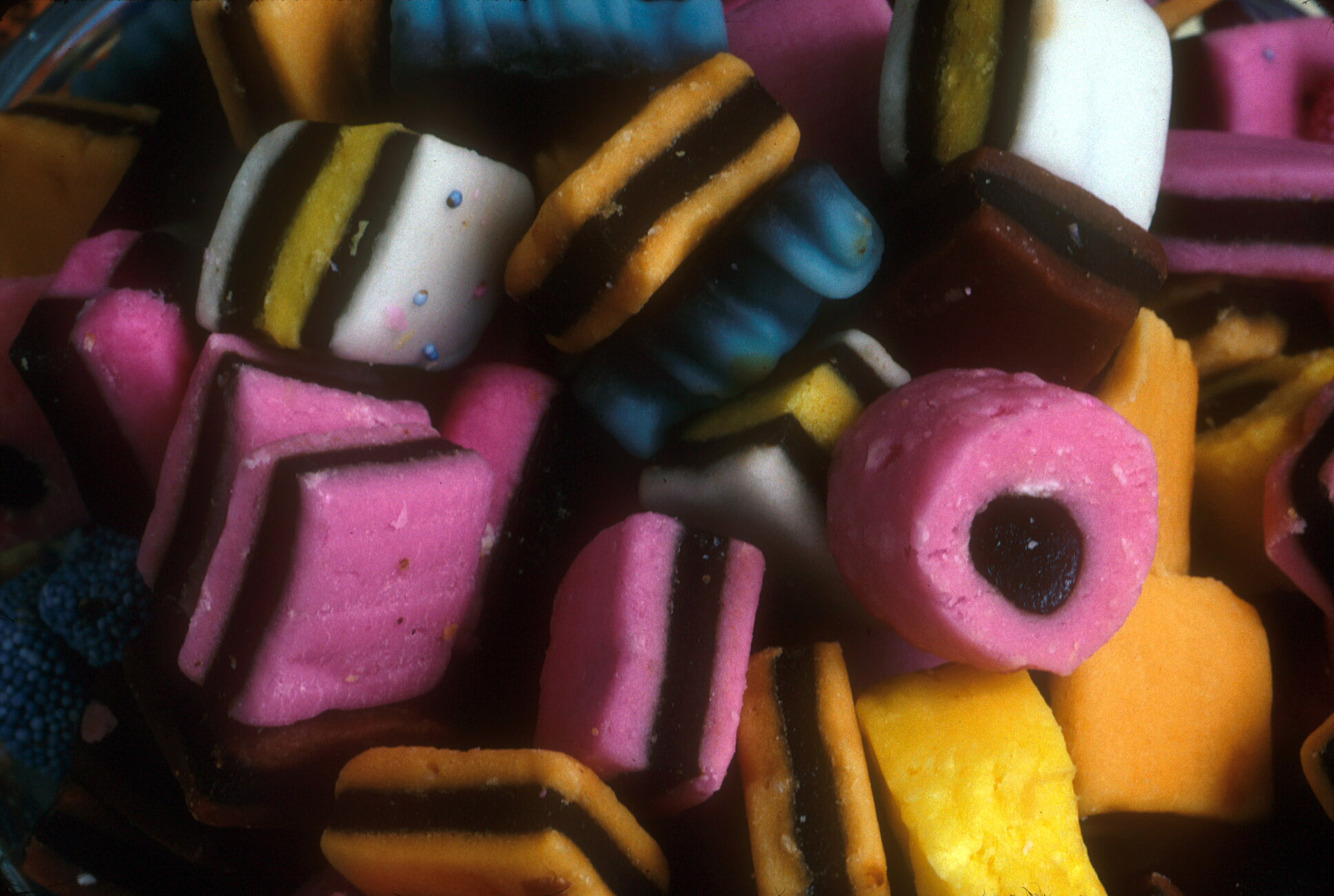
Liquorice allsorts

- Liquorice Allsorts
  - Fruit Allsorts
  - Dessert Allsorts
  - Sports Mixture
- Jelly Babies
  - Milky Babies
  - Fruity Babies
  - Party Babies
- Sherbet Lemons
- Fruit Bonbons
  - Lemon Bonbons
- Pear Drops
- Dolly mixture
- Sweetshop Favourites
- Murray Mints
- Mint Creams
- Mint Favourites
- Traditional Wine Gums (discontinued)
- Traditional Wine Gums (New recipe...)
- Imperials
  - Imperials Spearmint
- Everton Mints
- Animal Mix
- Snakes
- Sour Squirms
- and assorted toffees

== See also ==
- Barratt (confectionery)
- Swizzels
