= Toxic waste (disambiguation) =

Toxic waste is waste material that can cause death, injury or birth defects to living creatures.

Toxic waste may also refer to:

- Toxic Waste (candy), the sour confectionery
- Toxic Waste (band), the rock band
- Toxic Waste, a 2012 split EP by Toxic Holocaust and Municipal Waste
- A slang term for a toxic asset, such as collateralized debt obligations for subprime mortgages
