= Maynards =

British confectionery company

A pack of Maynards Wine Gums

Maynards was a British confectionery manufacturer best known for manufacturing wine gums. It was acquired by Cadbury in the 1990s, which in turn was acquired by Mondelez International (originally Kraft Foods) in 2010. In 2016, the brand was joined with Bassett's to create Maynards Bassetts.

Maynards is also manufactured in Canada.

== History ==
The grandfather of engineer Kenneth Maynard Wood (co-founder of kitchen appliance company Kenwood Ltd) Charles Riley Maynard and his brother Tom, started manufacturing sweets in their kitchen in 1880. Next door, Charles's wife, Sarah Ann, ran a sweet shop selling their products to the Stamford Hill area of Hackney, London.

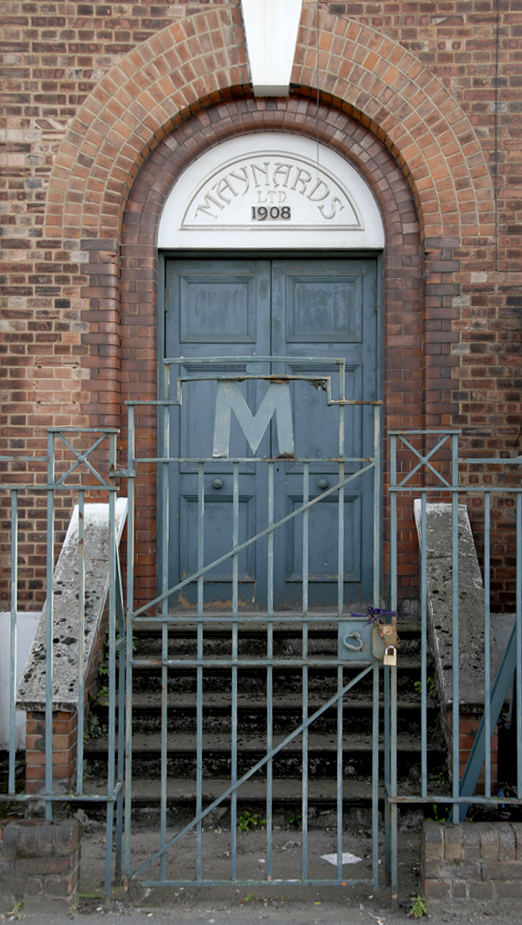
The Vale Road entrance of Maynards Harringay factory

In 1896 the brothers formed the Maynards sweet company. Ten years later, in 1906, the company set-up a new factory on Vale Road, Harringay. The new factory site, below an embankment of the New River, had clean Hertfordshire spring water to be used in production, whilst proximity of the Lee Navigation and numerous railways meant easy, cheap shipping of coal, sugar, and gelatin.

Around the turn of the century, Charles Gordon, heir to the confectionery firm, suggested to his father that the company should diversify into making "wine gums". Charles Riley, a strictly teetotal Methodist, gradually came round to the idea when his son persuaded him that the new sweets would not contain alcohol. Maynards Wine Gums were introduced in 1909.

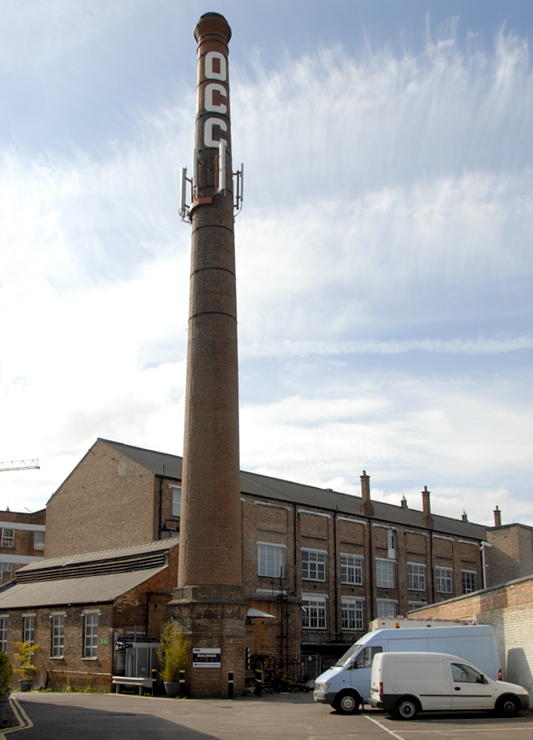
Maynards Harringay factory

The works grew to become a four-figure employer for the Harringay area. As Maynards grew, it expanded its manufacturing operations to other locations, such as a toffee factory in the Ouseburn area of Newcastle upon Tyne.

The 140 portfolio of sweet shops set-up as the company expanded were sold in 1985, and the company was acquired by Cadbury in 1988. The brand merged in 1990 with the Tottenham liquorice mill Bassett's, and Trebor. Sweet manufacture of the three brands moved to Sheffield in 1991. By 2002 worldwide sales of Maynards Wine Gums were forty million pounds sterling per year.

== Products ==
Some items are licensed by Unilever and/or Nestle, such as Sour Patch Kids bar, in selected countries

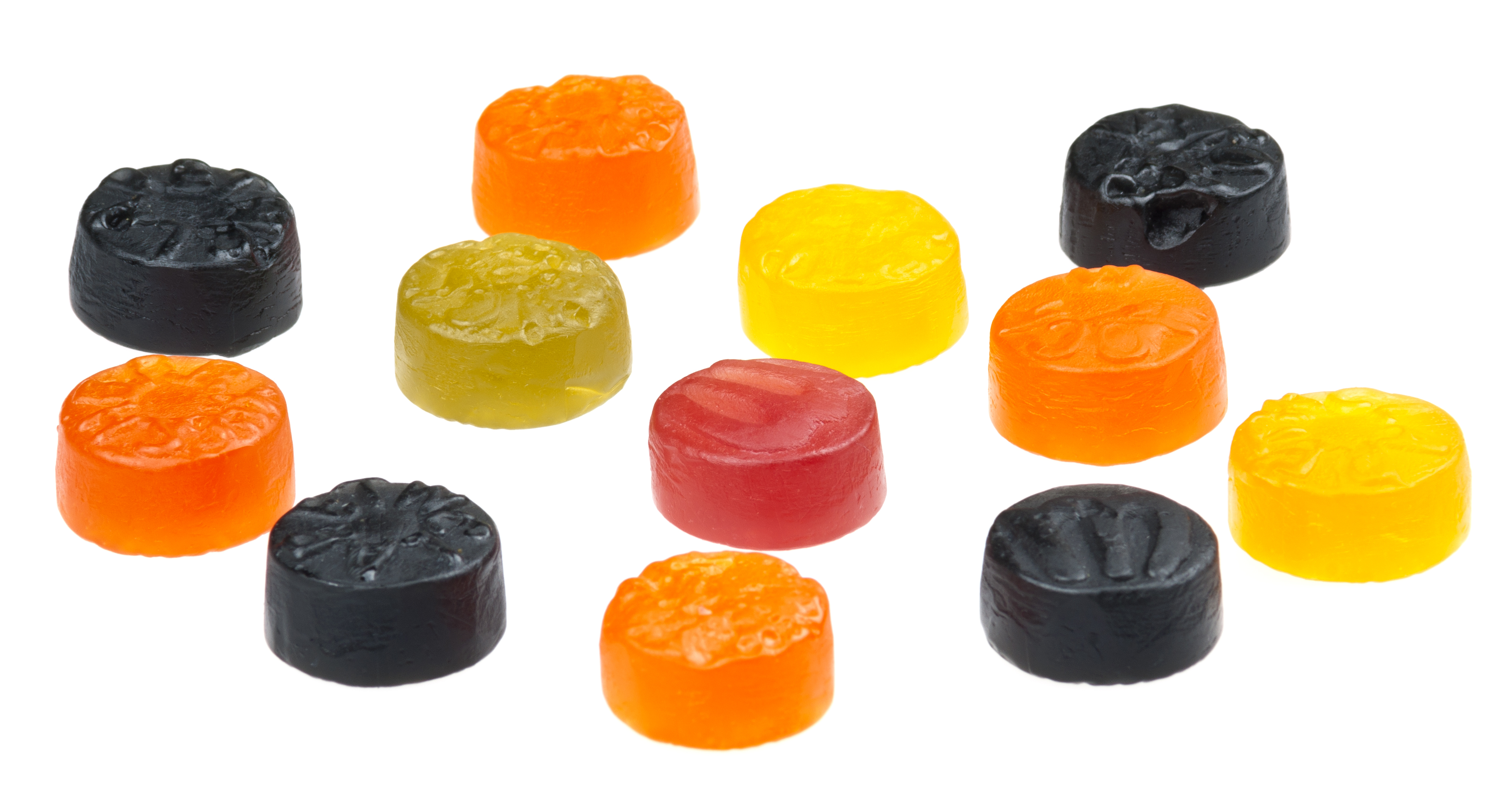
Maynards Wine Gums

- Maynards Wine Gums
- Maynard
- Maynards Wine Sours
- Maynards Sports Mixture
- Maynards Midget Gems
- Maynards Wine Gums Light
- Maynards Swedish Berries
- Maynards Fuzzy Peaches
- Maynards Swedish Fish
- Maynards Sour Cherry Blasters
- Maynards Sour Watermelons
- Maynards Sour Patch Kids
- Maynards Ultra Sour Patch Kids
- Maynards Sour Patch Kids Soda Popz (UK only)

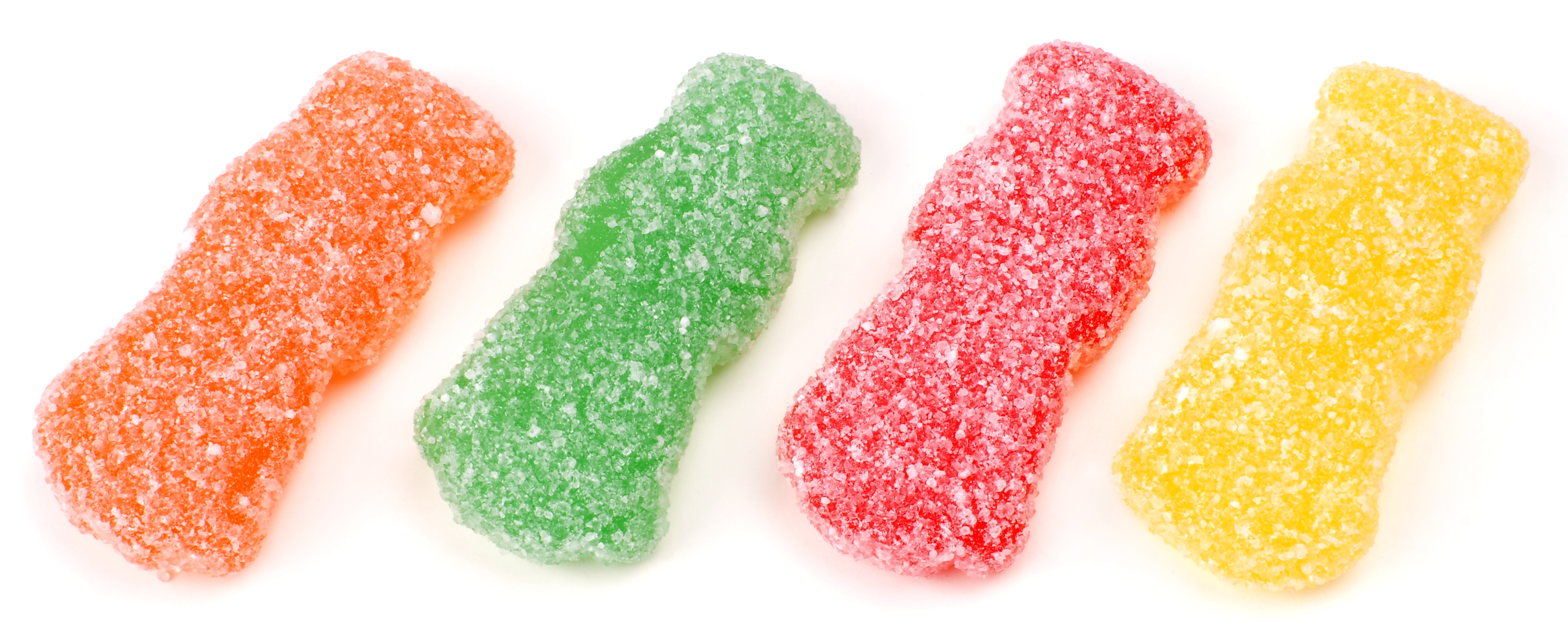
Maynards Sour Patch Kids

- Maynards Sour Chillers
- Maynards Juicy Squirts Berry
- Maynards Blush Berries
- Maynards Blackberry Bushels
- Maynards Orange Twists
- Maynards Sour Grapes
- Maynards Granny Smith
- Maynards Gummy Bears
- Maynards Fruit Mania

== See also ==
- Bassett's
- Trebor (confectionery)
- Barratt (confectionery)

== Sources ==
- Maynards Wine Gums. Random House. May 2001. ISBN 978-0-09-982444-2.
- Former Cadbury UK Maynards information page (archived)
