= Wawel (company) =

Polish confectionery company

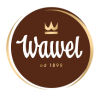
- Company type: Public
- Traded as: WSE: WWL sWIG80 component
- Industry: Confectionery
- Founded: 1951; 75 years ago
- Headquarters: Kraków; Dobczyce production, Poland
- Key people: Dariusz Orłowski (CEO)
- Products: chocolate products; bonbonnieres; wafers; cocoa; candy
- Number of employees: 869 (2015)
- Website: www.wawel.com.pl/en

Wawel is a Polish confectionery company, producing many varieties of chocolates, wafers, chocolate bars and snacks. Wawel is also a well-recognized brand of candy in Poland.

== History ==
It was founded in 1951. In 1992 the company was privatised and in 1998 entered the Warsaw Stock Exchange. In 2006 the three historic factories in Kraków were closed and production was moved to a new factory in Dobczyce. Since 2007 52.12% of its shares have been owned by the German company Hosta International.

== Products ==
The most popular products manufactured by Wawel include Danusia (chocolate bar), Malaga, Tiki Taki, Kasztanki (chocolates), Raczki, Kukułki, Fresh & Fruity (candies) and Mieszanka Krakowska (chocolate box).

== See also ==
- Economy of Poland
- E. Wedel
- List of confectionery brands
