= Ummah Foods =

British halal chocolate company

- Industry: Confectionery
- Founded: 2004
- Founder: Khalid Sharif
- Headquarters: Ilford, Essex, United Kingdom
- Area served: United Kingdom
- Key people: Khalid Sharif
- Number of employees: 4
- Website: Ummah Foods

Ummah Foods, established in 2004, is a United Kingdom manufacturer of halal chocolates, meaning that they are acceptable for consumption by Muslims under Islamic law. This means that no alcohols, or animal fats are used in the ingredients, manufacturing process, or packaging.

The company was founded by Khalid Sharif. Ummah originally produced two chocolate bars, in caramel and orange flavors. It has since expanded to five flavors. Ummah chocolate is carried by select Asda and Tesco locations.

Ummah brands itself as a community-focused company. To that end, it pledges to donate ten percent of profits to charity and use sustainable manufacturing processes. The company hires Muslim artists to design its wrappers and branding.

Ummah has been praised for successfully marketing to Muslims and non-Muslims alike as a niche product. It has also attracted criticism for using religion as a branding tool.

== See also ==
- List of confectionery brands
