= Spira (confectionery) =

Former chocolate product produced by Cadbury

Spira was a milk chocolate product in the form of a hollow twisted spiral produced by Cadbury. There were two spiral fingers in each pack, and the brand was initially only available in the south-west and north-west of England in the mid-1980s, before being rolled out across the country.

The development of Spira can be traced back to 1984 and was born of two key factors: a new production process allowed chocolate to be produced in different shapes and textures without the need for moulds, and the company perceived a weakness in its product mix with too few ‘countline’ products and limited appeal to teenagers.

Of three potential products taken forward from the concept stage, a twisted bar with cartwheel cross-section named ‘Rollers’ was deemed the most successful. Further refinement, changes to presentation and the change of name eventually resulted in the emergence of the Spira product, which was aimed squarely at the 15 to 24-year-old market.

Following a million-pound investment in plant at the Bournville factory, Cadbury first test-launched Spira in the Granada television region. The chocolate was successful enough to gain a 6.3% market share and the number two chocolate position, but it proved impossible to produce sufficient quantities to keep up with demand at this stage. The bar was withdrawn from market and a new test market was established in the south-west while additional factory capacity was built.

In 1989, the bar was launched nationwide. It continued to be available until June 2005.

== See also ==
- List of confectionery brands
