= Midget Gems =

English sweets

Midget Gems Mini Gems
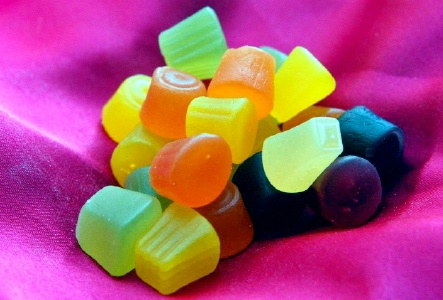
- An assortment of Midget Gems.
- Alternative names: Mini Gems
- Type: Confectionery
- Place of origin: United Kingdom
- Main ingredients: Gelatine, sugar, citric acid, fruit flavouring

Midget Gems (also known as Mini Gems) are chewy, firm sweets similar to wine gums but much harder. They are manufactured from sugar and glucose syrup, corn starch and/or various other starches, animal gelatin, and various colourings and flavouring.

Midget Gems were extremely popular in the North of England and were one of the Lion Confectionery Company's biggest-selling brands. In 1995 the company joined forces with Cadbury Trebor Bassett brand Maynard's to market the sweet across the country. At the time the sweet was re-branded under the Maynard's banner, the black Midget Gems were changed from liquorice flavour to blackcurrant, but only in the bagged product – those sold loose, from jars and boxes, remain liquorice. Some of the newer bagged product now have reintroduced the liquorice flavour.

A leading selling point for Midget Gems is that they were often sold loose from a jar or barrel. This made them inexpensive and helped bolster their popularity.

Midget Gems are produced by a wide variety of other companies. Glisten Confectionery manufacture them under their Victoria brand, and in 2007 announced that they were removing all artificial colours and flavourings from the sweets. Many supermarkets and stores such as Asda, Tesco, Marks and Spencer, and Sainsbury's manufacture their own versions.

The sweet is so popular that Liverpool Football Club at one point sold their own branded tubs of Midget Gems, and the sweet frequently appears in lists of "Favourite sweets".

Midget Gems are now sold in wide variety of colours and flavours, adding to the choices consumers have when purchasing them.

In January 2022, Marks & Spencer announced their plan to change the name of their sweet to "mini gems", after a campaign by Liverpool Hope University academic Dr. Erin Pritchard, who has dwarfism and regards the word "midget" as offensive to people with her condition. The reaction on social media was mixed. Tesco and Maynards Bassetts followed suit later that year.

== See also ==
- Dots
- Grether's Pastilles
- Gumdrop
- Gummies
- Jelly baby
- Jelly bean
- Jujube
- Jujyfruits
- Rowntree's Fruit Pastilles
- Swedish Fish
- Wine gum
