= Bassett's =

Former British confectionery company and former brand

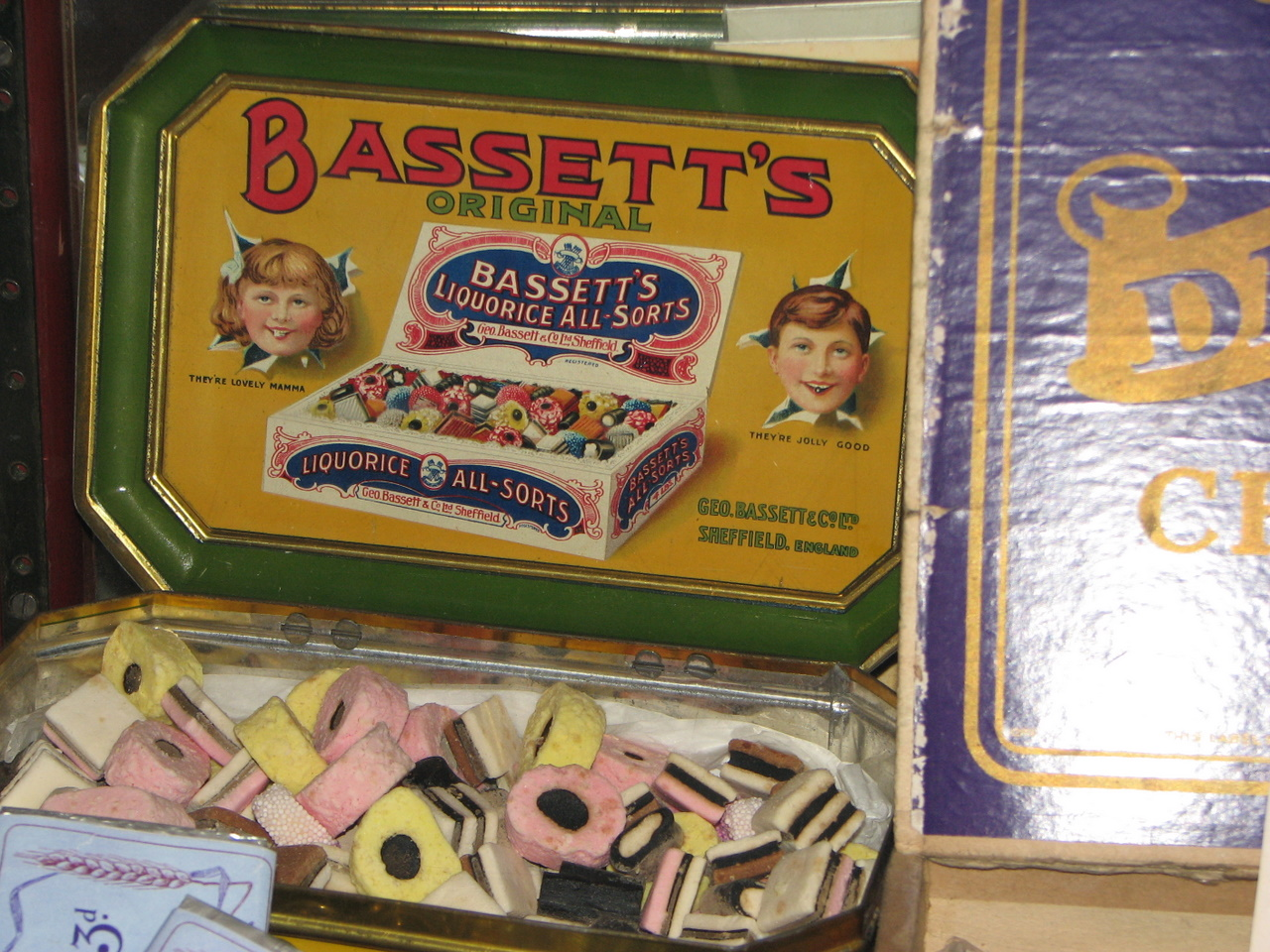
An old Liquorice Allsorts tin in Beamish Museum

George Bassett & Co., known simply as Bassett's, was an English confectionery company and brand. The company was founded in Sheffield by George Bassett in 1842. The company became a brand of Cadbury Schweppes in 1989. The brand's final owner was Mondelēz International, which merged the brand with Maynards to create Maynards Bassetts in 2016.

The company's best-known sweets, the Liquorice Allsorts, were supposedly created by accident in 1899, and in 1926 the Bertie Bassett mascot was created; Bertie continues to represent the product today. Jelly Babies were produced by the brand since 1918.

== History ==
The Sheffield Directory of 1842 records George Bassett as being "wholesale confectioner, lozenge maker and British wine trader". In 1851, Bassett took on an apprentice called Samuel Meggitt Johnson, who later became Bassett's son-in-law. His descendants ran the company until Gordon Johnson retired as chairman in the 1970s. Bassett's was first listed on the London Stock Exchange in 1929. They opened up a factory in Broad Street, Sheffield in 1852. The site moved in 1933 to Owlerton in another district of the city and remains there today. Unclaimed Babies were being produced during the 19th century, especially in the North West of England. In 1918, Bassetts launched their own range of the soft sweets which they called Peace Babies. They were re-launched as Jelly Babies in the 1950s and were allegedly thrown at the Beatles during concerts as they were a favourite of George Harrison.

The Liquorice Allsorts variety was created by accident when Bassett salesman Charlie Thompson dropped the samples of several different products in front of a prospective client. The client was taken by the idea of selling the sweets all mixed up and in return for the success, the company allowed the client to name the new brand.

Barratt & Co. Ltd. was acquired in a friendly takeover by Bassett's in 1966. In 1989, the combined firms were acquired by the then-united Cadbury-Schweppes company in a deal brokered for £91 million. In 2016, all the products were re-marketed under the Maynards Bassett dual branding.

== Products ==
Confectionery items that use the Bassett's name today include:

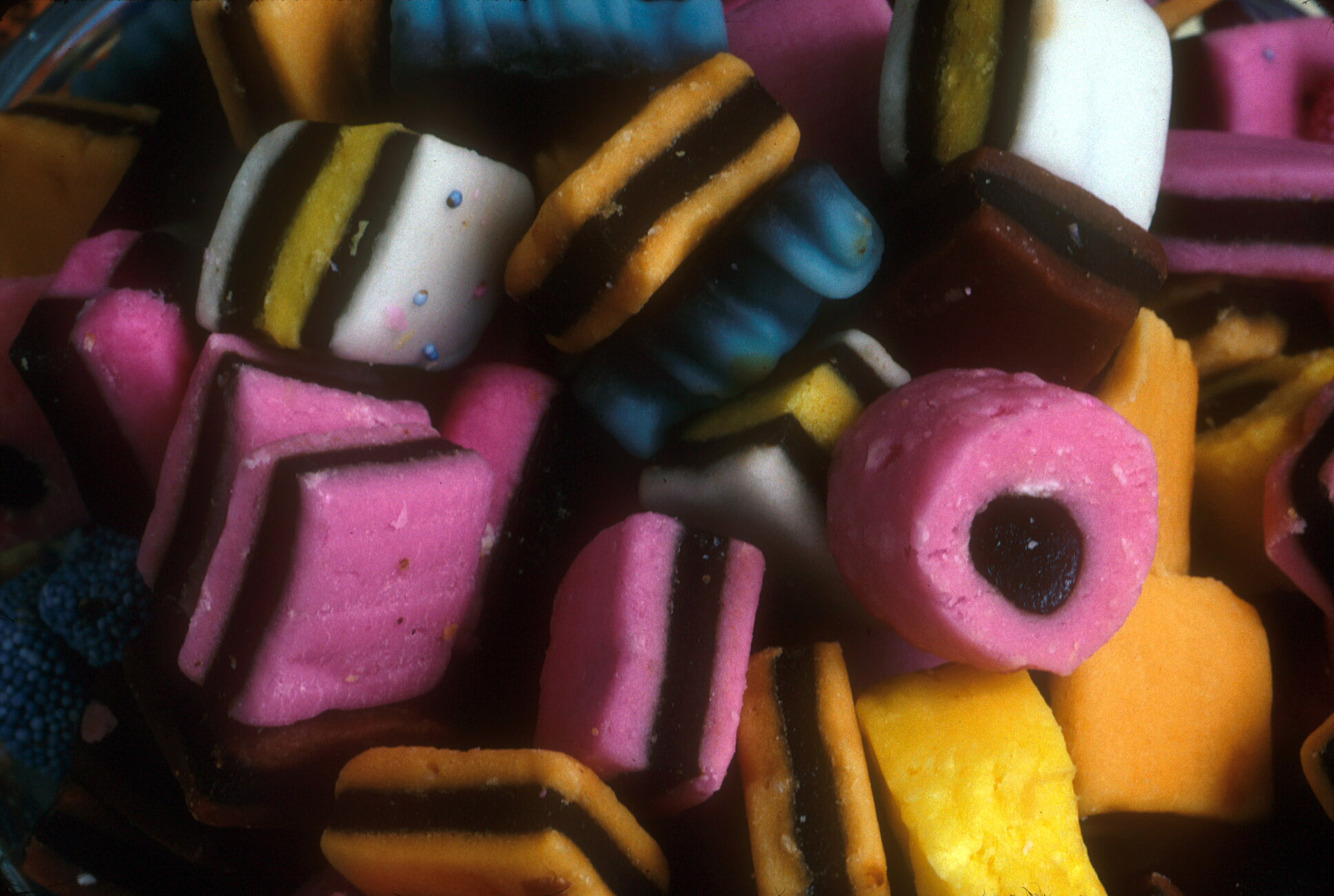
Liquorice allsorts

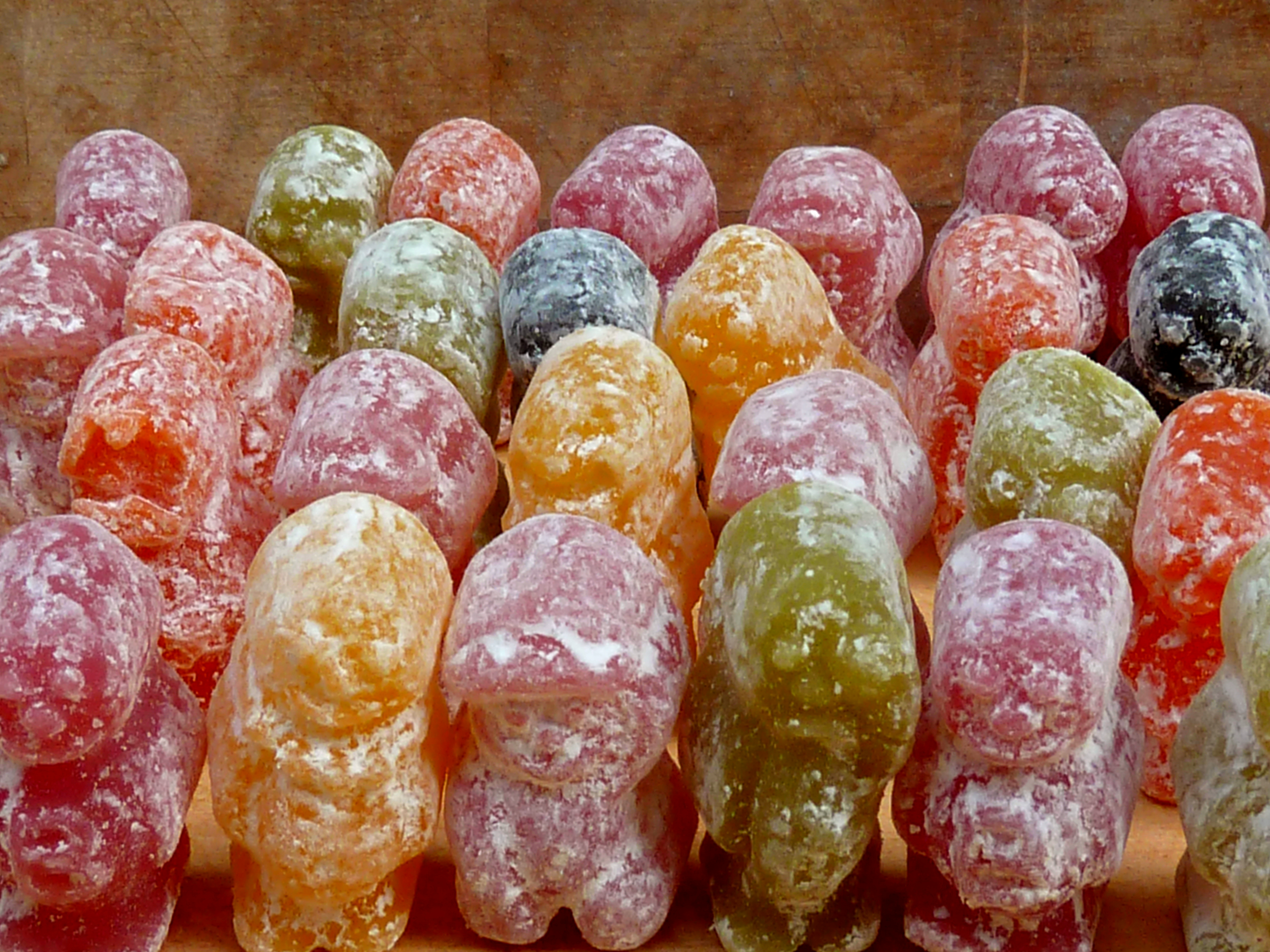
Jelly Babies

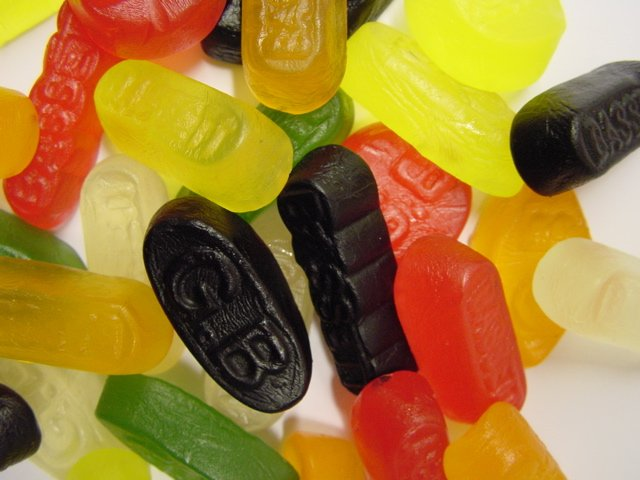
Bassett's winegums

- Liquorice Allsorts
  - Fruit Allsorts
  - Dessert Allsorts
  - Sports Mixture
- Jelly Babies
  - Milky Babies
  - Fruity Babies
  - Party Babies
- Sherbet Lemons
- Fruit Bonbons
  - Lemon Bonbons
- Pear Drops
- Dolly mixture
- Sweetshop Favourites
- Murray Mints
- Mint Creams
- Mint Favourites
- Traditional Wine Gums (discontinued)
- Traditional Wine Gums (New recipe...)
- Imperials
  - Imperials Spearmint
- Everton Mints
- Animal Mix
- Snakes
- Sour Squirms
- and assorted toffees

== See also ==
- Maynards
- Trebor (confectionery)
- Barratt (confectionery)
