= Bamsemums =

Bear shaped chocolate-covered marshmallow candy from Norway

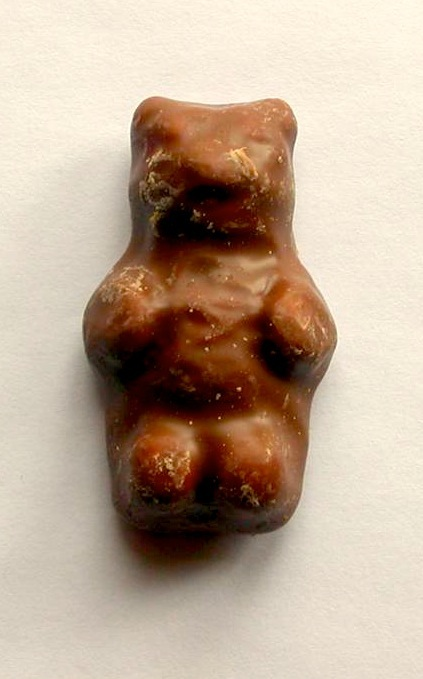
- Type: Confectionery
- Place of origin: France
- Created by: Bouquet d'Or
- Main ingredients: Marshmallow, chocolate

Bamsemums is a bear shaped chocolate-covered marshmallow candy created by the chocolate factory Bouquet d'Or, in Ascq, France.

== History ==
The first bear shaped chocolate-covered marshmallow candy was invented and manufactured in 1962 by the chocolate factory Bouquet d'Or, in Ascq (now Villeneuve-d'Ascq), France under the name 'Petit ourson'.

Some confectionaries have started to make their own bear shaped chocolate-covered marshmallow candy as the Bouquet d'Or's one, as Nidar in 1975.

The Villeneuve-d'Ascq chocolate factory was bought by the Cémoi Group in 2003. Since then, annual production of gummy bears has tripled, reaching 3,000 tonnes in 2012.

To celebrate the 40th anniversary of these little bears, an exclusive collector's box has been created, specially designed for the Colette boutique in Paris.

== Types of Bamsemums ==
- Bamsemums original (1975)
- Bamsemums jelly (1992)
- Bamsemums foam (1992)
- Bamsemums banana (2004)
- Bamsemums raspberry (2005)
- Bamsemums citrus (2014)
