= Toxic Waste (candy) =

Sour confectionery owned and marketed by American company Candy Dynamics Inc

Toxic Waste product line

Close-up of Toxic Waste drum packaging

Toxic Waste is a line of sour confectionery owned and marketed by American company Candy Dynamics Inc., which is headquartered in Indianapolis, Indiana. The products are sold primarily in the United States and Canada as well as several international markets such as the United Kingdom, Ireland and South Africa. The original hard candies are sold in novelty containers resembling hazardous-waste drums.

== Production and distribution ==
Some Toxic Waste products have a hard, sour exterior and a sweet interior filled with similarly sour liquid. Toxic Waste candy products are made in Brazil, Pakistan and Spain. Toxic Waste candy is distributed in the United States and Canada. In 2009, the products were distributed in the United Kingdom by Newbridge Foods, based in Bromborough, Wirral.

There are five original flavors: apple, black cherry, watermelon, lemon and blue raspberry. A purple container was also introduced, containing the flavors blueberry, blackberry, black cherry and grape. In addition to the purple drum, five new flavors were introduced in the red drum variety: raspberry, cranberry, red pear, strawberry and red grape, and a further five flavors - lime, kiwi, melon, green apple and green pear - were introduced in the green drum. The brand also includes Smog Balls, Goop (discontinued in the USA), Slime Lickers, Hi Voltage Bubblegum (discontinued in the USA), Short Circuits Bubblegum (discontinued in the USA), Toxic Waste Gum Balls (discontinued in the USA), and Mutant Gummy Worms. The Nuclear Sludge chew bar was introduced in 2007. The product range also includes Toxic Waste Sour Candy sprays.

== Toxic Waste Challenge ==
The packaging challenges consumers to keep a sour candy in their mouths for up to 60 seconds, with different labels assigned according to how long they last. Those reaching 60 seconds earn the title "Full Toxie Head". The packaging also warns that eating several pieces in quick succession may cause mouth irritation.

== Recalls ==
In January 2011, the U.S. distributor of the Toxic Waste Nuclear Sludge chew bar variety recalled the product, which was manufactured in Pakistan, due to lead contamination. At the time, the U.S. Food and Drug Administration (FDA) announced that it was unsafe to eat due to this contamination. The contamination was first detected by the California Department of Public Health, which found lead content in the candy at 0.31 parts per million, above the FDA maximum of foods being required to be below 0.1 parts per million.

In March 2011, the FDA determined that Toxic Waste Short Circuits bubble gum brand products imported into the U.S. from Pakistan had amounts of lead that exceeded FDA-allowable levels. The FDA determined that the product had 0.189 parts per million of lead.

On 5 October 2023, Candy Dynamics recalled approximately 70 million Toxic Waste Slime Licker Sour Rolling Liquid Candies in the United States because the rolling applicator ball could detach, posing a choking hazard. The U.S. Consumer Product Safety Commission reported two incidents involving detached balls, with no injuries reported.

In August 2025, Manchester Drinks Company recalled its Toxic Waste Sour Slushy drinks sold at Action stores in Germany because their glycerol content exceeded the level considered safe by Germany's Federal Institute for Risk Assessment (BfR). The recall covered 250 ml pouches sold since May 2024.

== See also ==
- List of candies
- List of confectionery brands
