= Sports Mixture =

British confectionery product

Sports Mix is a confectionery product manufactured in the UK under the brand-name of Maynards Bassetts, which is itself part of the Cadbury UK brand now owned by Mondelēz International and was formerly produced by Lion Confectionery. Both Maynards and Lion are owned by Cadbury UK, formerly Cadbury Trebor Bassett.

The Lion brand has since been adopted by Tangerine Confectionery who manufacture Sports Mix to the original Lion Confectionery version.

The product consists of fruit-flavoured hard gums in the shape of sports equipment and as at October 2015, the shapes found in the packs are interpreted as;

- Cricket ball and stumps
- Cricket bat
- Pedal cycle
- Ice skate
- Jersey, shirt or top, hoop design.
- Rugby ball
- Shorts
- Tennis racquet
- Sailing boat
- Quad bike

The gums come in five different colours; red, orange, black, yellow and green and each has its own flavour. The product used to contain liquorice flavoured pieces, but this has now been replaced by blackcurrant. The larger 2kg box still contains black, liquorice flavoured gums and is available on eBay or sold loose in traditional UK sweet (candy) shops.

The Maynard's Sports Mix contains the natural colours of anthocyanins, Carbon black, paprika extract, and lutein.

Nutritional Information	Per 100g	Per 5 sweets (22.5g)	Reference Intakes *
Energy	1475 kJ / 345 kcal	332 kJ / 78 kcal / 4% *	8400 kJ / 2000 kcal
Fat	0.2g	<0.1g	70g
of which Saturates	0.2g	<0.1g	20g
Carbohydrate	76.5g	17g	260g
of which Sugars	44g	9.8g	90g
Protein	9g	2g	50g
Salt	0.07g	0.02g	6g

(*) Percentage reference intake of an average adult (8400 kJ / 2000 kcal)

It is not suitable for vegetarians because it contains gelatin.
