= Wine gum =

Gelatin-based chewy candy

Wine Gum
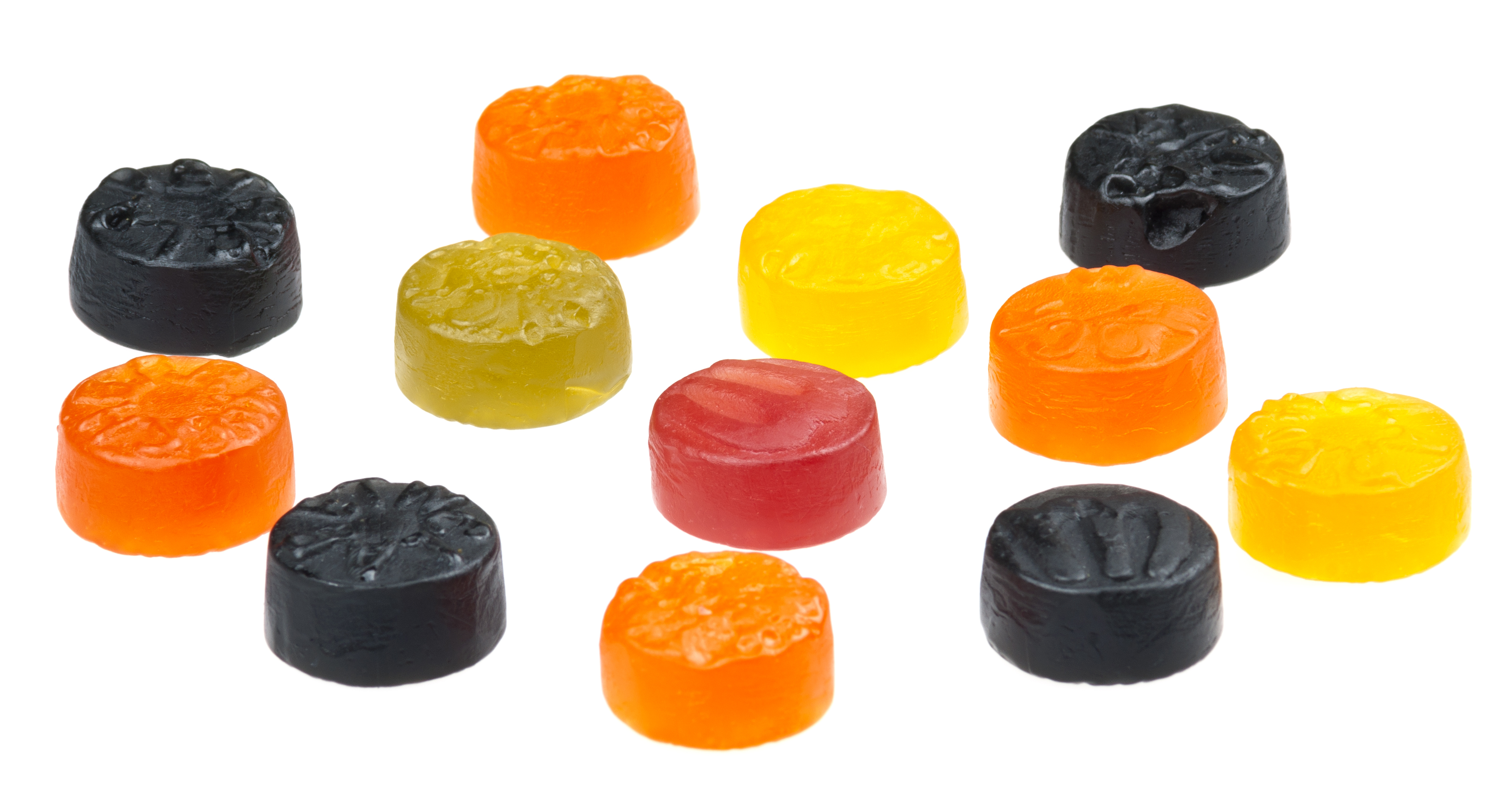
- An assortment of Maynards wine gums
- Type: Confectionery
- Place of origin: United Kingdom
- Created by: Charles Gordon Maynard
- Invented: 1909
- Main ingredients: Gelatine, sugar, citric acid, fruit flavouring

Wine gums are chewy, firm pastille-type sweets originating from the United Kingdom. All brands have their own recipes containing various sweeteners, flavourings and colourings. Wine gums are popular in the United Kingdom, Canada, Ireland, South Africa and many Commonwealth nations, as well as several European countries. Common brands include Maynards, Bassett's, Haribo and Lion.

The gums usually come in five shapes: kidney, crown, rhombus, circle and oblong, and are usually labelled with the name of a wine; for example, Maynards use port, sherry, burgundy and claret. Other manufacturers may prefer different names (and sometimes other varieties of alcohol entirely) such as rioja, merlot or rum. Despite the name, they usually contain no alcohol, and depending on local laws or manufacturer's practices, packages may bear a specific statement that the sweets "contain no wine".

== History ==
Charles Riley Maynard started his business in 1880 by producing confections in a kitchen with his brother Tom in Stamford Hill, London, while his wife Sarah Ann served the customers. Maynards sweets grew steadily and was launched as a company in 1896. Maynards Wine Gums were introduced in 1909 by Maynard's son Charles Gordon Maynard. It took Charles Gordon Maynard some time to persuade his strict Methodist and teetotaller father that the sweets did not contain wine, after which the father accepted that the sweet was to be marketed as an alternative to alcohol.

According to confectionery company Cadbury, red and black are the most popular colours. The red flavours are traditionally red berry, strawberry, cherry, or raspberry. Black is traditionally blackcurrant flavoured. In 2010, a limited "fruit duos" edition was produced with two colours and flavours in each gum.

== See also ==
- Bubble gum
- Chewing gum
- DOTS
- Grether's Pastilles
- Gumdrop
- Gummy candy
- Jelly baby
- Jujube
- Jujyfruits
- Midget Gems (also known as Mini Gems)
- Rowntree's Fruit Pastilles
- Swedish Fish
