= Dolly mixture =

British confection

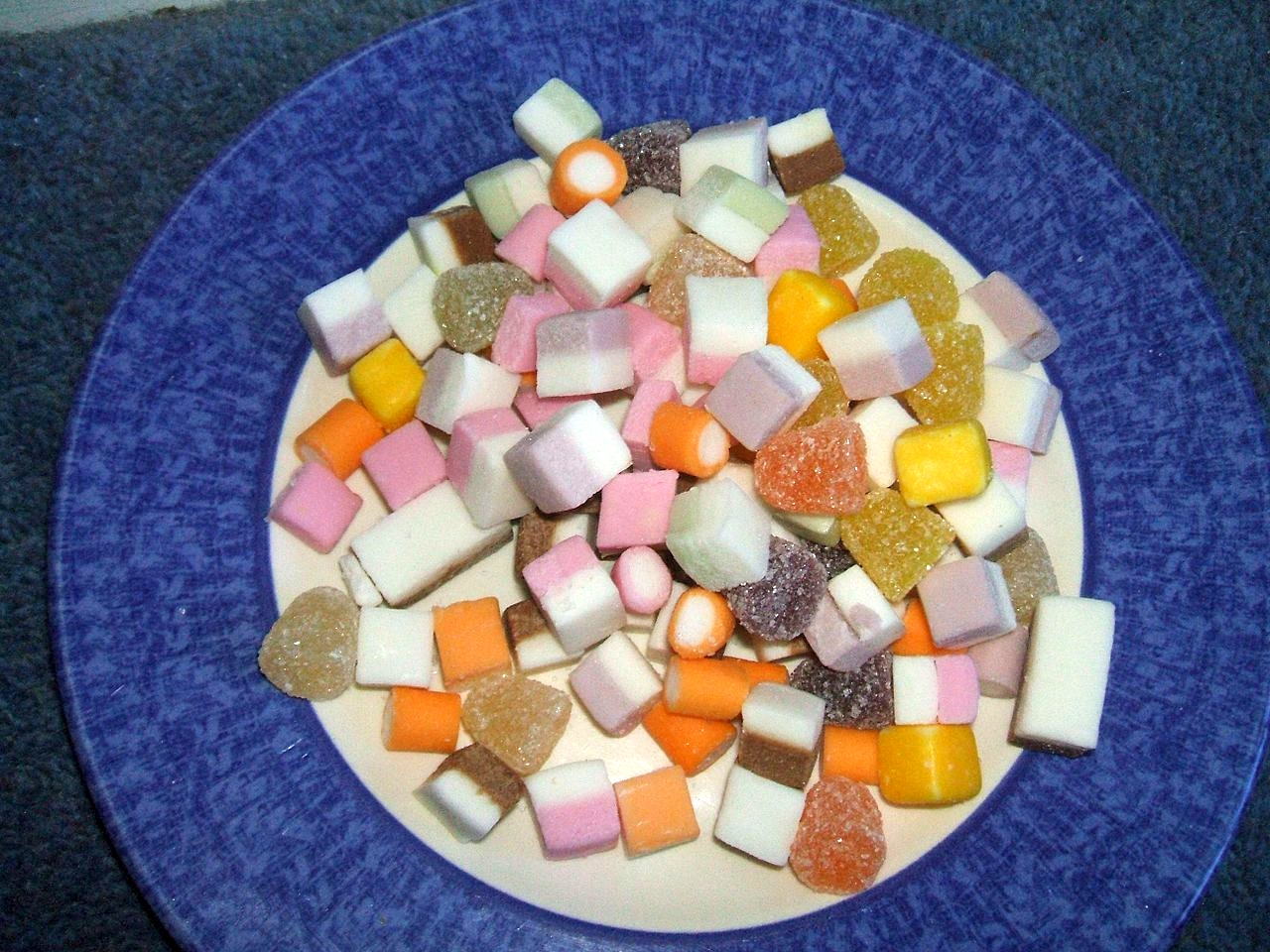
A plate of dolly mixture

Dolly mixture is a British confection, consisting of a variety of multi-coloured fondant shapes, such as cubes and cylinders with subtle flavourings, and sugar-coated jellies. They are considered a sweeter alternative to the more bitter liquorice allsorts and are primarily aimed at young children.

In the UK, a variety of dolly mixture sold as Dolly Mix is produced under the Barratt brand, owned by Valeo Confectionery.

In 2022, UK supermarket chain Iceland introduced a Dolly Mix flavour ice cream to its range of Barratt-themed products.

The Goon Show character Bluebottle was frequently rewarded or bribed with a quantity of dolly mixture, jelly babies, or similar sweets.

== See also ==
- Liquorice allsorts
