= List of breath mints =

This is a list of breath mint brands in alphabetical order. A breath mint is a type of candy primarily consumed to freshen the smell of one's breath, by masking offensive odors with the scent of mint or other flavoring, and by stimulating the flow of saliva to help remove food and bacterial debris from the mouth. Like chewing gums and throat lozenges, many breath mints are artificially sweetened and consumed solely for non-nutritive purposes.

== Breath mint brands ==
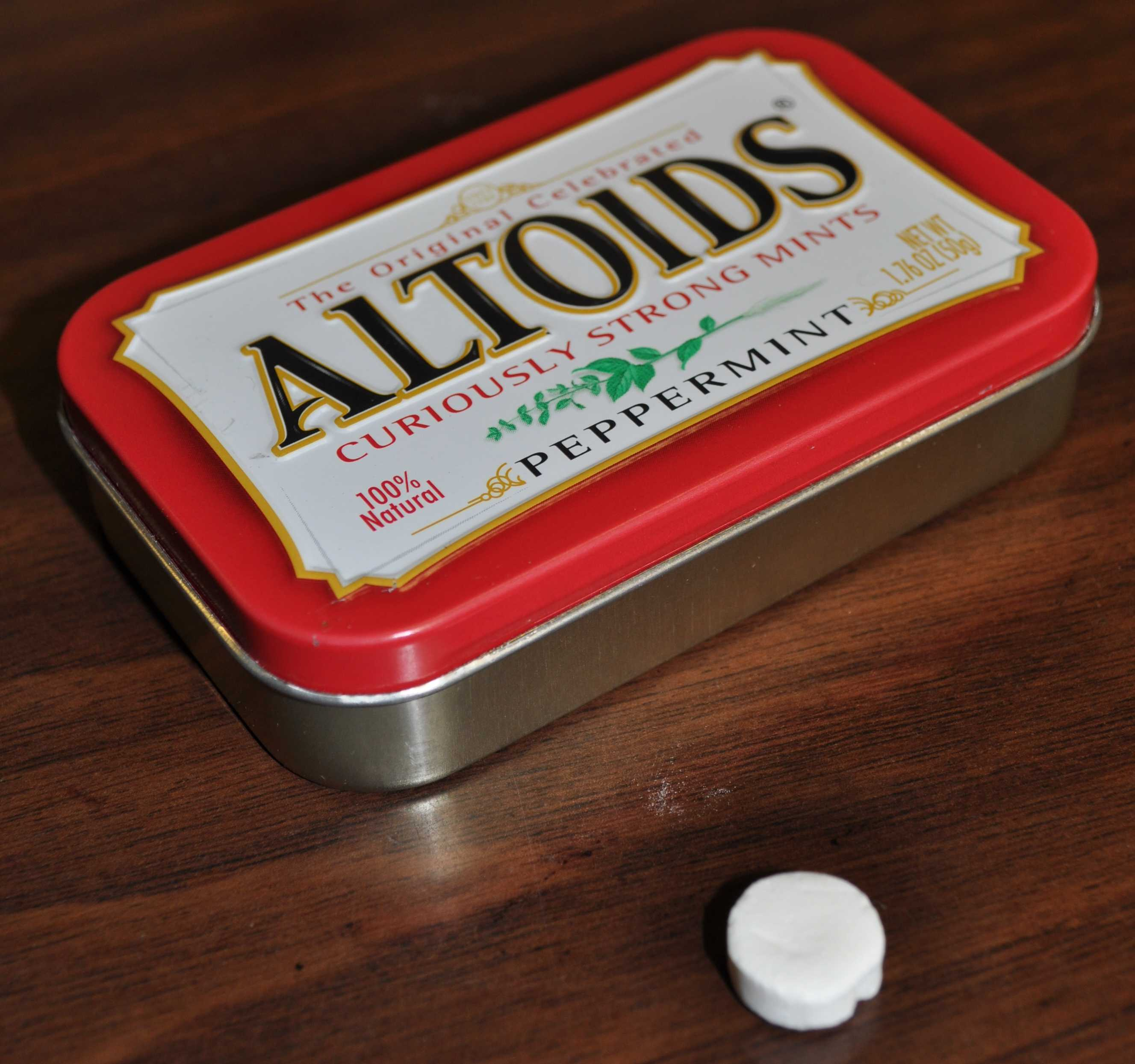
Altoids

Name	Company	Year introduced	Country of origin
Altoids	Callard & Bowser	1780s	United Kingdom
Barkleys	Tuttle & Co.	1996	United States
Breath Savers	Hershey	1973	United States
Certs	Mondelēz International	1956	United States
Chlormint	Perfetti Van Melle	1997	India
C. Howard's Fine Mints and Gums	C. Howard's Violet Candies	c. 1930s	United States
Cinnaburst	Cadbury		United Kingdom
Clorets	Cadbury Adams	1951	United States
Dentyne Mints	Cadbury	1899	United Kingdom
Eclipse	Wrigley	1999	United States
Euromints	Eurobrand		United States
Excel	Wrigley	1991	United States
Extra	Wrigley	1984	United States
Extra Strong Mints	Trebor	1935	United Kingdom
Fisherman's Friend	Lofthouse company	1865	United Kingdom
Fox's Glacier Mints	Fox's Confectionery	1918	United Kingdom
Frisk	Frisk International	1986	Belgium
Great Bite	Ferrara Pan Candy Company	c. 2008	China
Halls	Mondelez International	1930s	United Kingdom
Ice Breakers	Hershey	1996	United States
Ipso	Nicholas International Ltd.	c. 1970s	United Kingdom
Jila	Ferndale Confectionery	c. 1990s	Australia
Life Savers	Mars, Incorporated	1912	United States
Maxx Menthol	Universal Robina Corporation		Philippines
Mentos	Perfetti Van Melle	1948	Netherlands
Mintia	Asahi Breweries	1996	Japan
Mintha	Mintha products	2024	Canada
Minties	Nestlé	1922	Australia
Momints	Yosha Enterprises Corporation	2003	United States
Mynthon	Cloetta	1970	Finland
Negro (candy)	Gyori Keksz	1920	Hungary
Penguin Mints	ifive brands	1998	United States
Peppersmith	Peppersmith	2009	United Kingdom
Polo	Rowntree's	1948	United Kingdom
Pulmoll	Kalfany, Zertus	1945	France
Ricola	Ricola AG	1940	Switzerland
Sen-Sen	F&F Foods, Inc.	c. late 19th century	United States
Silvermints	Clarendon Confectionary	1920s	Ireland
Sisu	Leaf International	1928	Finland
Smint	Chupa Chups	1994	Spain
Tic Tac	Ferrero	1969	Italy
Trebors	Cadbury	1907	United Kingdom
Velamints	Ragold Inc	1977	Germany
Vigroids	Ernest Jackson & Company Ltd	1900	United Kingdom
Pastilha Garoto	Garoto	1934	Brazil

== See also ==
- List of chewing gum brands
- List of confectionery brands
- Cough drops, also known as throat lozenges
- Mint
- Spearmint
- Peppermint
- Wintergreen
- Candy cane
- Humbug
