= Momints =

Breath mint

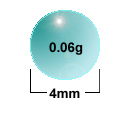
Momints
Formal name	Momints
Classification	Breath mint
Description	Liquid mint
Form	Sphere
Displacement	33.5mm^{3} (approx.)
Mass	0.06g (approx.)
Ingredients	Medium chain triglycerides, flavor, gelatin, sorbitol, glycerin, acesulfame potassium, sucralose, aspartame, thaumatin, color.
Nutrition Information	Per mint: Calories 0, Fat 0g, Sodium 0g, Carbohydrates 0g, Sugars 0g, Sugar Alcohol 0g, Protein 0g.
Active Ingredients	None
Flavors	Peppermint, Cinnamon, WinterBurst
Sugar Free?	Yes
Manufacturer	Yosha! Enterprises
Year introduced	2003
Slogans / Taglines	Take a/Seize the/Enjoy the Momint.
Related products	None
Hazards	food coloring, phenylalanine, eye contact hazard, dispenser is choking hazard.

Momints was an American breath mint manufactured by Yosha! Enterprises Corporation, headed by President and CEO Tony Shurman. The company was founded in the United States and based in Westfield, New Jersey.) The product was introduced in 2003; Yosha! Enterprises is now defunct and the trademark for Momints expired in 2010.

== History ==
We then had sort of the next evolution of breath mint technology in these liquid-filled capsules that look really cool. Super fun name, M-O-M-I-N-T-S. We had an incredible rise and then this spectacular fall.

— Tony Shurman, Portland Press-Herald

Shurman founded Yosha! after receiving a payout when Pfizer bought Warner-Lambert. He developed Momints as a product initially targeting smokers. An iridescent, translucent sphere resembling a glass bead, the innovative product pioneered the category of liquid-filled mints. Momints' liquid mint solution (not true mint, as it contained no mint oil) was encased in a soluble gelatin shell. Biting the shell released the liquid contents.

The "Momints" brand name was chosen as a play on "moments"; advertising tag lines included "take a Momint", "seize the Momint", and "enjoy the Momint." The company used PR firm Vorticom after initially struggling to gain media attention.

The liquid mints niche pioneered by Momints was soon populated by similar products including Ice Breakers Liquid Ice from Hershey and Hiya Mints from Webb Candy. Yosha! responded to Hershey's entry with a snarky statement characterizing Hershey as a "Johnny-come-lately Goliath" whose ad campaign featuring "bubble-headed celebrity siblings who feign disputes over whether a product is liquid or ice" (teen star Hilary Duff and her sister Hailey were featured in the Hershey ad campaign) was of no interest to Momint's "intellectually gifted and sophisticated consumers".

In a marketing move for Christmas of 2004, Yosha! offered free Momints to mall Santas, the putative point being to prevent child-offending halitosis among this cohort. According to Tony Shurman, the result was a spike in sales as well as long-term brand awareness.

By 2005, Momints were the top selling mint at 7-Eleven and were garnering $15 million in annual revenue. In 2005, Yosha! set up a German operation and began selling Momints in Germany.

== Packaging ==
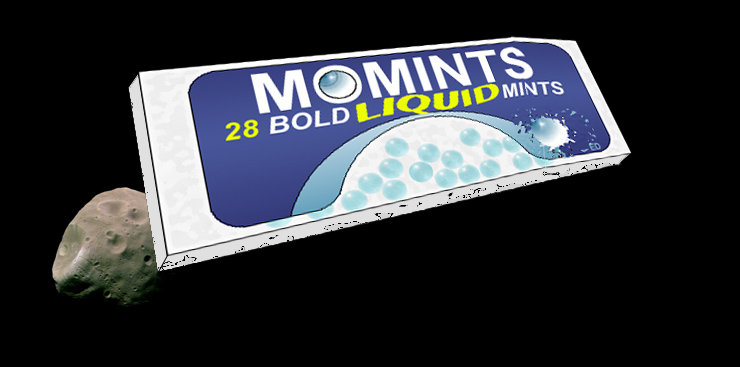
Artist's conception of a package of Momints in close approach to Phobos, the largest moon of Mars. Stickney Crater is seen on the left.

Momints were originally packaged in a transparent plastic package, designed to fit into a cigarette packet wrapper or watch pocket. The box was a rectangular solid, except that at one short end the top sloped down to meet the base. The other end contained a hinged door, which opened to give to access to an internal chute. Individual Momints were dispensed through this chute. This package was styled the "E-Z Slide Pack". 28 Momints were contained in each package.

The product was offered in green (peppermint), blue (winter burst), and red (cinnamon) versions.

By 2005, Momints were also being sold in clear tubes containing eight Momints. A more premium "super tube" containing 15 of the eight-count tubes was also offered. The super tube contained a mix of the three flavors. The venues for the initial rollout of the tubes were Wal-Mart, 7-Eleven, CVS, Eckerd, Wawa, Stewart's, and Barnes & Noble College Bookstores.

According to Tony Shurman, the tube packaging – designed by the Canadian branding and package design firm Zaunscherb – was inspired by tubes used for cosmetics. The tube design initially envisioned glass tubes, but plastic was used when the product was marketed.
