= Ipsos (disambiguation) =

Ipsos is a market research company.

Ipsos may also refer to:

- Ipsos, a village on Corfu
- Ipsos (Phrygia), a town of ancient Phrygia, now in Turkey
- Battle of Ipsos, a battle fought near that town in 301 BCE
- Ipso (candy), a candy
- IPSOS, a magical formula
