= Tic Tac =

Brand of small, hard candy mints

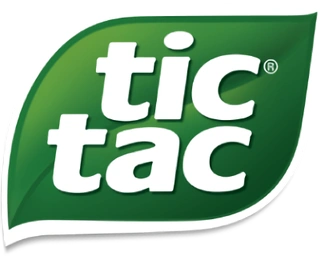

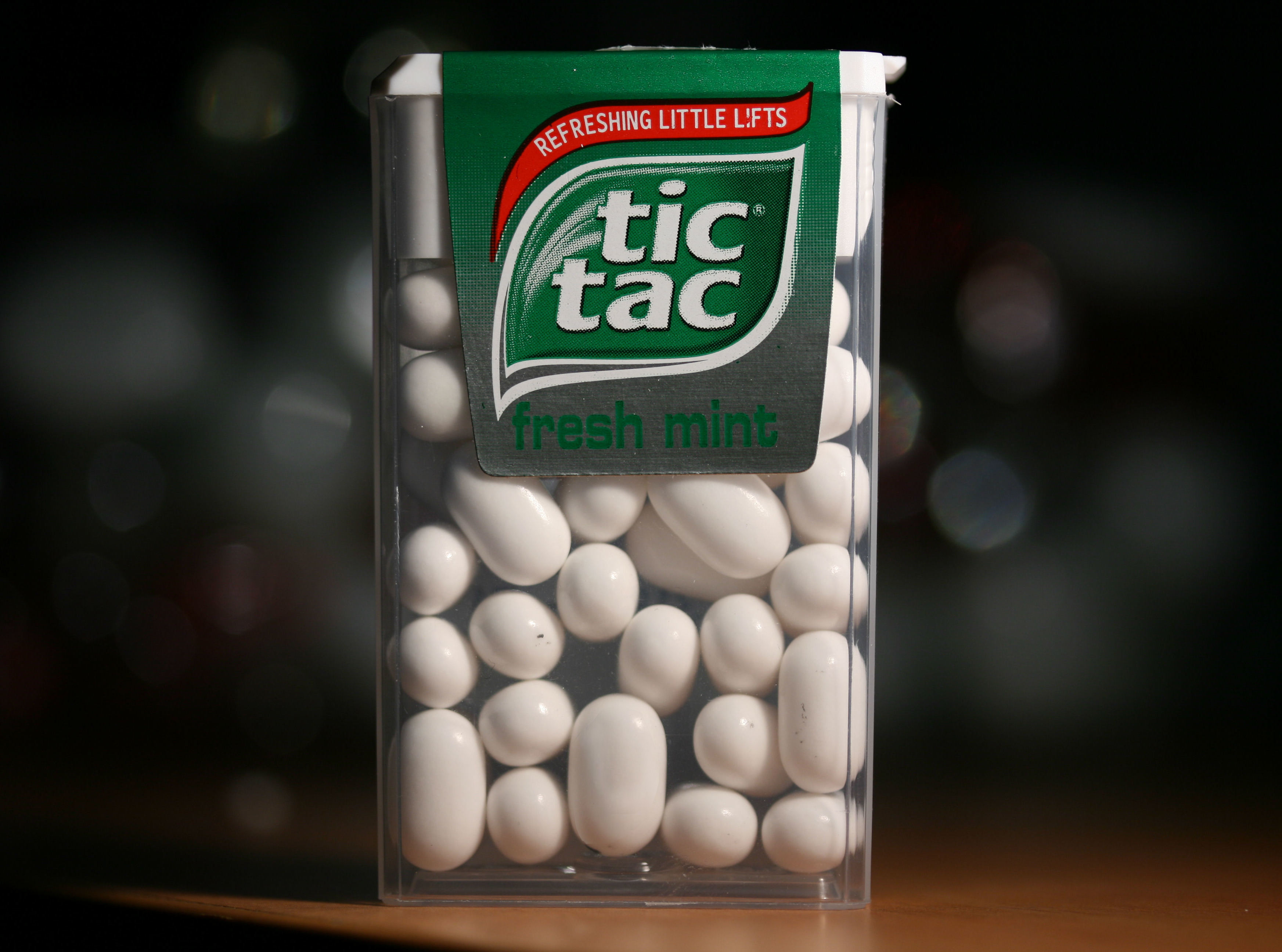
- Product type: Breath mints
- Current owner: Ferrero
- Country: Italy
- Introduced: 1969; 57 years ago
- Markets: Worldwide
- Website: ferrero.it/tic-tac

Tic Tac (stylised in lowercase) is a brand of small, hard mint manufactured by the Italian company Ferrero. They were first produced in 1969 and are now available in a variety of flavours in over 100 countries.

Tic Tacs are typically sold in small transparent plastic boxes with a flip-action living hinge lid. Originally, Tic Tacs were dyed specific colours for different flavours, although in many countries the transparent plastic boxes are now coloured while the Tic Tacs themselves are white.

Tic Tac has featured advertising that emphasises the low calorie count of the mints. Most flavours have approximately 1.9 calories per mint.

== History ==
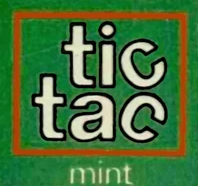
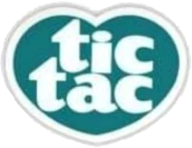
The first logo of the company, as of 1969, and the 1970 version, with a heart shape around the text.

Tic Tac were first introduced by Ferrero in 1969, under the name "Refreshing Mints". In 1970, the name was changed to Tic Tac, after the distinctive clicking sound made by the pack being opened and closed. Besides the original mint and orange flavours, several new varieties were added, including aniseed, cinnamon (or "Winter Warmer"), an orange and lime mix (in 1976), spearmint, peppermint, Powermint, sour apple, mandarin, tangerine, berry, fresh orange, strawberry, wintergreen, pink grapefruit, orange and lime together (in 1978), cherry, passionfruit (in 2007), pomegranate (in 2010), mango, lime, and popcorn (2014). The grape flavour was eliminated in 1976 because of health concerns about the red dye amaranth (FD&C Red #2), a suspected carcinogen.

Other offerings have included holiday gift packs for Christmas, Easter, and Valentine's Day.

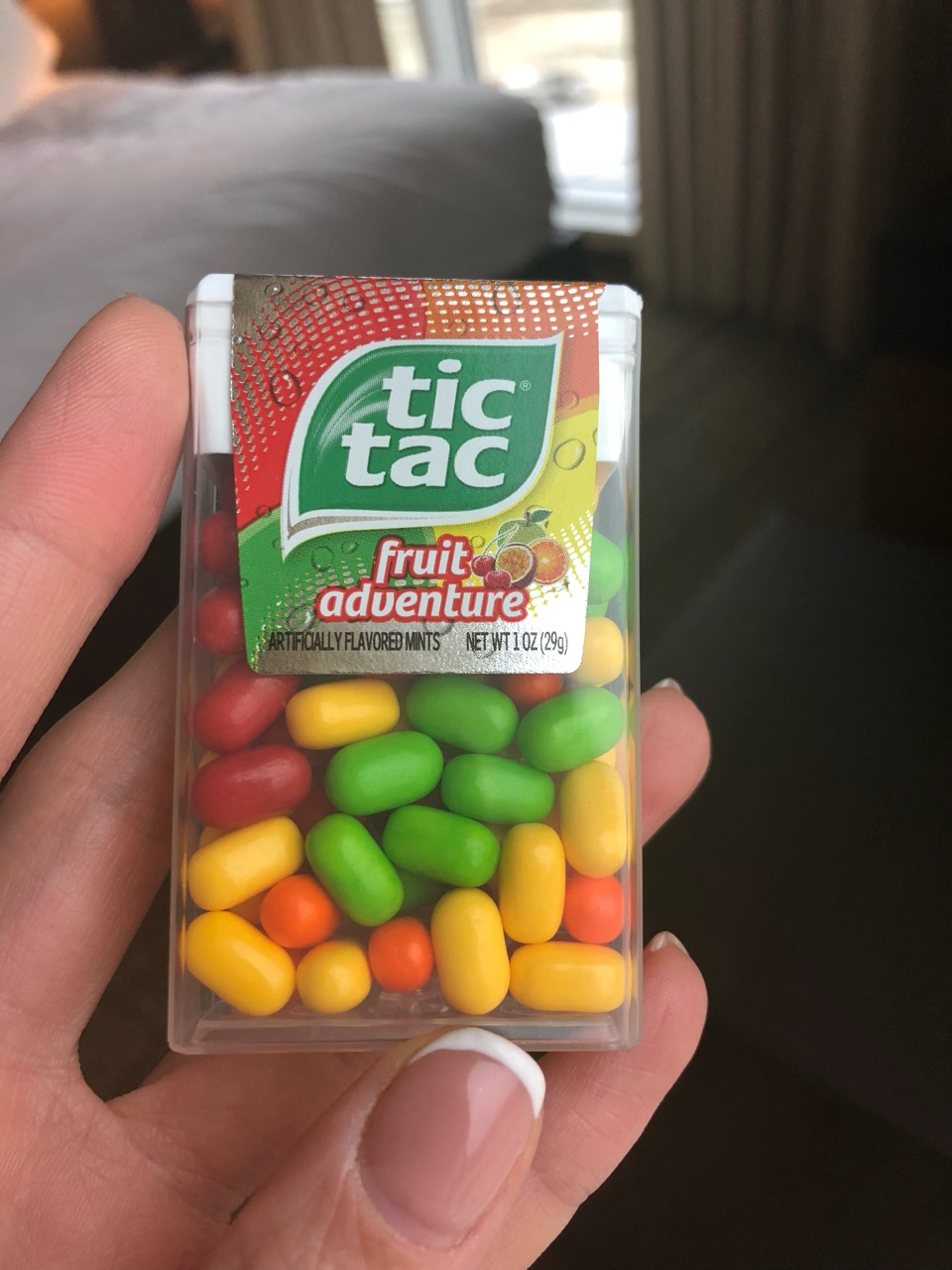
Tic Tac "Fruit Adventure"

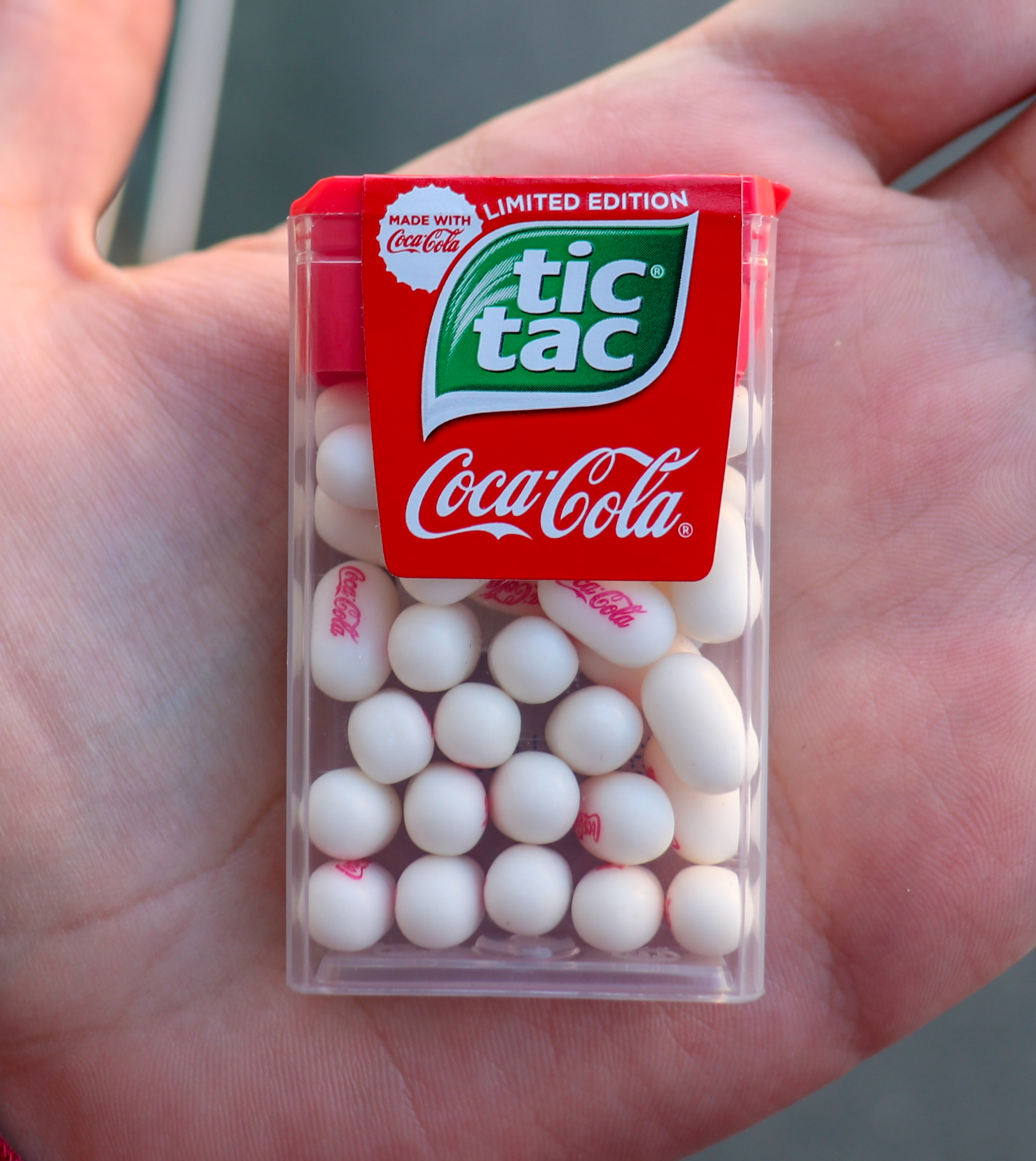
Tic Tac "Coca-Cola" limited edition

Since 1980, the Tic Tac slogan in the United States has been "The 1½ Calorie Breath Mint." In the United Kingdom, France, Republic of Ireland, Italy and Australia, Tic Tacs are noted as being less than two calories with the slogan "Two hours of Tic Tac freshness in less than two calories." In Canada, New Zealand and Australia, and used once in the United States, the Tic Tac slogan is "It's not just a mint, it's a Tic Tac." In India, the Tic Tac slogan is "Refreshment to be shared."

During the 1990s, "double packs" were introduced, featuring a regular Tic Tac container with two flavours inside. Available combinations included Tangerine and Lime, Orange and Grape, and Berry and Cherry.

In 2006, Tic Tac introduced a "Bold" edition with more intense flavours of Mint and Fruit.

During May 2010, Australia's Trademark Registrar office rejected Ferrero's application to trademark their Tic Tac container as "not being unique enough to distinguish its products from other manufacturers."

Tic Tac sometimes provides limited editions to promote films and television shows, such as a banana and mandarin flavour for the 2015 movie Minions. Orange Tic Tacs featured prominently in the 2007 film Juno, in an orange box with white colour mints as sold in Canada and Brazil. The Simpsons were also a part of a marketing campaign with four different flavours featuring custom The Simpsons labelling; Blueberry, Bubblegum, Buzz Cola, and Donut. Tic Tac introduced a limited edition Coca-Cola flavour in 2020,, Sprite in 2023 and Dr Pepper in 2026.

== Manufacturing ==
Thirty-five percent of the world's Tic Tacs are manufactured at the Ferrero factory in Cork, Ireland.

Tic Tacs are also manufactured in Australia, Canada, India and Ecuador.

== Nutrition facts ==
Tic Tacs
Nutritional value per 100 g (3.5 oz)
- Energy: 1,663 kJ (397 kcal)
- Carbohydrates: 97.5 g
- Fat: 0.4 g
- Protein: 0.1 g
- ^{†}Percentages estimated using US recommendations for adults.

For Fresh mint (Europe/US/Canada); Peppermint (Australia)

=== Nutritional information ===
- Per 100 g – Energy 1,663 kilojoules (397 kcal), Protein 0.1 g, Carbohydrate 97.5 g, Fat 0.4 g.
- Per Tic Tac – Energy 8 kilojoules (1.9 kcal), Protein 0 g, Carbohydrate 0.5 g, Fat 0 g.

=== Ingredients ===
Sugar, fructose, maltodextrin, peppermint essential oil, rice starch, gum arabic, filling agent (magnesium salts of fatty acids), glazing agent (carnauba wax).

Each pack weighs 15–18 grams (0.53–0.63 oz) and contains about 38 Tic Tacs. New packs in Australia and Canada weigh 24 g and contain 50 Tic Tacs, and the Tic Tac "100 pack" weighs 49 g and contains 100 Tic Tacs. The "Big Pack" weighs 29 g and contains 60 Tic Tacs. The "Bottle Pack" weighs 98g and contains 200 Tic Tacs. In the UK packs are 16.4 grams (0.58 oz) and contain 22 Tic Tacs.

In the United States, the sugar content of Tic Tacs is listed as 0 g despite the mints being approximately 90% sugar (depending on the flavour). This stems from the fact that a serving size is one 0.49 g mint, and the American Food and Drug Administration permits manufacturers to list sugar (or other nutritional components) as 0 g if they contain less than 0.5 g. In at least some jurisdictions, the 0 g now features a footnote that clarifies "less than 0.5 g".

== See also ==
- Smint
- Certs
- Mentos
- Altoids
- Ipso (candy)
- Breath Savers
