= Riley's Toffee Rolls =

Brand of toffee launched in 1907

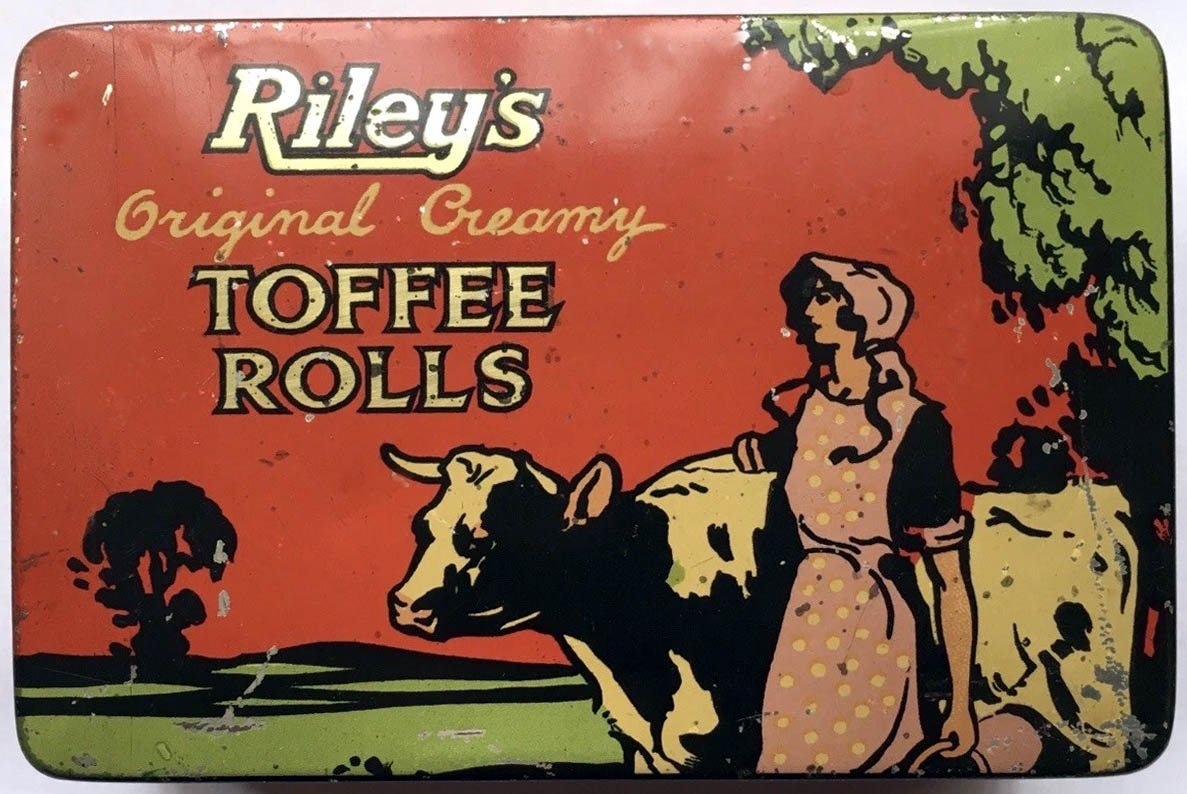
- Toffee Rolls tin c. 1920s
- Product type: Toffee
- Produced by: Ella Riley Ltd (2008–present); Callard & Bowser (1951–1995); Riley Brothers, (Halifax) Ltd. (1907–51)
- Country: United Kingdom
- Introduced: 1907; 119 years ago
- Previous owners: List: Ella Riley Ltd (2008–present); Kraft Foods (1993–95); United Biscuits (1988–1993); Beatrice Foods (1982–1988); Arthur Guinness & Sons (1951–1982)

Riley's Toffee Rolls is a brand of toffee launched in 1907 and originally made by "Riley Brothers (Halifax) Limited" of Halifax, founded by Fred Riley & John Herbert Riley. Toffees were made from a recipe given to them by their mother.

The brand was relaunched in 2008, manufactured by the niece of the founders of Riley's.

== History ==
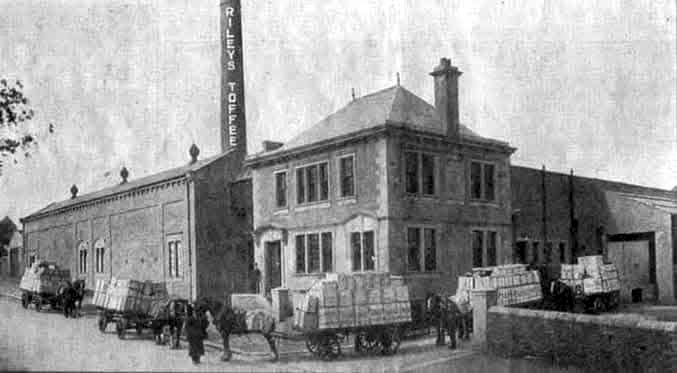
Rilay's toffe factory (current McVities factory) in Halifax, were the Toffee Rolls were produced, as seen in 1914

Toffees were manufactured at the Riley Brothers' Hopwood Lane factory in Halifax, which is now a McVitie's site.

In 1953, due to the death of John Herbert Riley, the surviving brother sold the company to William Nuttall and after a number of corporate purchases the company ended up in control of Kraft PLC and produced at the Callard & Bowser operation at their Bridgend Plant.

In the mid-1990s the decision was made to discontinue production of Riley's Toffee Rolls in favour of increased production of the Altoid mint.

In 2008 a woman named Freya Sykes discovered a recipe book called Economical Cooking given to her by her Granny Ella Riley; in the front was the hand written recipe which was given to her by her uncles, Fred & John Herbert Riley. The recipe was for the original Riley's Toffee Rolls and after filing for IP rights the Riley Toffee Rolls was reborn, now with a slightly softer texture to fit modern taste.
