= Chris Brasher Sporting Life Trophy =

The Chris Brasher Sporting Life Trophy is a trophy that is awarded annually to the elite male and female winners of the London Marathon. It was previously awarded to the winners of the Polytechnic Marathon between 1909 and 1961 which was staged between Windsor in Berkshire and various locations in London.

The creation of the trophy was instigated by Jack Andrew, the secretary of the London Polytechnic Harriers athletics club in the wake of the popularity of the marathon after the 1908 Summer Olympics in London. Andrew approached William Will, the editor of the Sporting Life, who agreed to fund a trophy for a new annual marathon race in London.

The trophy was made by London's Goldsmiths and Silversmiths Company and cost £500. It was funded by Eleanor, the widow of William McFarlane, the former owner of Sporting Life.

The trophy is 4 ft 6 in (1.37 m) high. The Sporting Life withdrew the trophy from the Polytechnic Marathon in 1962 after several years of failing finances for the race. The Sporting Life was then owned by Mirror Group Newspapers who declined to fund the event any further. The marathon was subsequently sponsored by Callard & Bowser, who made a butterscotch energy food. The trophy was subsequently stored at the headquarters of the Sporting Life for several years until 1969 when it was presented to the Polytechnic Harriers in perpetuity with the proviso that the club "the best means and method that will fulfill the original purpose of the trophy"; the original purpose being to "encourage long distance running in Great Britain".

It was renamed in honour of Chris Brasher shortly before the 2003 London Marathon.
