= Great Bite =

Brand of confectionery

Great Bite is a value-priced product line of breath mints and fruit-flavored hard candies. The product line has shark-themed branding, including the appearance of shark bite marks on the packaging and labels. The candies are manufactured in China. In 2011, exclusive rights to distribute the Great Bite line of mints and candies were sold to Ferrara Pan Candy Company.

== See also ==
- List of breath mints
- List of confectionery brands
