= Penguin Mints =

Brand of caffeinated mints

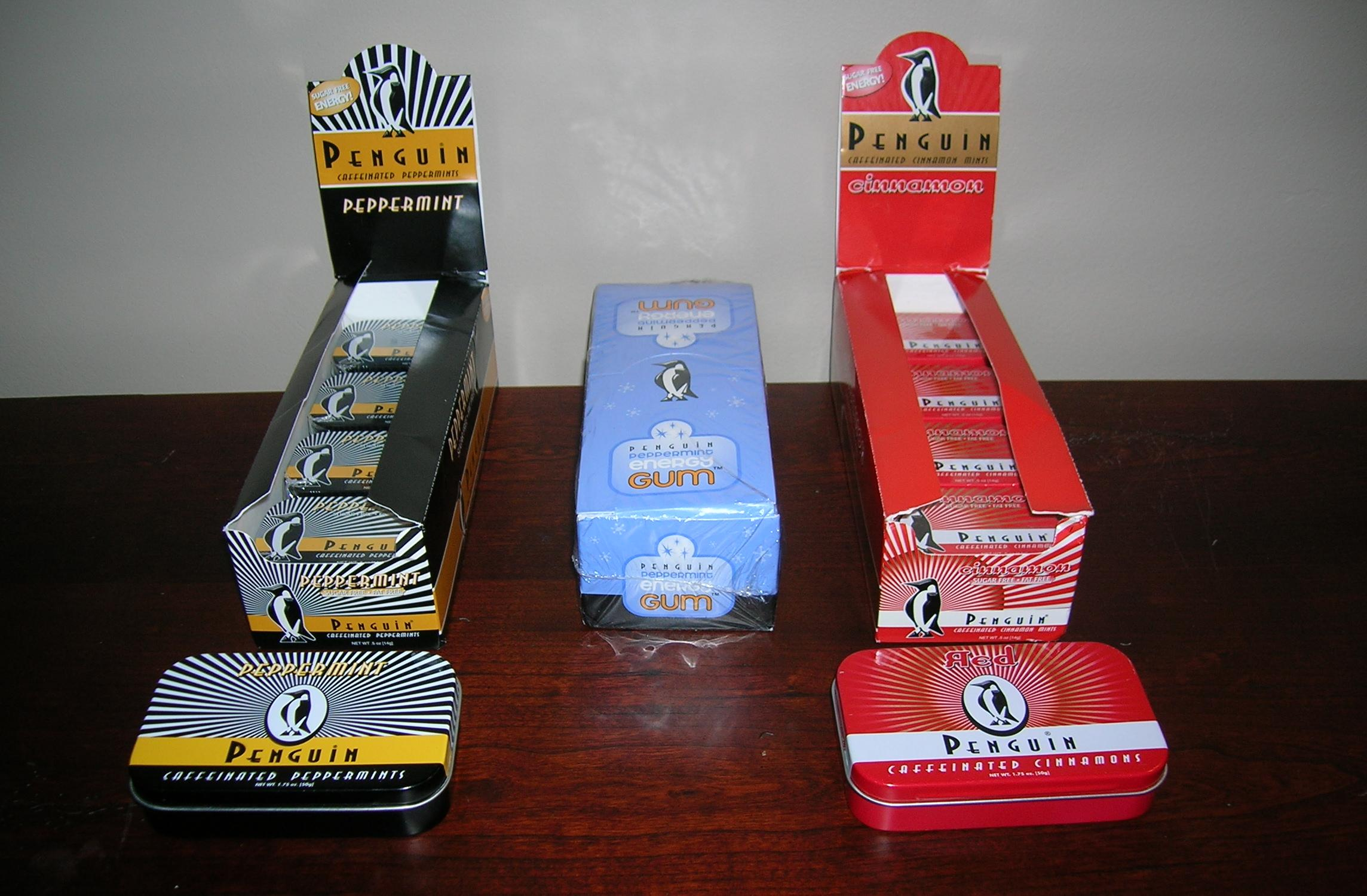
Penguin Caffeinated peppermints, energy gum, and cinnamon mints.

Penguin Mints was a brand of caffeinated mints made by Seattle-based ifive brands. The company also produced caffeinated "energy gum", as well as non-caffeinated mints. The brand was introduced in 1998.

== List of products ==
- Caffeinated Peppermints
- Caffeinated Cinnamon Mints
- Caffeinated Chocolate Mints
- Peppermint Energy Gum
- Citrus Energy Gum
- Kola Energy Gum
- Penguin Lights Decaffeinated Peppermints

== Active ingredients ==
All three varieties of caffeinated mints contained 7mg of caffeine per mint. Five mints were approximately equal to one 12 ounce can of cola.

The energy gum products also contained 7mg of caffeine per piece. In addition, the Kola Energy Gum contained Ginseng and the Citrus Energy Gum contained Taurine and Guarana.

Nutritional Facts from the penguin caffeinated mints website in 2006

== See also ==
- List of breath mints
