= Ipso (candy) =

Confectionery brand

- Packaging for Ipso mint flavour, circa 1970s–1980s, designed to resemble Lego-style building blocks
- Product type: Confectionery
- Introduced: 1979
- Discontinued: ca. late 1980s
- Markets: Great Britain and the United States
- Previous owners: Nicholas International Ltd.
- Tagline: "A little refreshment will take you a long way"

Ipso was a drop-style sweet manufactured by Nicholas International Ltd. and sold in Great Britain and the United States during the 1970s through 1980s. Ipso sweets were similar to Tic Tac and were produced in four flavours, strawberry, lemon, orange, and mint. The packaging was designed to resemble interlocking toy plastic building bricks like Lego, allowing the boxes to be stacked or connected. The boxes came in four colours reflecting the flavour of the candy inside: red for strawberry, green for lemon, orange for orange, and blue for mint.

The advertising campaign, "Ipso Calypso", featured a man eating the sweets and daydreaming about West Indian and Jamaican dancers on a train platform. A woman interrupted the man's daydream to warn him that he would miss his train. The tagline for the sweets was "A little refreshment will take you a long way".

== See also ==
- Tart 'n' Tinys, a somewhat similar defunct American sweet
- Hard candy
- Breath mint
- List of breath mints
