= Silvermints =

Hard confectionary from Ireland

Silvermints is an Irish sugar-based peppermint-flavoured hard sweet or candy.

Clarendon Confectionery, part of the Jacob Fruitfield Food Group, first introduced Silvermints in the 1920s. Traditionally sold in a foil-packed tube, as of 2006 they are also sold in a 120g cello bag.

== See also ==
- List of breath mints
