= Breath Savers =

Brand of mint candy made by Hershey's

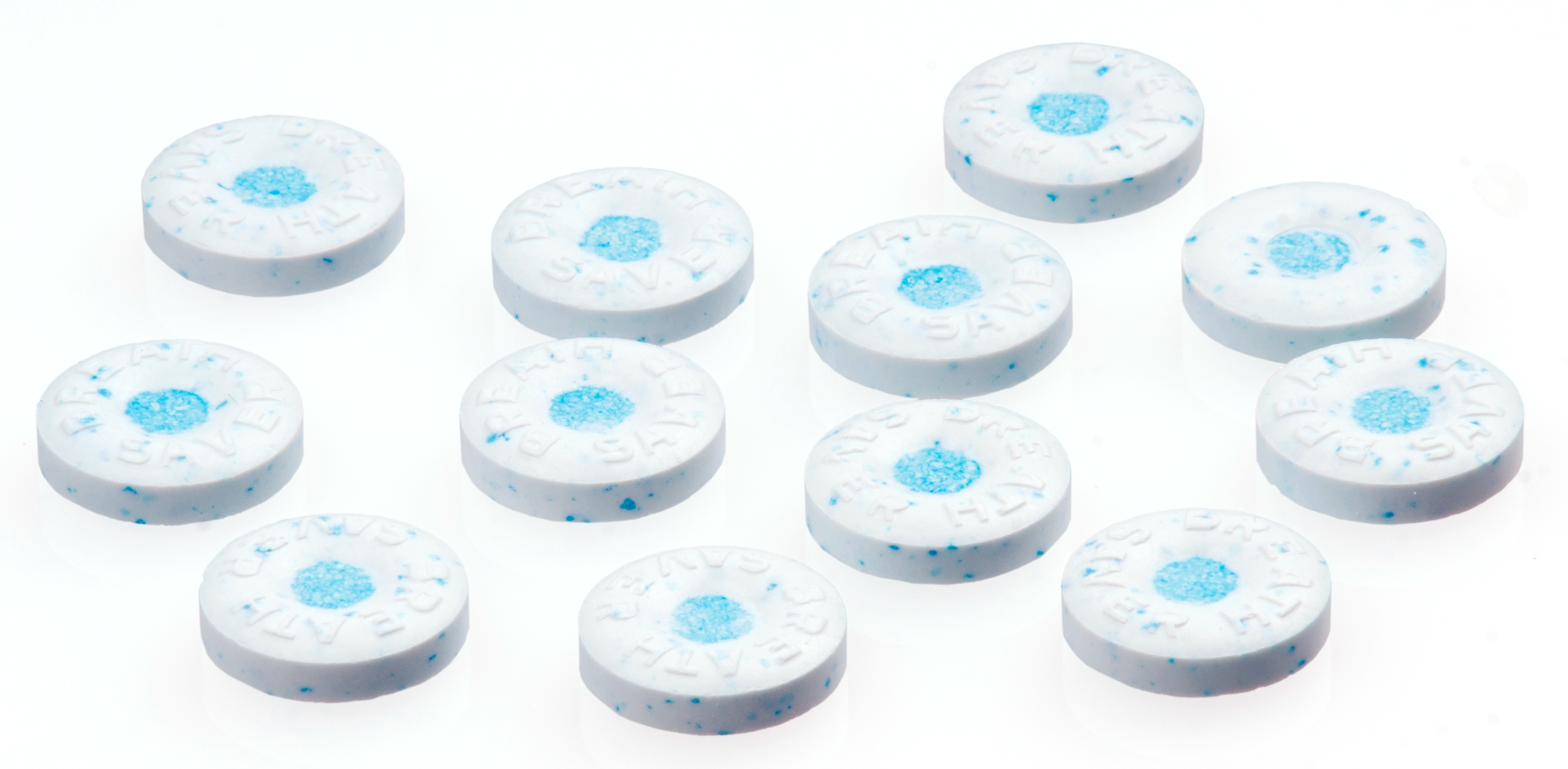
- Flavored mints available in Peppermint, Wintergreen, Spearmint, and Cinnamon.
- Product type: Mint
- Current owner: The Hershey Company
- Produced by: The Hershey Company
- Introduced: 1973; 53 years ago
- Markets: United States
- Previous owners: E. R. Squibb
- Tagline: Break Open The Breath Savers; A Mint with More
- Website: www.hersheyland.com/breath-savers

Breath Savers is a brand of mint manufactured by the Hershey Company.

== History ==
Breath Savers were introduced in 1973 by the Life Savers Company, a division of E.R. Squibb, in limited areas, and were originally sugared. The brand became a national brand in 1978 when it replaced sugar with saccharin and became sugar-free from then on. Nabisco acquired the Life Savers Company from E.R. Squibb in 1981. In 2000, after its merger with Kraft Foods, Nabisco sold its gum and breath mint business to Hershey.

== Ingredients ==
The main ingredient found in Breath Savers is sorbitol, a sugar alcohol containing one-third the calories of sugar and which is 60 percent the sweetness of sugar. In addition to sorbitol, Breath Savers also contains small amounts of aspartame and natural flavors.

Breath Savers have also begun advertising some of their mints to contain sodium bicarbonate, an alkaline salt used in many personal hygiene products as a mechanical cleanser on the teeth and gums. It also neutralizes the production of acid in the mouth, and acts as an antiseptic to help prevent infections.

== See also ==
- Life Savers
- Polo Mints
- List of breath mints
