= Ice Breakers candy =

Confectionery brand by Hershey Company

Ice Breakers
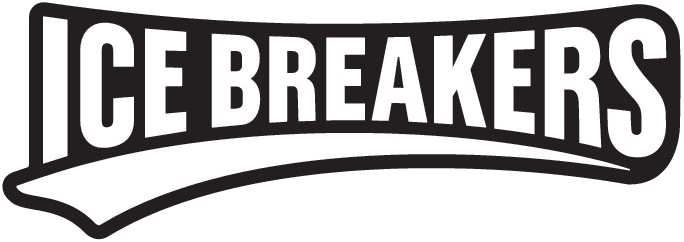

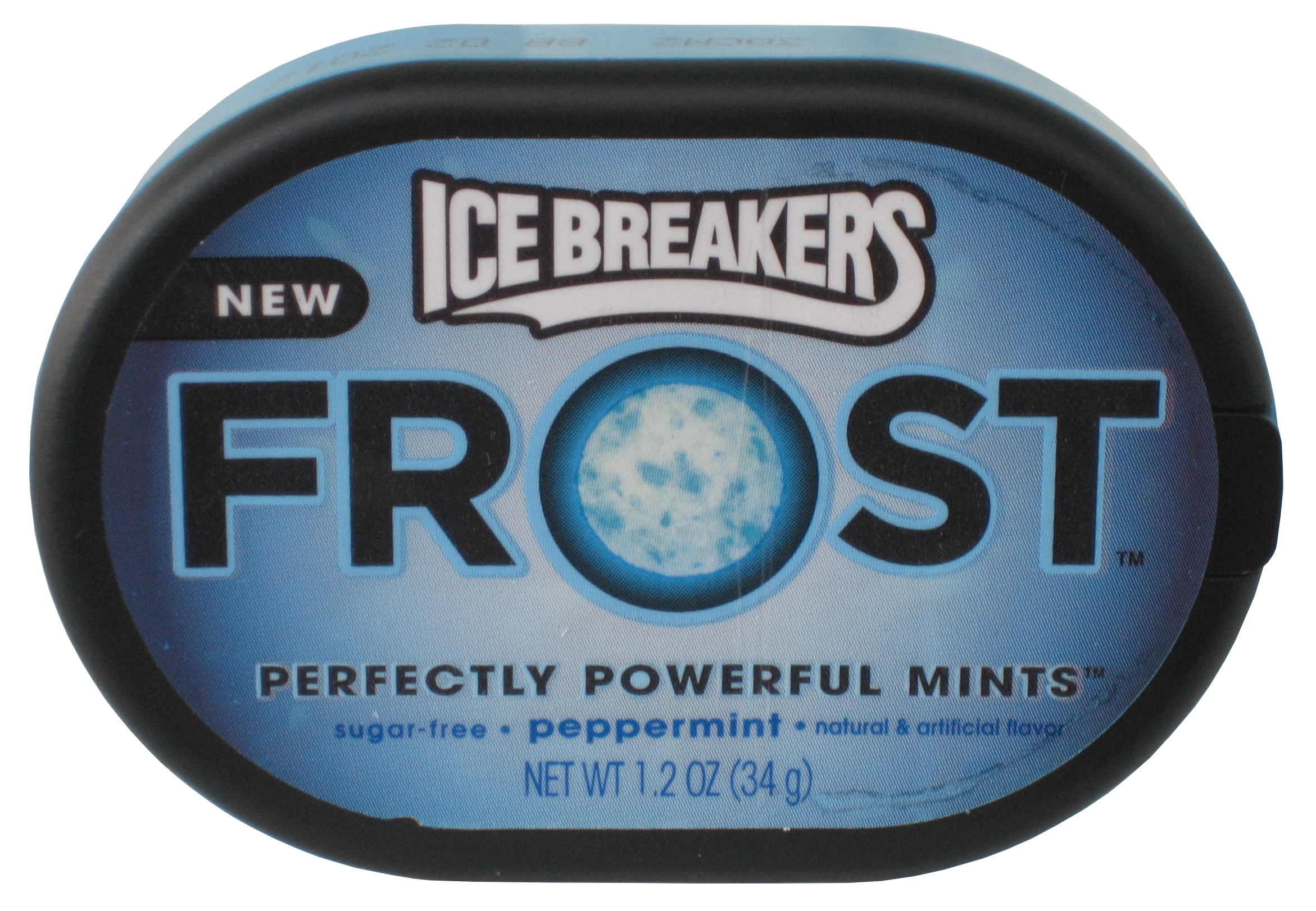
- Sugar-free peppermint candies
- Product type: Chewing gum; Mint; Candy
- Current owner: Hershey Company (2000–)
- Produced by: Hershey Company
- Country: United States
- Related brands: Breath Savers; Bubble Yum; List of products manufactured by The Hershey Company
- Markets: Worldwide
- Previous owners: Nabisco (1996–2000)
- Tagline: KEEP COOL. STAY FRESH.; Break the ice.; Experience a flavor breakthrough.; Ooooh, Fancy!
- Website: ice-breakers

Ice Breakers is a brand of mints and chewing gum owned by The Hershey Company.

Its line of soft, cube-shaped gum is branded as Ice Cubes.

== History ==
Ice Breakers was launched in the 1990s by Nabisco Holding's LifeSaver division in order to compete with similar mint brands. Hershey purchased Ice Breakers from Nabisco in 2000 for $135 million in a deal that also included mint and chewing gum brands like Bubble Yum, Breath Savers, CareFree and Stickfree. Ice Breakers began showing growth following the acquisition by Hershey.

In 2006, it was reported that Hershey had the third largest share of the chewing-gum market and it viewed Ice Breakers as a means of expanding its share. As of 2014, it was reported that overall chewing-gum sales were in decline. It was thought by some economy experts to be due to the economy at the time and a larger variety of choices outside of chewing gum. In 2016, it was reported that Ice Breaker's sales of its Ice Cubes product had increased from 2015.

=== Products and promotions ===
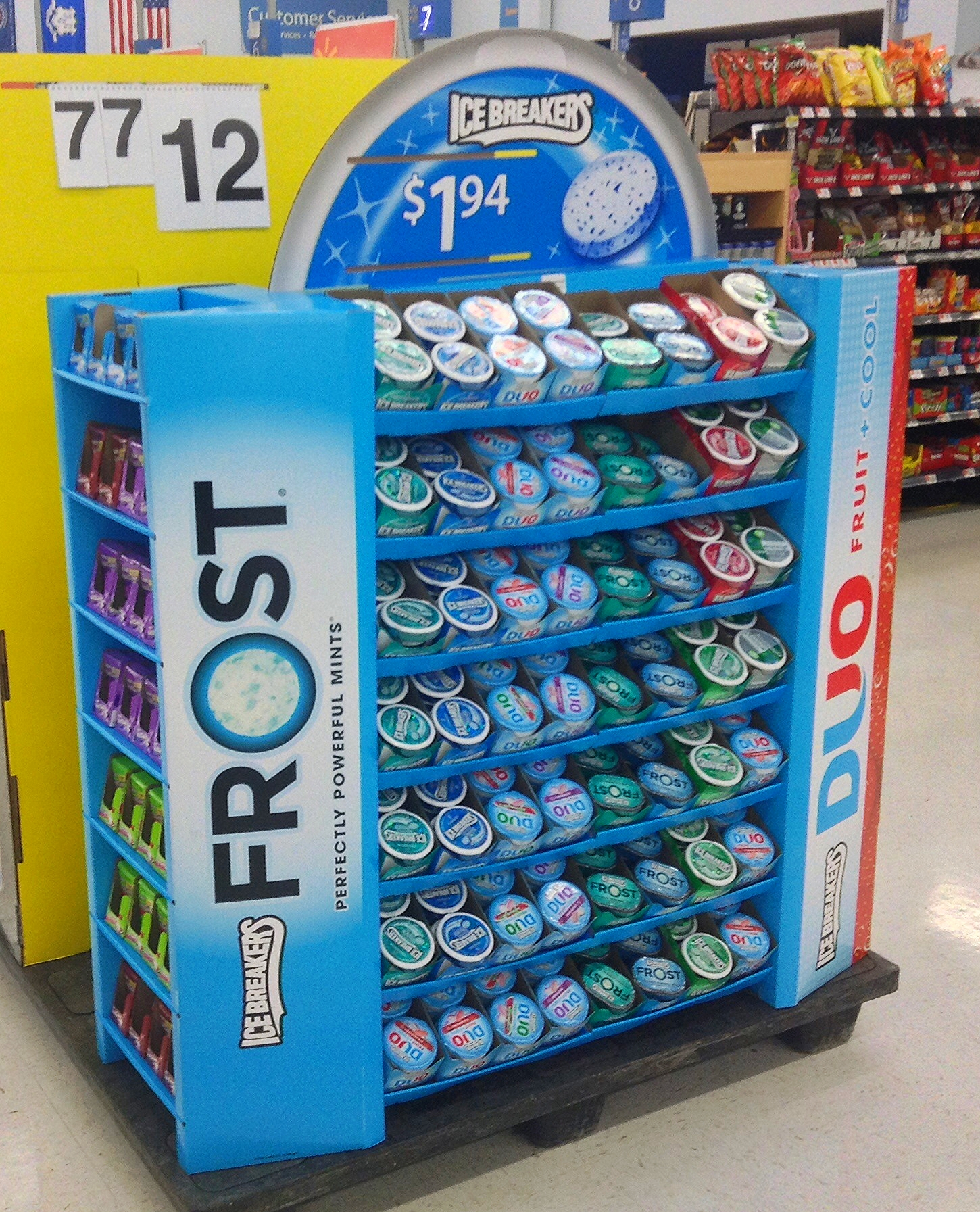
Ice Breakers endcap display showing mints and chewing gum

Ice Breakers manufactures and sells mint and chewing gum products including cool mints, peppermint chews and soft, cube-shaped gum branded as Ice Cubes. In 2003, Ice Breakers launched Liquid Ice, a liquid filled mint. An advertising and PR campaign that centered around Jessica Simpson was also launched to promote the product. In 2004, the company released its dual-pack gum and mints. Later that year, Ice Breakers signed Hilary and Haylie Duff as the brand's spokeswomen.

In April 2018, Ice Breakers launched an edible glitter-sprinkled gum that they hoped would appeal to Millennials.

The company has also sponsored athletes including NASCAR driver Kevin Harvick and the U.S. Ski and Snowboard Association (USSA).

Ice Breakers Frost mints were discontinued in September 2022.

== Product controversy ==
In 2007, Hershey released Ice Breakers PACS, wherein a powdery mint mixture was encased by two blue dissolving layers. It received national attention for its resemblance to street narcotics. Hershey denied the resemblance but pulled the product out of the market shortly thereafter.

Ice Breakers gum was banned in the Kuwaiti market due to containing pig gelatin.

== Health Pros and Cons ==
Some benefits claimed for eating Ice Breakers Ice Product Ice Cubes are calorie reduction in diets, improvement in dental health, and control in blood sugar levels. On the other hand, a poorly-substantiated study has claimed that ingredients in Ice Cubes like Aspartame and Sucralose actually increase consumers' chance of developing some form of cancer.
