= Győri Keksz =

Hungarian food company

Győri is a brand name for biscuit products and candies owned by the Győri Keksz Ltd., Hungary. Győri Keksz Ltd. is owned by Mondelez International. In its early years the production took place in Győr with the help of only 50 professionals. In its most successful years, however, the company employed around 1000 (later even 2000) people and offered 334 different goods.

== History ==
The predecessor of the company was established from Hermann Bach's steam mill in Győrsziget and became the first biscuit factory of Hungary, in 1880. In 1892, however, Lajos Koestlin bought the factory. Koestlin had already had a biscuit factory in Bregenz, Austria but the competition was so stiff there that he moved to Hungary and brought all his equipment for biscuit-production with him in 6 stock-cars. He also invited 50 professionals and restarted work in the new country in 1900. The products of his factory included biscuits, rusk, ‘cvibak’ (rusk for the army), wafers and gingerbread. The company became successful, before the outbreak of the First World War it already employed about 1000 workers. As the fights started and the needs of the citizens of Hungary and of the army increased rapidly, the company fulfilled a rising number of orders – the products of the Koestlin factory were demanded all over the Austro-Hungarian Monarchy and the factory in Győr became the acropolis of Hungarian biscuit-production.

After the First World War the production was cut down because of the lack of ingredients, and the number of employees was reduced to around 500. To balance the situation, the factory started producing chocolates and bonbons in 1922 and candies in 1925. By 1926 the company was exporting to 14 countries, and in the 1930s it had 334 different kinds of products.

In 1931 the company was reformed as a Public Limited Company and in spite of the effects of the Great Depression, it retained its variety of products. Under the German occupation, however, it was declared a factory for war efforts and restarted the production of only biscuits, wafers and rusk. In 1945 the factory again had to suffer from the lack of money and ingredients, so the production was suspended for 4 months after which the factory was ordered by the mayor of Győr to serve the public demands. The production halls were even let to the coalition of the Hungarian Commercial Bank of Pest and the Leipziger Vilmos Szesz és Cukorgyár (Liquor and Sugar Factory of Vilmos Leipziger). Although being nationalised in 1947, the factory was declared to be independent again in 1948 by the Minister of Agriculture of the time, and in 1950 the factory was reformed for the third time as the Győri Keksz és Ostyagyár Nemzeti Vállalat (National Company of Biscuit and Wafer Factory of Győr). In 1963 the status of the factory changed again, since all the 6 confectionery factories of the country were converted into a general one, namely the Magyar Édesipari Vállalat (Hungarian Confectionery Company).

In the 1980s the factory was modernised several times and after the change of regime, the Győri Keksz és Ostyagyár (Biscuit and Wafer Factory of Győr) was privatised by the British company, the United Biscuits in 1991 and was registered under the name Győri Keksz Ltd. Between the late 1990s and the early years of the new century several important changes came into force: the headquarters of the company was shifted from Győr to Budaörs in 1997, the French Danone bought the company from the United Biscuits in 2000 and in 2007 the Danone division together with the Győri Keksz Ltd. was bought by the Kraft Foods. The headquarters of the company is presently in Székesfehérvár but production does not take place within the borders of Hungary any more.

== Product history ==
At the very beginning of the history of the factory (in the times of Lajos Koestlin) produced biscuits, rusk, ‘cvibak’ (rusk for the army), wafers and gingerbread. In addition to these, in 1912, the company bought the licence of the Albert keksz (Albert biscuit – probably named after the husband of Queen Victoria) from the British T&T Vicars Company. In 1922 this repertoire was broadened with chocolates, bonbons and candies in 1922 and in 1925 respectively. Besides these, by 1926 jellies were included in the offer. In 1963, the production of the chocolate figures, bonbons, Christmas candies (szaloncukor), jellies, chewing gums, drops and rusks was suspended but in return, the factory got the right from other factories to produce gingerbread, wafers and babapiskóta (a kind of sweet sponge-cake). In 1968, after the factory was enlarged by another division, the production of baking powder, vanilla-sugar, custard-powder and tea-flavourings could start. In 1976 due to a licence contract with the Dr. Oetker, the supply was broadened again. Moreover, in 1980 the Győri Keksz received the licence of the Negro, a kind of candy known as the ‘chimney-sweep of the throat.’ Its original flavour was anise-menthol but today it is produced in various flavours; for instance, honey, eucalyptus and cherry-menthol. After forming a joint venture with the HAAS Company (Linz, Austria), the factory, under the name Hungarocandy Kft., started the production of the PEZ candies (a kind of pressed candy)
