= Polo (confectionery) =

Mint confectionery

Polo Mints

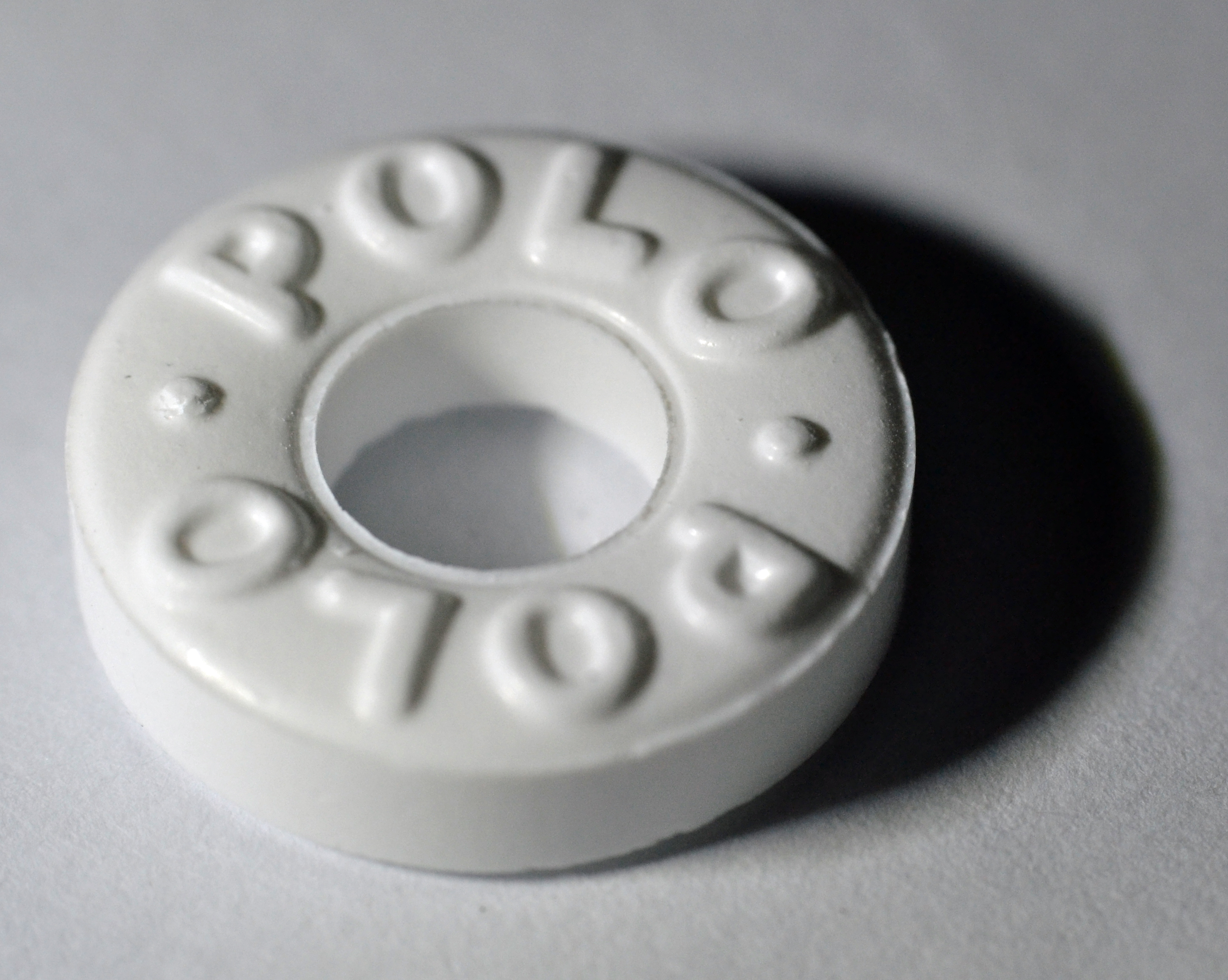
- Product type: Breath mint
- Current owner: Nestlé
- Country: United Kingdom
- Introduced: 1948; 78 years ago
- Markets: EMEA; Southeast Asia; South Asia
- Previous owners: Rowntree's
- Tagline: "The mint with the hole"
- Website: www.nestle-confectionery.co.uk/brands/polo

Polo is a brand of breath mint whose defining feature is the hole in the middle. The peppermint flavoured Polo was developed by George Harris and first manufactured in the United Kingdom in 1948 at the Rowntree's Factory, York, and a range of flavours followed. Polo mints are sold by Nestlé, usually in a 34-gram (1.2 oz) pack containing 23 mints.

== History ==
Polo mints were developed by Rowntree's, after their war-time licence to manufacture Life Savers expired. Polo fruits followed soon afterwards. Company legend is that the name is derived from 'polar' and its implied cool freshness.

== Varieties ==
Rowntree's and Nestlé have come up with variations of the original Polo mint. Some of these have been successes, whereas others have failed. None has been as successful as the original Polo mint.

- Spearmint: "Cool look, cool taste." These Polos have a strong spearmint flavour and aroma. The original design of the sweets had turquoise flecks on them, and were mildly triboluminescent, but now are white.
- Fruit: These are boiled sweets in several fruit flavours, all in one tube. Flavours include strawberry, blackcurrant, orange, lemon, and lime.
- Polo Gummies: Fruit flavoured soft gummy sweets in the Polo shape.
- Sugar free: Sugar free version of the original Polo containing sorbitol.
- Mini Polos: Small Polos (about 0.5 cm in diameter) with a strong "Super Mint" minty flavour. They were packaged in a box shaped like a Polo Mint. They were also available in an Orange flavour.
- Smoothies: These creamy sweets came in flavours such as blackcurrant, sunshine fruits and strawberry.
- Citrus Sharp: Lemon and lime flavoured. Discontinued in the United Kingdom.
- Butter Mint Polos: mint flavour butterscotch.
- Strong/Extra Strong: "We like them strong, but silent." A rival for Trebor, these were very hot. Discontinued in the United Kingdom.
- Ice: These came in a shiny blue wrapper, and had a cooler mint taste.
- Paan flavoured currently available in India since 2020
- Mint O Fruit: (available in Indonesia). These come in the following flavours: Raspberry Mint, Blackcurrant Mint, Peppermint, Lime Mint and Cherry Mint. These Polos come with the following slogan "Think Plong! Masih Ada Bolong!" These are also sold in the United Kingdom in some Poundland stores.
- Holes: These were a plastic tube of small mints approximately, but not exactly, the size of the hole in a standard Polo mint.

Before this, Rowntree had already experimented with different Polos in the 1980s. Polo Fruits were always available, but they briefly made:

- Lemon: Similar to the citrus flavour that Nestlé put out around ten years later, but not identical.
- Orange: similar to Lemon, but in an orange packet.
- Tropical Fruit: included Banana, Melon, Coconut and others
- Globes: small capsules filled with mint flavoured liquid in a small box with a flip lid

== Description ==
A Polo is approximately 19 millimetres (0.75 in) in diameter and 4 millimetres (0.16 in) thick, with a 8-millimetre (0.31 in)-wide hole. The original Polo is white in colour with a hole in the middle, and the word 'POLO' embossed twice on one flat side of the ring, hence the popular slogan The Mint with the Hole. Ingredients of the main variety include sugar, glucose syrup, modified starch, stearic acid (of vegetable origin) and mint oils.

== Packaging ==
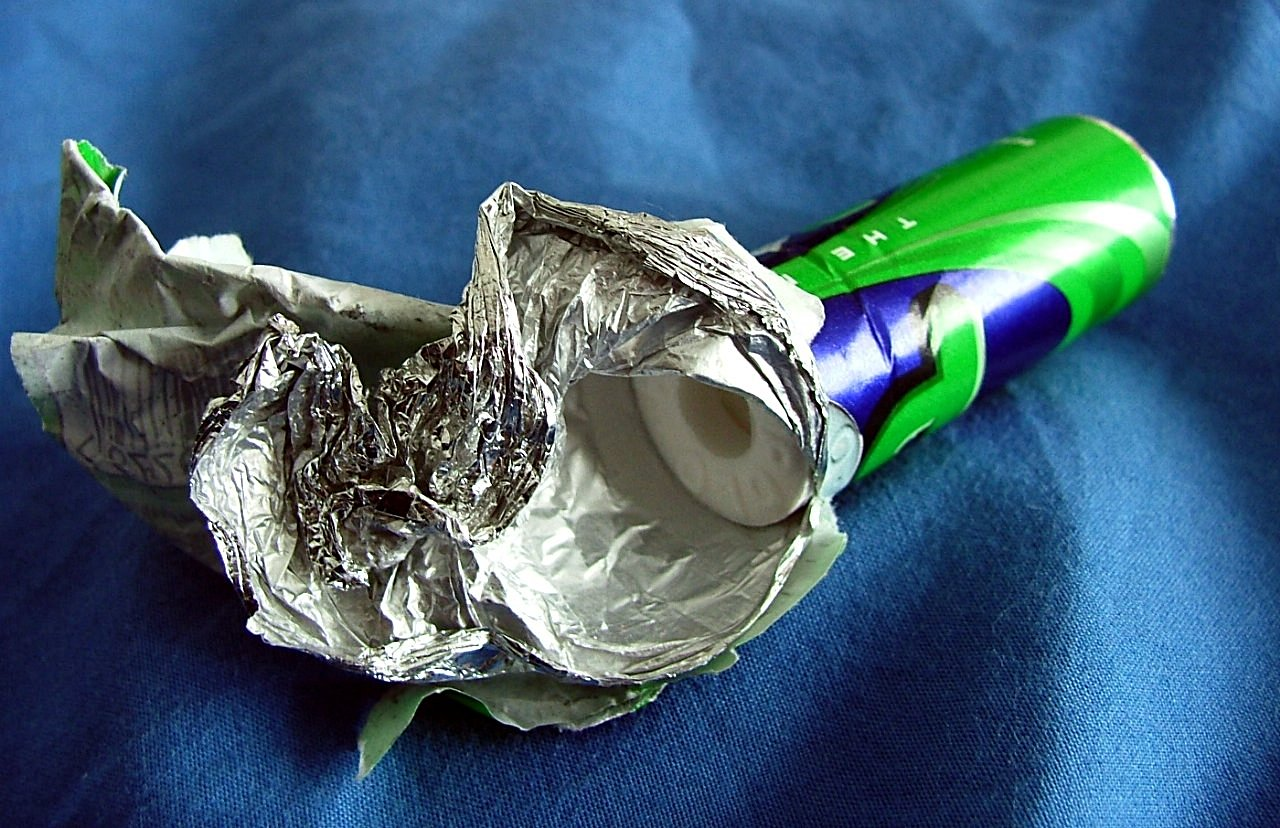
An open packet of Polo mints

Polos are usually sold in individual packs of 23 mints, which measure about 10 centimetres (3.9 in) tall. The tube of Polos is tightly wrapped with aluminium foil backed paper. A green and blue paper wrapper, with the word 'POLO', binds the foil wrapper, with the Os in 'Polo' represented by images of the sweet. For the spearmint flavour, the paper wrapper is turquoise in colour, and the Extra Strong flavour is in a black paper wrapper.

== Trademarks ==
When the Trade Marks Act 1994 was introduced in the United Kingdom, Nestlé applied to register the shape of the Polo mint. The application featured a white, annular mint without any lettering. This application was opposed by Kraft Foods, owner of Life Savers, and Mars UK, because of the lack of distinctive character of the mint.

Nestlé's application was allowed to proceed if it agreed to narrow the description of the mint i.e. the dimensions of the mint were limited to the standard dimensions of the Polo mint and that it was limited to "mint flavoured compressed confectionery".

Kraft Foods made a similar applications for annular sweets e.g. bearing the mark LIFESAVERS. Nestlé has tried to oppose this trademark application but failed as the court ruled that customers would be able to distinguish between a Polo and a Lifesaver as both have their marks boldly and prominently embossed on the mint.

== Advertising ==
During the 1980s, Peter Sallis provided the voiceover for television advertisements. With the launch of the spearmint variety, a new television campaign featured a voiceover by Danny John-Jules, using a voice similar to the one he employed as the Cat on Red Dwarf.

In 1995, the company launched an advertising campaign produced by Aardman Animations, which showed animated Polos on a factory production line. In one, a scared Polo without a hole attempts to escape, but is restrained by the hole punching machinery. Polo experimented with other forms of advertising in the end of the 1990s. In 1998, they collaborated with PolyGram for a compilation album, Cool Grooves, which reached No. 12 in the UK Compilation Chart on 5 September that year.

== Association with horses ==
Horses enjoy the taste of peppermint. As such peppermint sweets, including polo mints are given to horses as treats. At the launch event of author Jilly Cooper's 2016 novel Mount! guests were provided with polo mints to give to a white stallion who was present as treats.

== See also ==
- List of breath mints
