= Negro (candy) =

Brand of hard candy

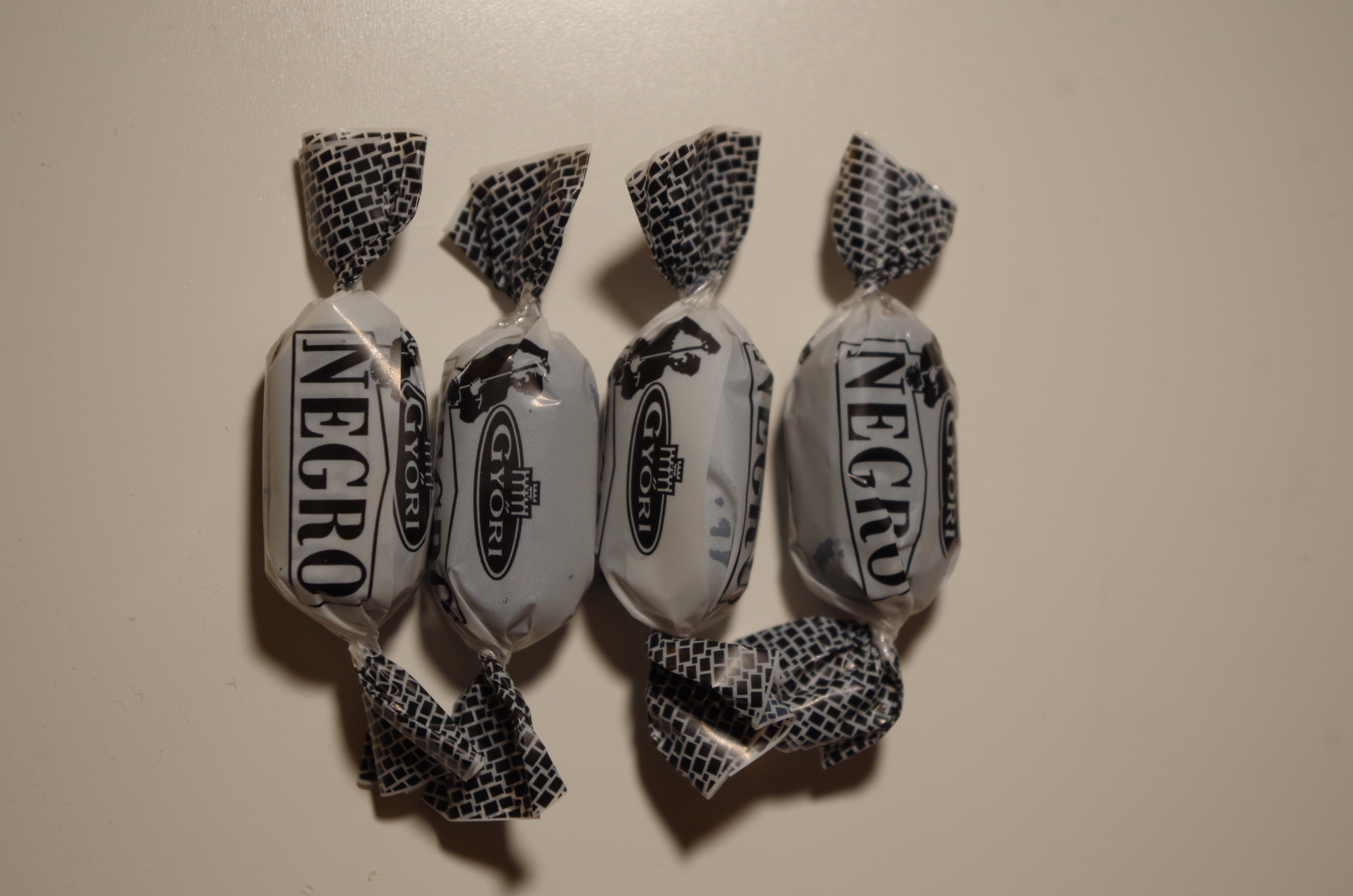
- Type: Sweets
- Founder: József Ruff
- Headquarters: Hungary; Serbia
- Website: http://www.negro.hu/ https://a-pionir.com/en/hard-candies/

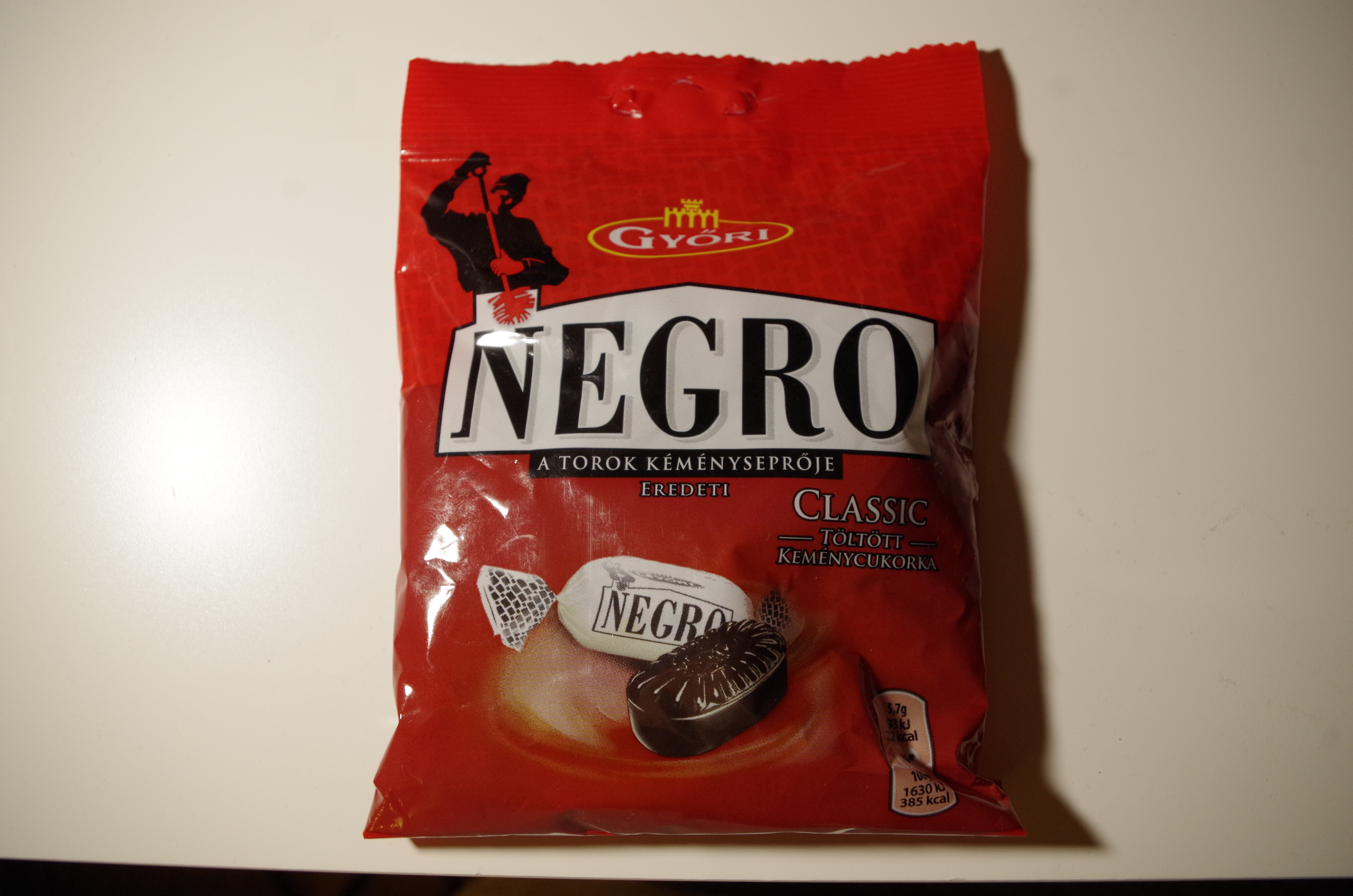
Hungarian Negro

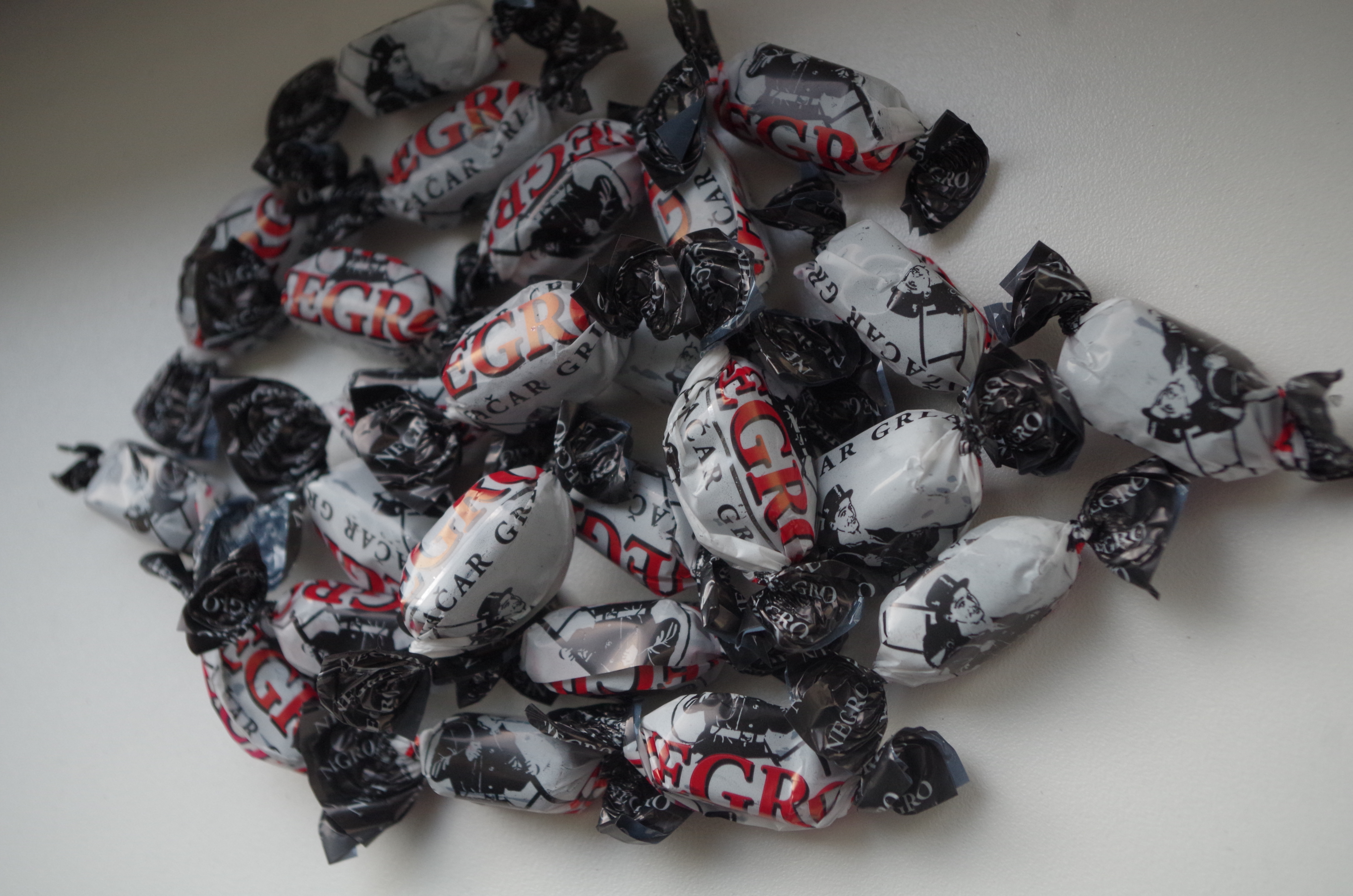
Serbian Negro candies

Negro is a hard candy brand known for its distinctive black colour and strong menthol-herbal flavour. It has long been marketed as “the chimney sweep of the throat”, reflecting its reputation as a soothing throat candy. It is one of Hungary's best-known confectionery products and has been sold for over a century, it originates from Szabadka, Kingdom of Hungary (now Subotica, Serbia), made by the company founded in 1917 by Hungarian confectionery manufacturer and entrepreneur József Ruff (1895–1979). Originally based in Austria-Hungary, Ruff and his family continued living and working in the Kingdom of Yugoslavia following the dissolution of Austria-Hungary. This brand of candies has been later produced by Pionir (the successor of Ruff's confectionery production) since 1946 in Serbia. In Hungary, it was produced by Győri Keksz until 2019. The product's slogan is "the chimney sweeper of the throat". On its wrapper a chimney sweeper is depicted sweeping a chimney. It gets its black colour, from which the candy's name is derived, from active carbon. Anise, which is similar in taste to licorice, and taste from menthol is added. Its full recipe is an industrial secret.
