= Altoids =

Brand of breath mints

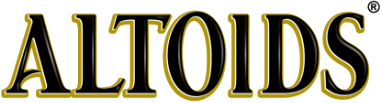

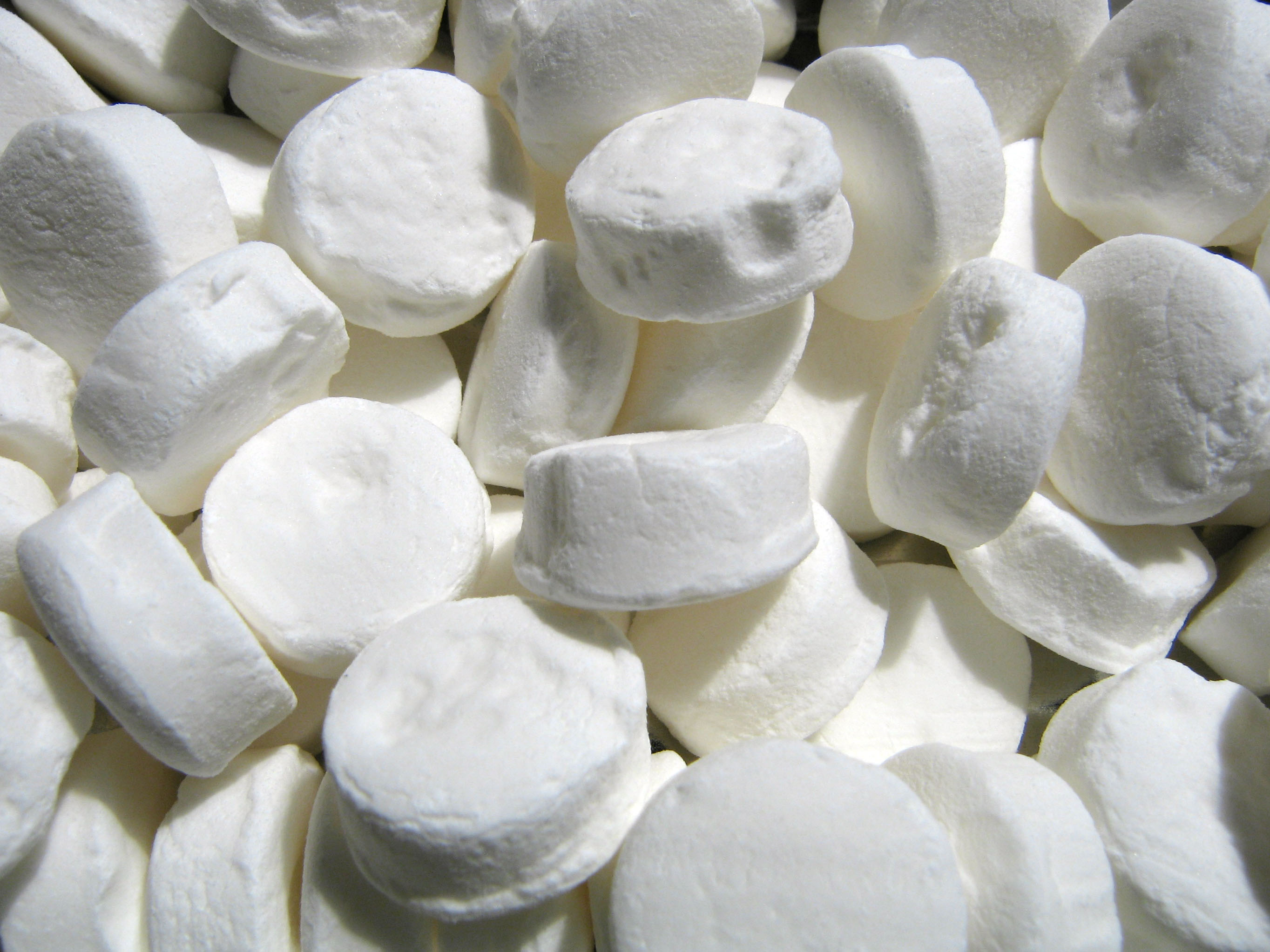
- Product type: Mint
- Current owner: Mars, Inc.
- Produced by: Wrigley Company
- Introduced: 1780; 246 years ago
- Previous owners: Callard & Bowser
- Website: altoids.com

Altoids
- Invented: 1780; 246 years ago
- Main ingredients: Sugar or sorbitol
- Ingredients generally used: Natural and/or artificial flavours
- Variations: 406
- Food energy (per 3 pieces (2g) serving): 10 kcal (42 kJ)
Nutritional value
(per 3 pieces (2g) serving)
- Protein: 0 g
- Fat: 0 g
- Carbohydrate: 2 g
- Other information: Owner: Mars Wrigley

Altoids are a brand of mints, sold primarily in distinctive metal tins. The brand was created by the London-based Smith & Company in the 1780s, and became part of the Callard & Bowser company in the 19th century. Their advertising slogan is "The Original Celebrated Curiously Strong Mints", referring to the high concentration of peppermint oil used in the original flavour lozenge. The mints were originally conceived as a lozenge intended to relieve intestinal discomfort.

== Marketing ==
Callard & Bowser-Suchard once manufactured Altoids at a plant in Bridgend, Wales, but has since moved production to a Mars Wrigley plant in Chattanooga, Tennessee, United States, in order to manufacture the products closer to where they are primarily marketed. They were marketed for a brief period in the 1990s under the "Nuttall's" brand when Callard and Bowser was under the ownership of Terry's.

== Flavours and varieties ==
=== Mints ===
As of June 2022, Altoids mints are available in five flavours, namely peppermint, wintergreen, spearmint, cinnamon, and strawberry. "Sugar-Free Smalls", tiny square mints sweetened with sorbitol and sucralose, are also available in peppermint, wintergreen, and cinnamon. In 2007, dark chocolate-dipped mints were introduced in three flavours, namely peppermint, cinnamon, and ginger and in 2008, dark chocolate-dipped mints were introduced in crème de menthe. The chocolate-dipped varieties were discontinued in 2010. Also historically made, but no longer available, were liquorice, cool honey, and (non-chocolate dipped) ginger and crème de menthe varieties. Circa early 2011, Altoids altered the ingredients of their wintergreen mints, adding blue food colouring. Altoid mints other than those labelled "sugar-free smalls" contain gelatin.

=== Sours ===
Sour hard candies in round tins were introduced in 2001 but were discontinued in 2010 due to low sales. Flavours included raspberry, citrus, apple, tangerine, and mango. Limited edition passion fruit sours were also released around Valentine's Day in 2005 in a larger 2.3 oz (65 g) tin instead of the standard 1.76 oz (50 g) sour tins that had been released up until then.

=== Gum ===
The sugar-free chewing gum, introduced in 2003, was made in the United States. Flavours include peppermint, cinnamon, spearmint, wintergreen, and two sour flavours, cherry, and apple. The gum has not been seen in stock in US stores since January 2010 and has been discontinued.

=== Altoids Strips ===
In 2003, breath strips in peppermint and cinnamon flavors were introduced. They were discontinued.

=== Altoids Arctic ===
In 2014, Eclipse Mints, another Wrigley product, was rebranded as Altoids Arctic, with the tin remaining identical save for labelling. The rebranded mints were released in only peppermint, wintergreen, and strawberry, doing away with the wider varieties of Eclipse, such as cinnamon, winterfrost, and several other flavours, as well as the chewable format. As before, each tin contains 1.2 oz (34 g), or about 50 mints.

== Tins ==
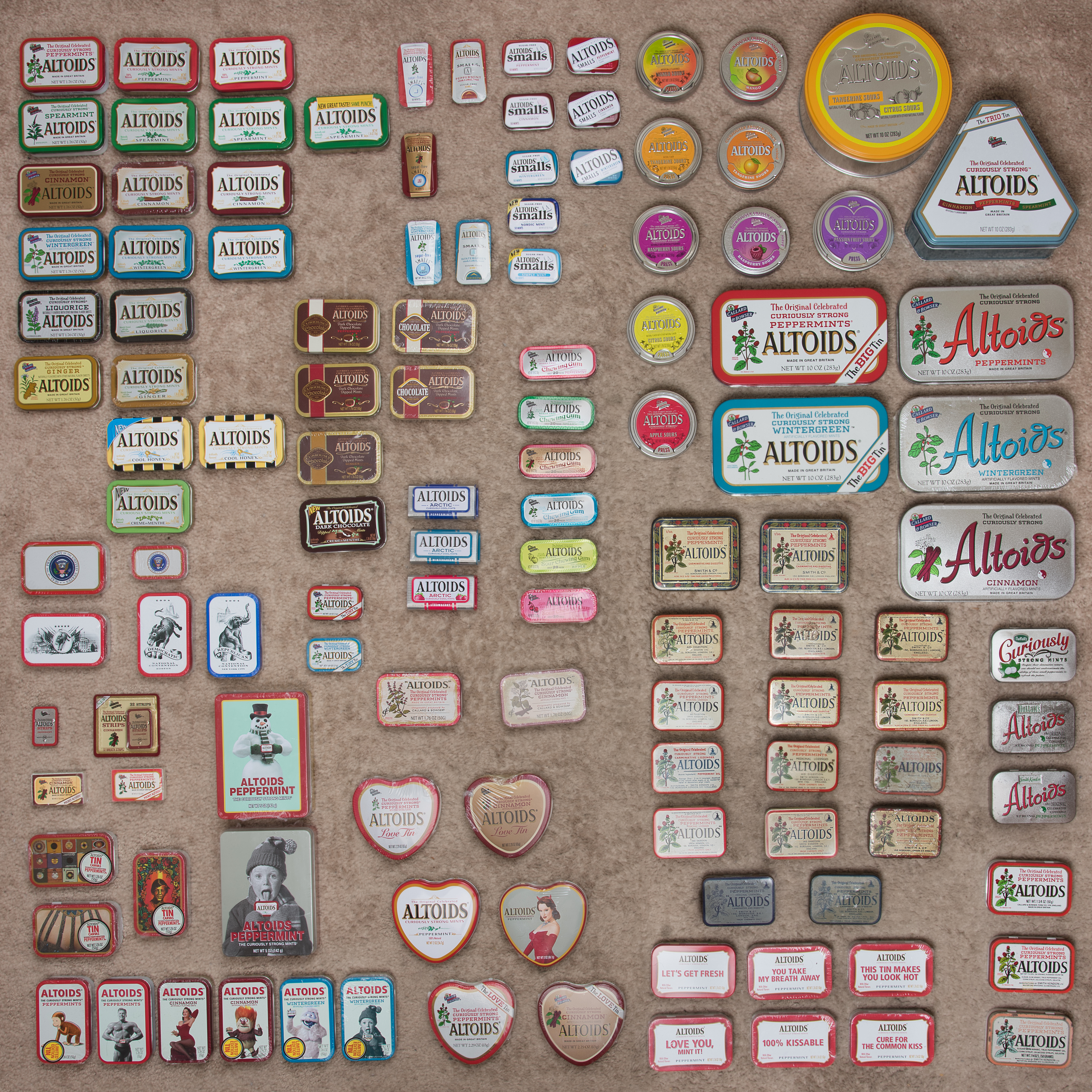
A collection of Altoids tins

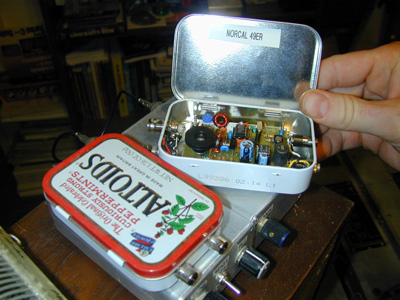
An Altoids tin used to house an amateur QRP rig

The distinctive tins in which Altoids mints are packaged are often reused for other purposes. They have long been used as containers for household items like paper clips, coins, sewing materials, and other small items. Many people make "Altoids Wallets" out of the tins, decorating the interior to add personalization. Tins have also been used as an art medium; Colorado-based painter Remington Robinson paints miniature plein-air scenes inside the lids of tins.

Altoids tins are popular with outdoor enthusiasts for many years as first-aid or mini survival kit containers. A name for these kits is Bug-Out Altoids Tins, or BOATs.

The tins are sometimes used to house electronics projects. BeagleBone, a single-board computer made by Texas Instruments, is deliberately shaped with rounded corners to fit inside the tin.

A retrocomputing hobbyist computer, the Membership Card is a series of 1802/8080/Z80 based microcomputer kits, designed to fit in an Altoids tin, and CMoy pocket headphone amplifiers often use the containers as an enclosure.

The mintyPi is a kit that uses an Altoids tin to house a portable retro gaming machine.

== Altoids Award ==
At the grand opening of The New Museum of Contemporary Art in 2007, Altoids announced the biennial Altoids Award, in which cash prizes of $25,000 are awarded to four artists from around the US. Winners have their art exhibited at the museum after the rigorous selection process is completed. The first winners were chosen by Paul McCarthy, Cindy Sherman, and Rirkrit Tiravanija.

== See also ==
- Fisherman's Friend
- List of breath mints
- Victory V
- Vigroids
