= Mint (candy) =

Confectionery flavoured with mint

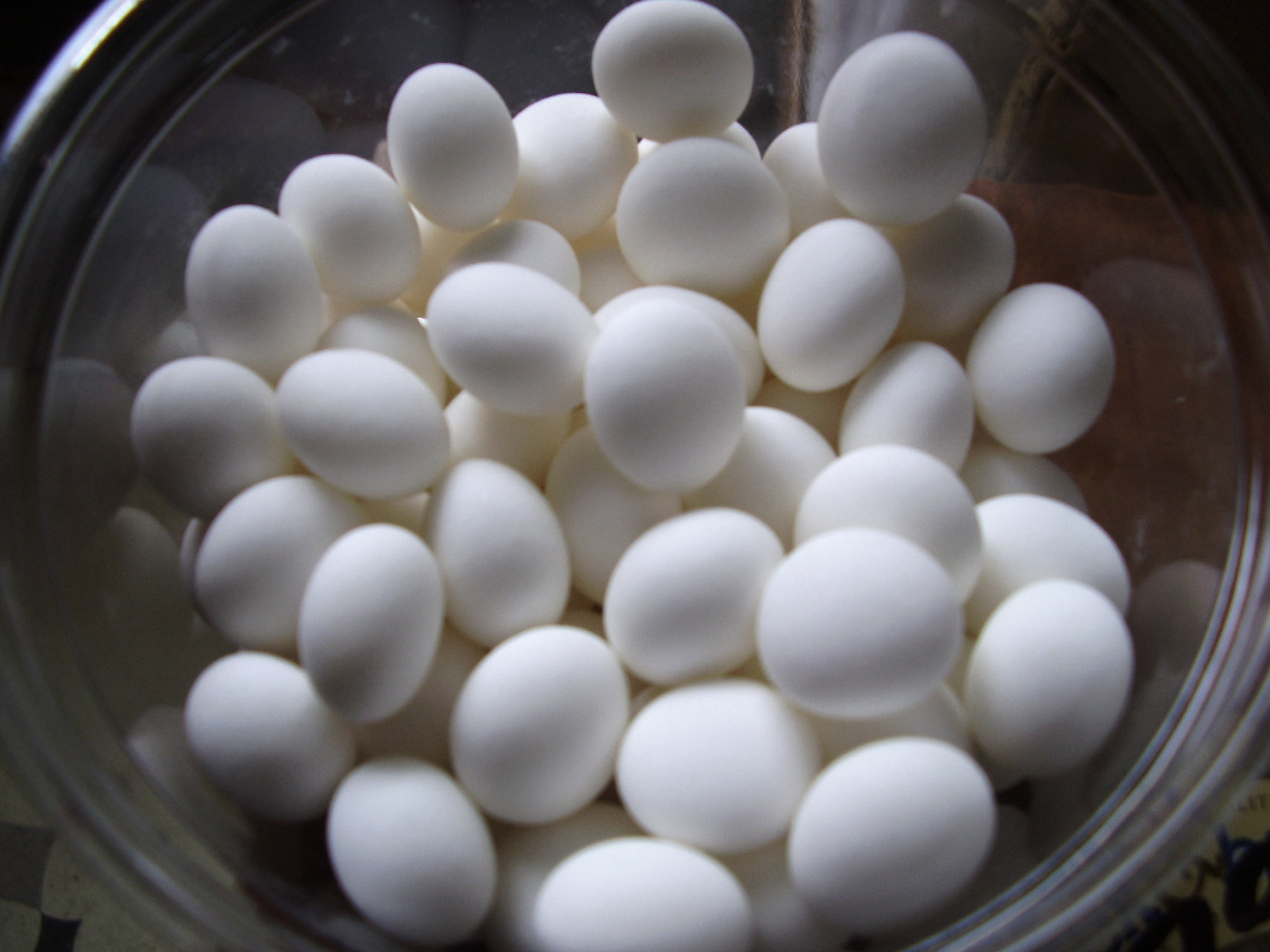
- Scotch mints
- Alternative names: Peppermints, spearmints
- Type: Confectionery
- Main ingredients: Mint flavoring or mint oil or other oil (such as wintergreen)
- Variations: Hard mint, soft mints, Scotch mints, Mint Imperials

A mint or breath mint is a food item often consumed as an after-meal refreshment or before business and social engagements to improve breath odor. Mints are commonly believed to soothe the stomach, given their association with natural byproducts of the plant genus Mentha. Mints sometimes contain derivatives from plants such as peppermint oil or spearmint oil, or wintergreen from the plant genus Gaultheria. However, many of the most popular mints citing these natural sources contain none in their ingredient list or contain only trace amounts.

== History ==
The production of mints as a discrete food item can be traced back to the 18th century with the invention of Altoids. The popularity of mints took off in the early 20th century, with the advent of mass urbanization and mass marketing. Advertising for mints focused on their convenience, and on the socially isolating effects of bad breath; such advertisements generally targeted youth, especially younger women.

Mints have been offered in a variety of packaging, usually in an effort to promote portability. Early producers used cardboard boxes and tins, which have remained popular. More recent packaging solutions have included "rolls" containing many mints stacked in one package composed of paper or foil, plastic boxes, and individually wrapped mints. Mint sales have remained robust in the 21st century.

== Types ==
=== Hard ===
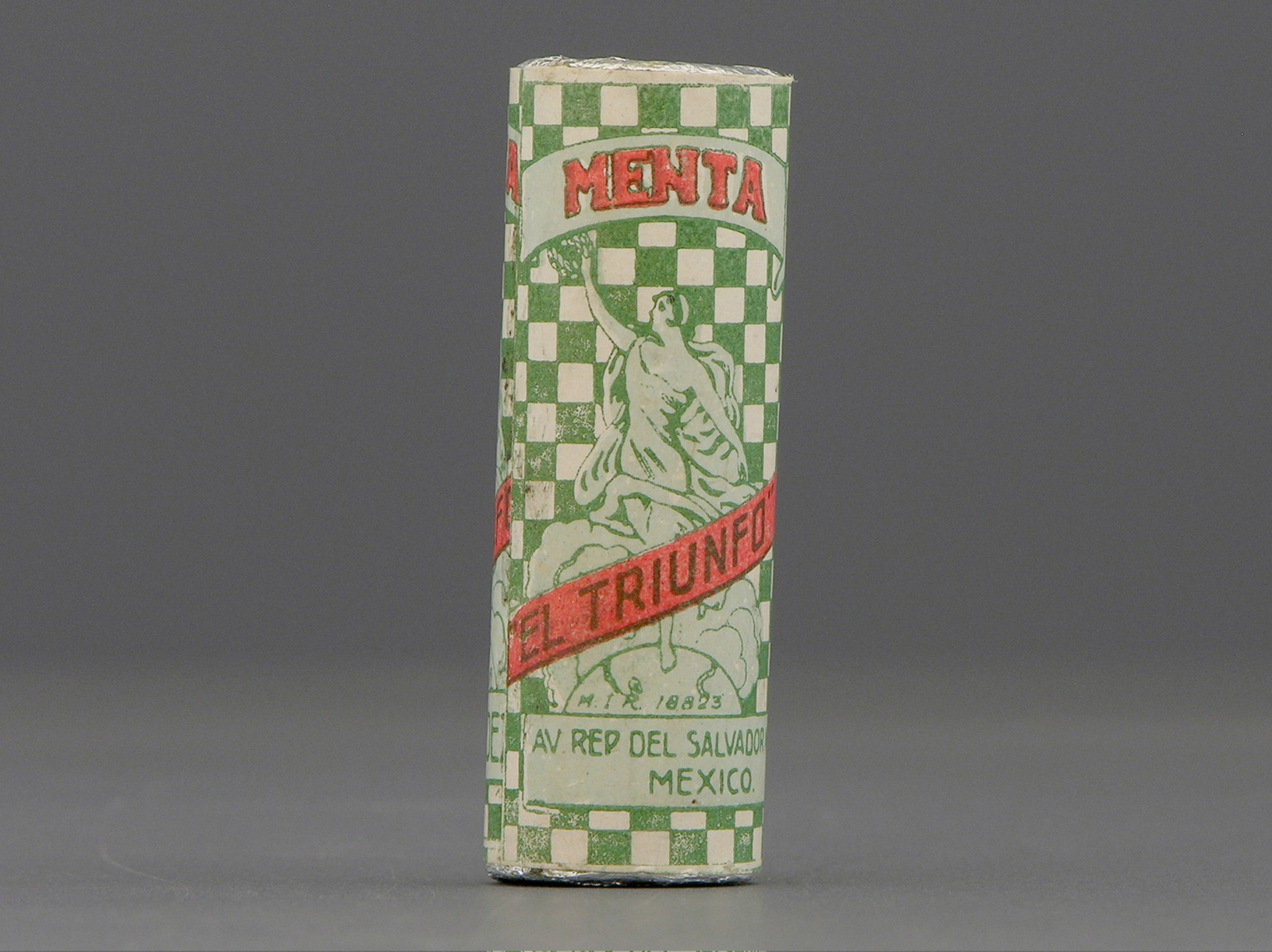
Package for mints from early 20th century Mexico from the permanent collection of the Museo del Objeto del Objeto.

Hard mints are hard candies or boiled sweets flavored with mint. Examples of hard mints include starlight mints, also known as pinwheel mints, white, circular, with red or green rays emitting from the middle; candy canes; humbugs; and brand name mints such as Altoids and Ice Breakers. Branded breath mints are produced in flavors other than mint.

=== Soft ===
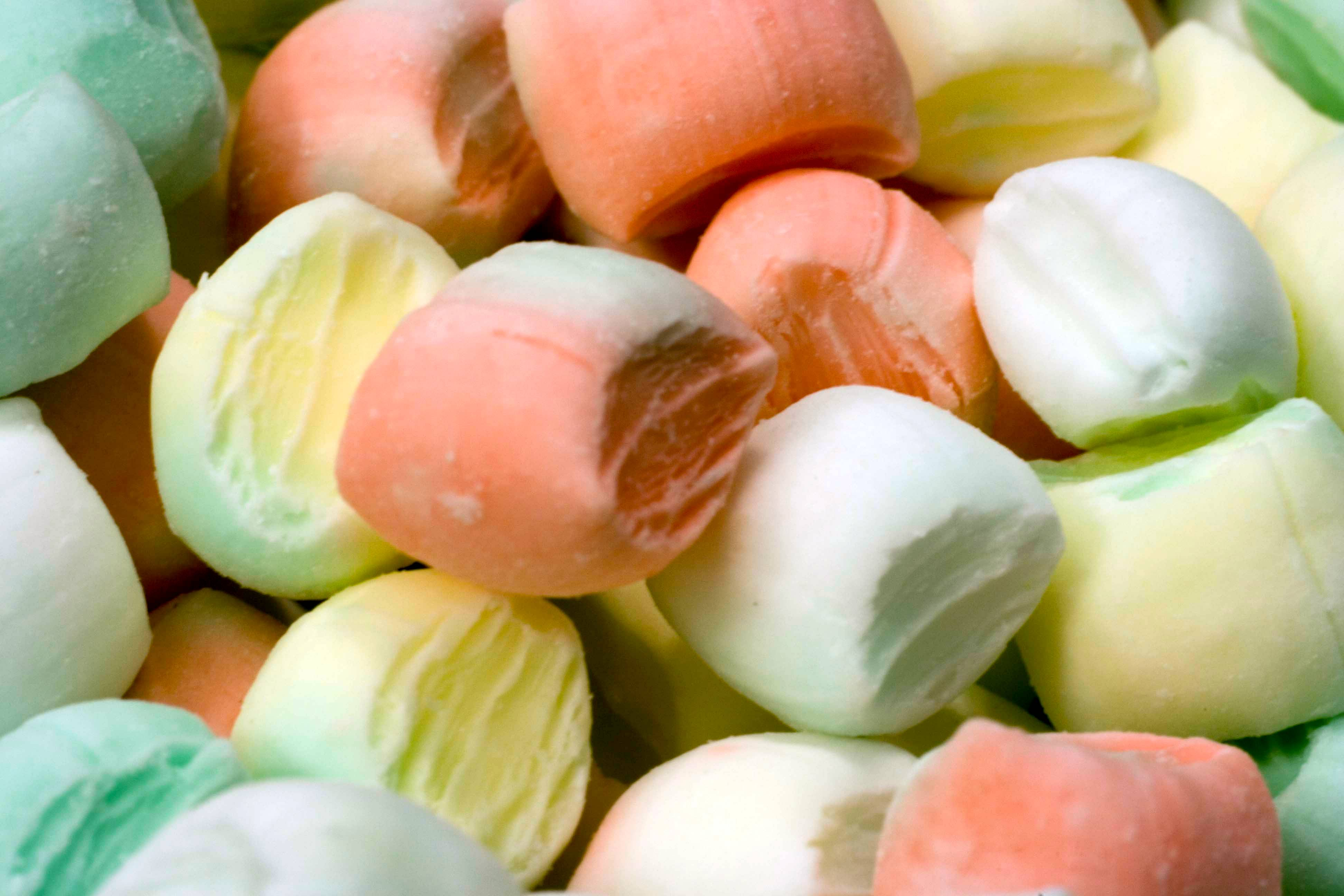
Butter mints

Soft mints, such as "dinner mints" and "butter mints", are soft candies, often with a higher butter content, that dissolve more readily inside one's mouth.

=== Scotch ===
A "scotch mint", "pan drop", "granny sooker" or "mint imperial" is a white round candy with a hard shell but fairly soft middle, popular in Great Britain and other Commonwealth nations and in Europe. Scotch mints were traditionally spheroids, more recently moving toward a larger, discoid shape. Various forms of mint may be used but those termed "scotch mints" are named for the specific mint plant Mentha × gracilis.

== Use ==
In addition to breath freshening, mints that actually contain peppermint oil or extract have been popular in helping with digestion after a meal. Peppermint has muscle relaxant properties and therefore may relax the smooth muscles of the GI tract, allowing for easier passage of food contents. However, since the lower esophageal sphincter may be relaxed, peppermint may aggravate "heartburn" or GERD.

Peppermint also seems to be effective in relieving intestinal gas and indigestion. According to the German Commission E Monograph, real peppermint oil or extract has been used for cramp-like complaints in the gastrointestinal tract. This can help to explain why mints with real peppermint oil, in addition to peppermint tea, have been popular for and are frequently used after meals to help with digestion as well as to help freshen the breath.

== Gallery ==
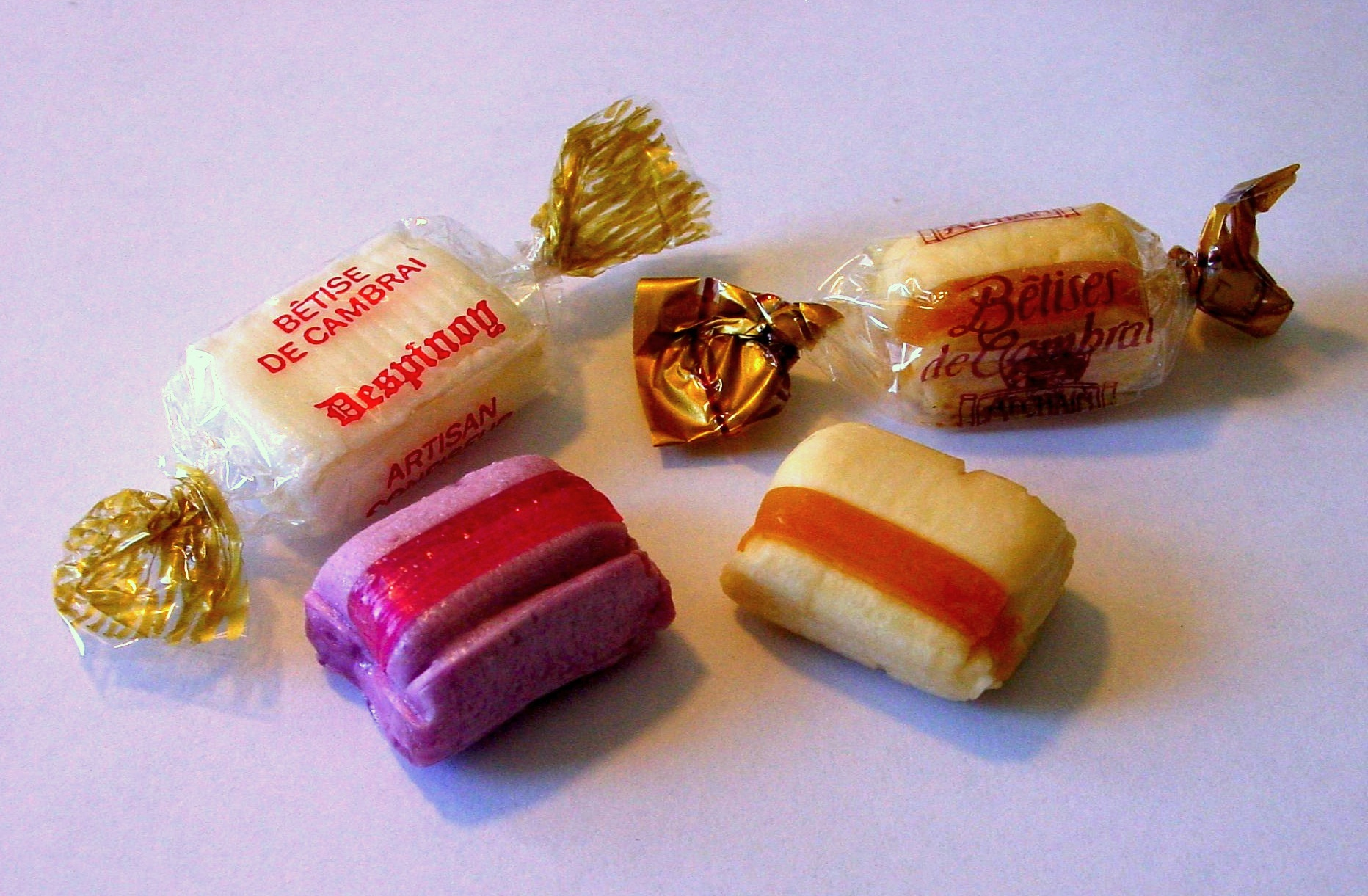
Bêtise (French for "blunder") is a mint-flavored candy made in Cambrai, France.

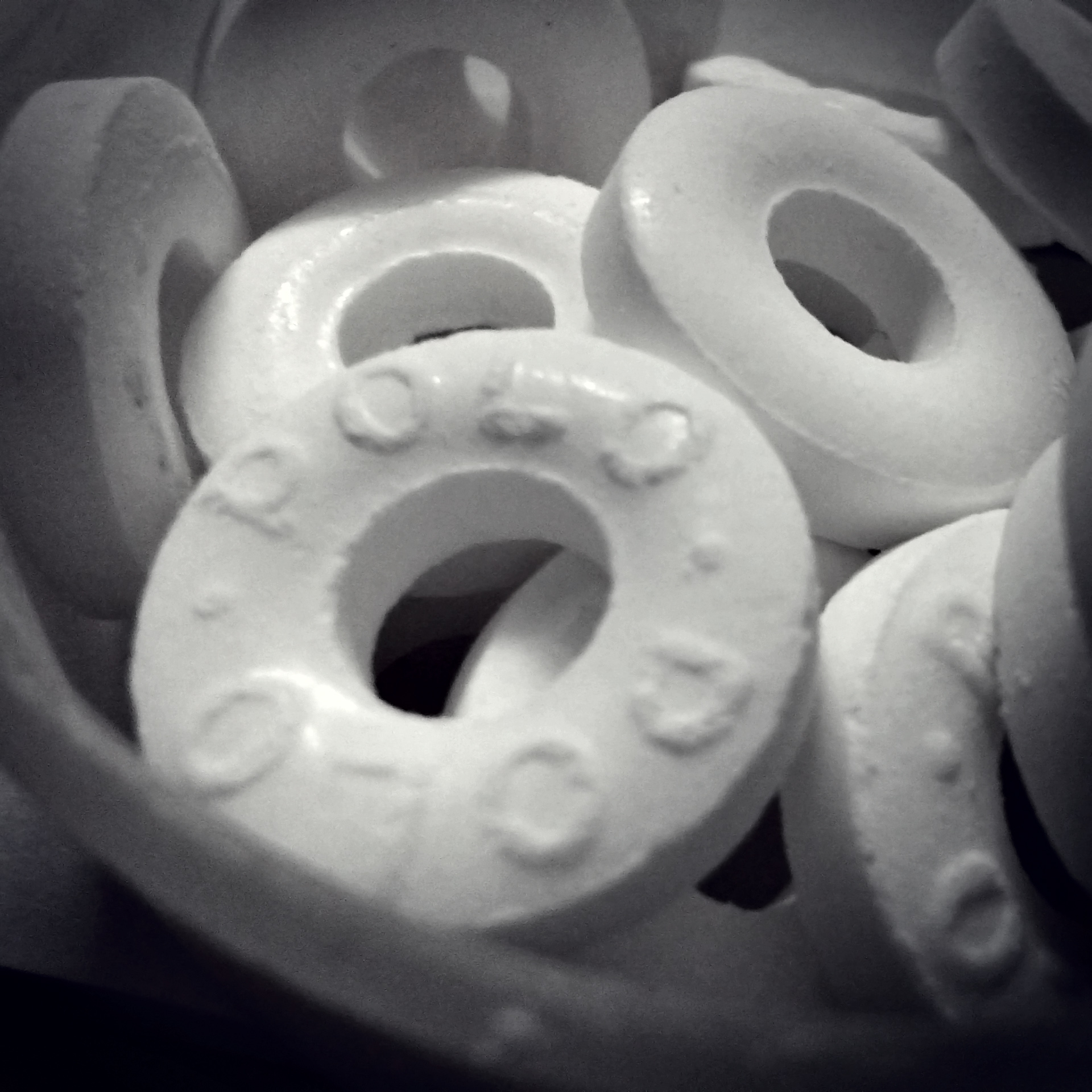
Polo mints

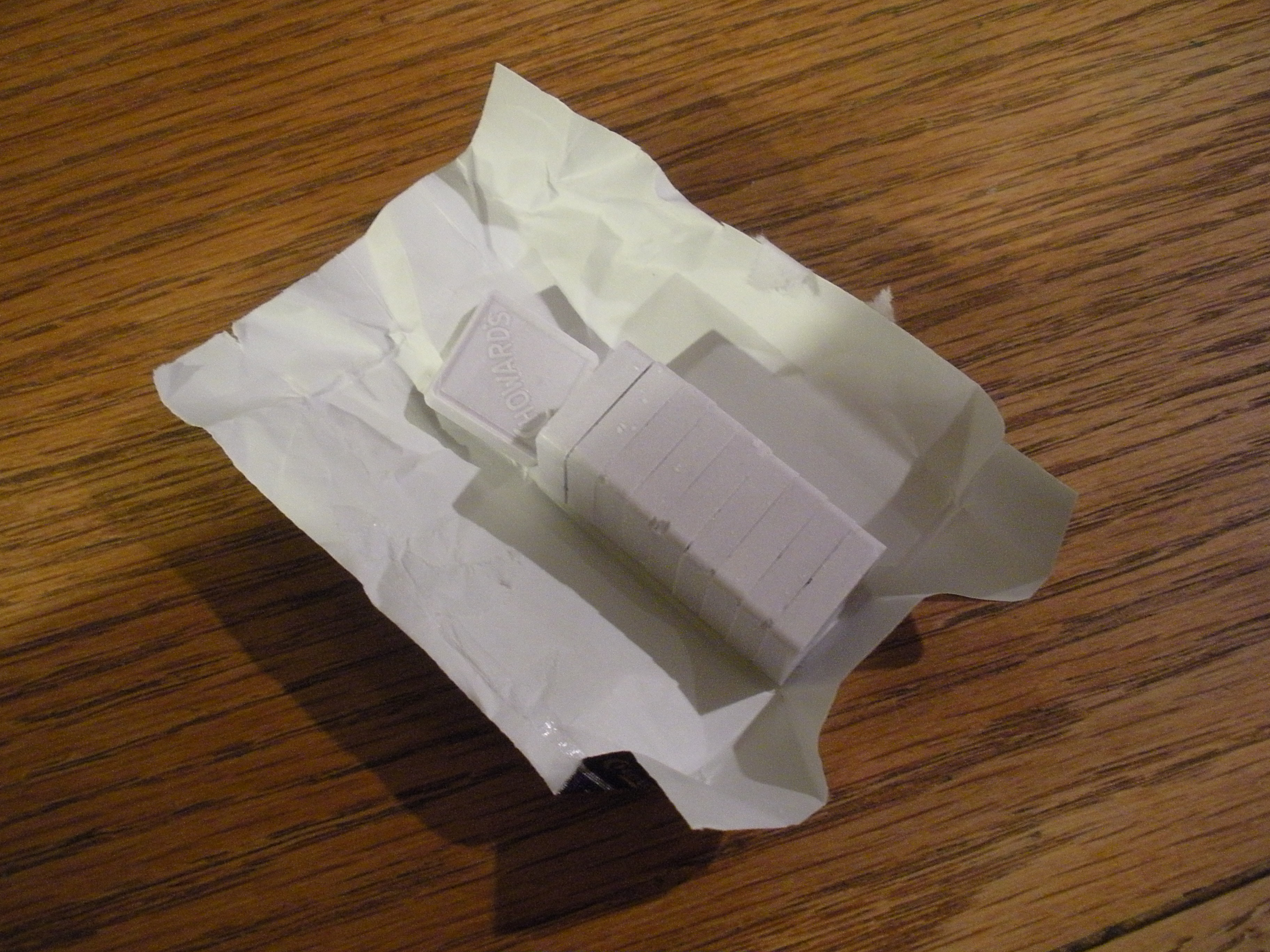
Opened package of Howard's Mint candies

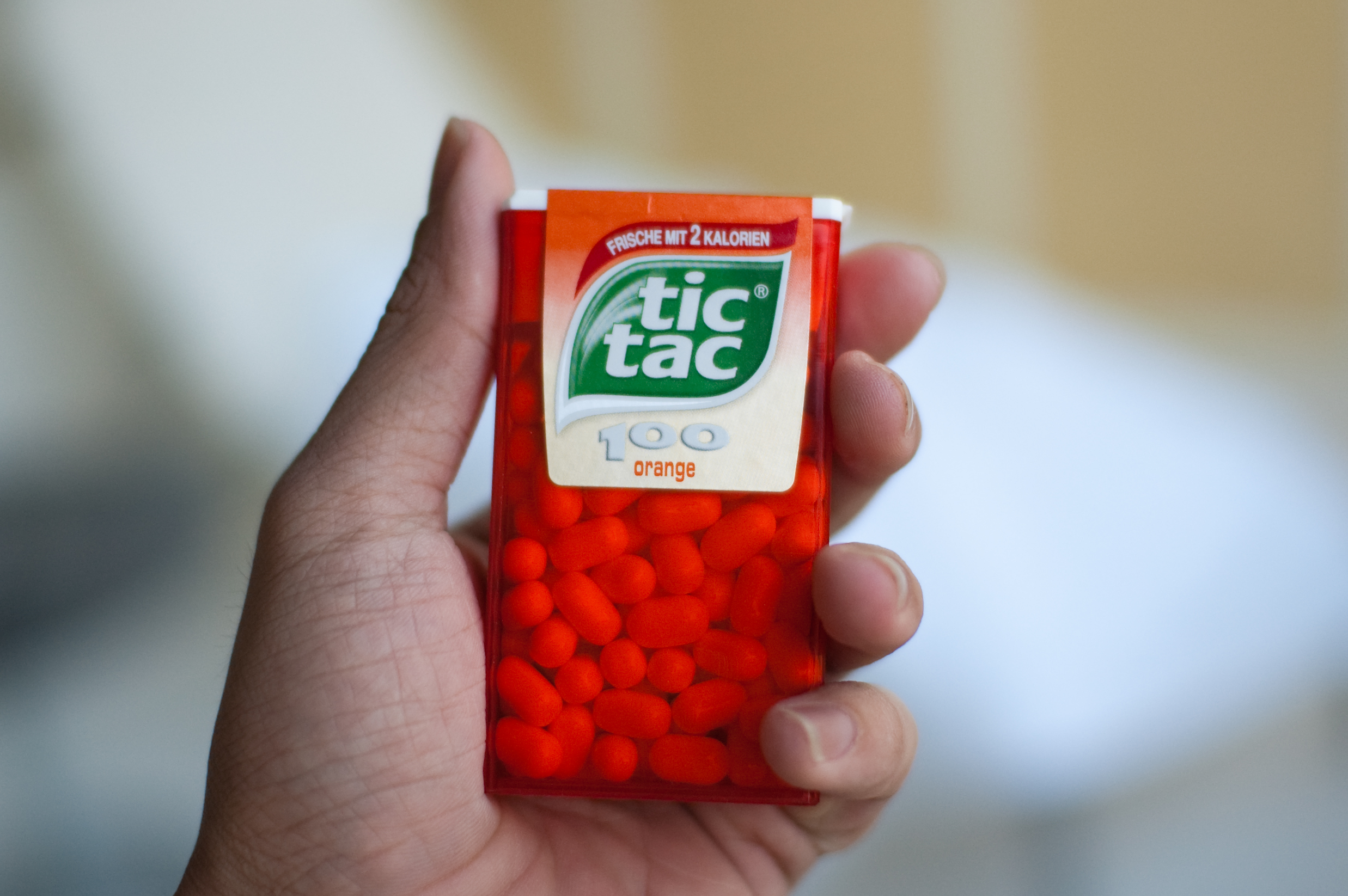
Tic Tac package of orange-flavored breath mints

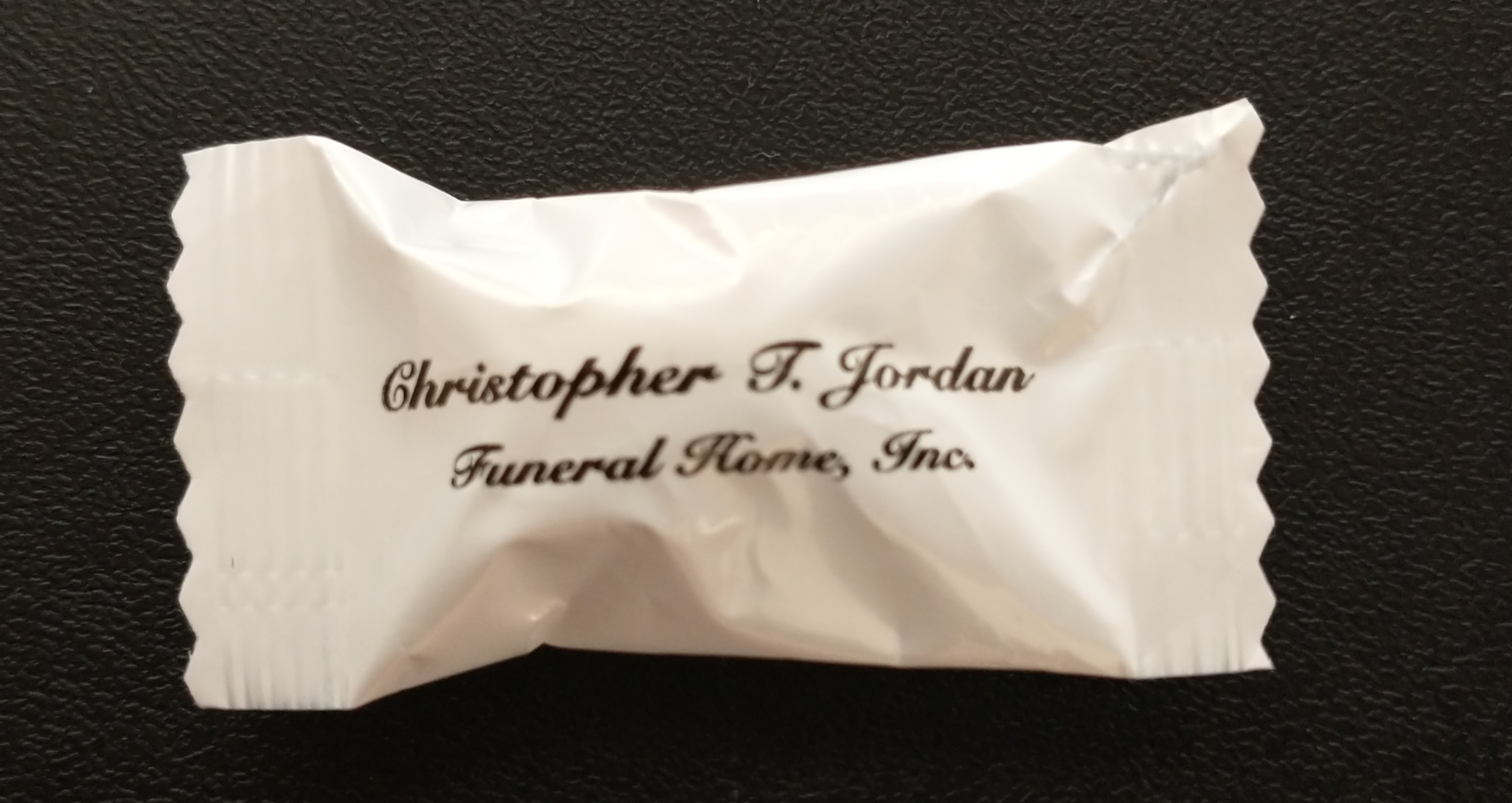
Mints provided to guests at a funeral home in the United States

== See also ==
- Tableting
- SweeTarts
- List of breath mints
- Spearmint (flavour)
