= Trebor (confectionery) =

British confectionery brand

Trebor (marque)
- Product type: Mint confectionery
- Current owner: Mondelez International
- Country: England
- Previous owners: Trebor Limited
- Products Extra Strong Mints
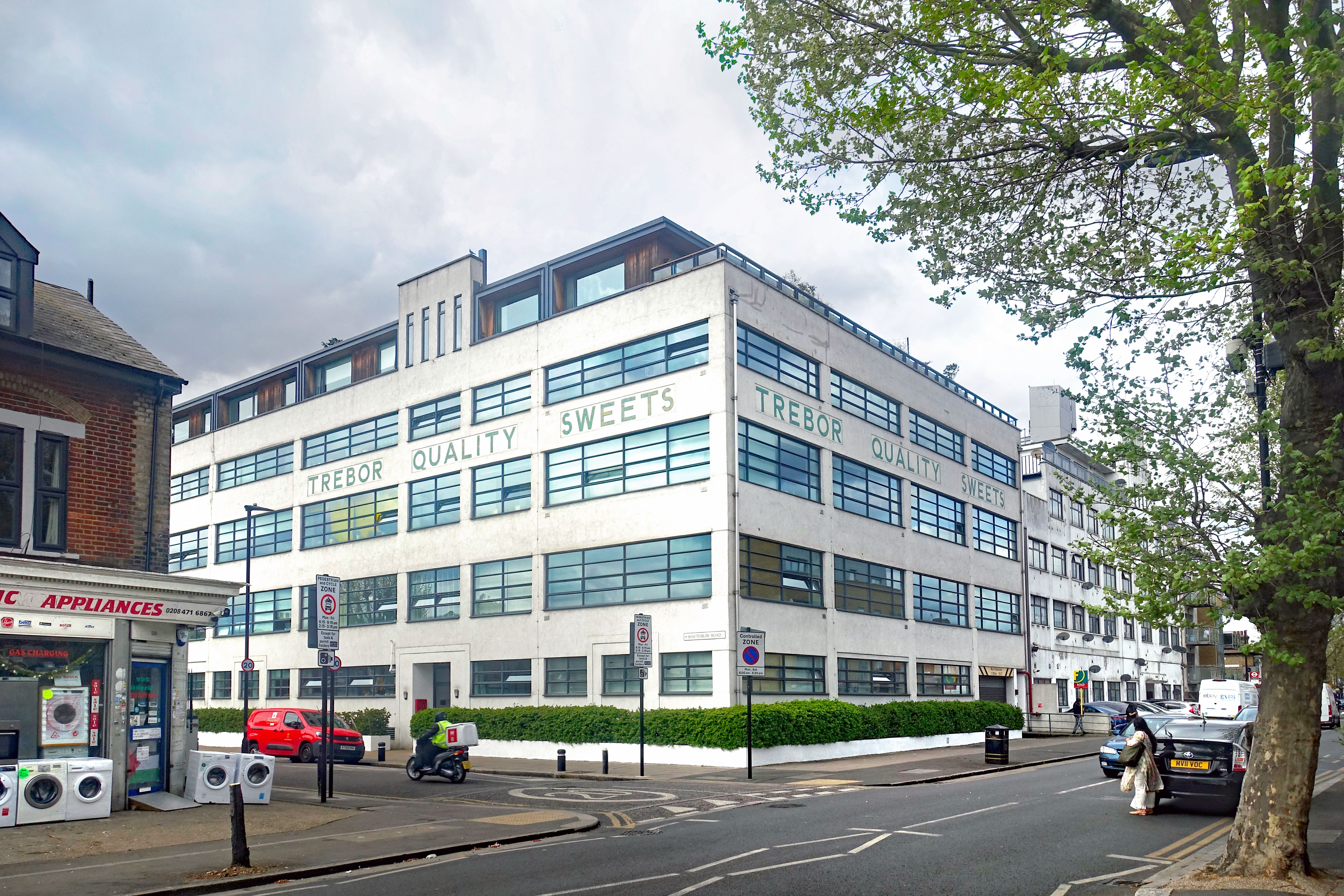
- Former original factory on Katherine Road (at Shaftesbury Road) in Forest Gate, pictured in 2025
- Formerly: Trebor Sharps (1907–1978)
- Type: Private (1907–1989); Marque (1989–present)
- Industry: Confectionery
- Founded: 4 January 1907; 119 years ago
- Founder: Robert Robertson • W.B. Woodcock • Thomas Henry King • Sydney Herbert Marks
- Fate: Bought by Cadbury Schweppes, merged with Bassetts as Trebor Bassetts
- Successor: Trebor Bassett
- Headquarters: London, England
- Brands: Fruit Salad • Black Jack • Moffat Toffee
- Subsidiaries: Barrett (currently owned by Valeo)

Trebor (/ˈtriːbɔːr/ TREE-bor) is a British confectionery brand-name owned by Mondelez International, and formerly a company of the same name.

== History ==
Trebor was founded on 4 January 1907 in south west Essex by W.B. Woodcock, Thomas Henry King, Robert Robertson and Sydney Herbert Marks from Leytonstone and was located on Katherine Road in Forest Gate, London. The name Trebor, the spelling of "Robert" backwards, was registered as a trademark four days after the end of World War I. On 18 April 1944, the factory in Katherine Road was hit by a German bomb. It bought Moffat toffee in 1959, and Jamesons Chocolates in 1960.

By the end of the 1960s, the company was exporting to over fifty countries; 20% of its output from its three factories was exported. The largest export market was the United States. By 1966, it had doubled its exports in four years. In the 1967 Birthday Honours, the Chairman John Marks (son of the founder) was appointed a CBE for the company's exports; he was president from 1956 to 1959 of the Cocoa, Chocolate and Confectionery Alliance.

By the end of the 1960s, it was the fourth largest confectionery manufacturing group in the United Kingdom; its main competitors were Rowntree Mackintosh Confectionery and Cadbury. Early advertising used the jingle, "Trebor mints are a minty bit stronger".

In January 1969, it bought the confectionery interests of Clarnico. In 1970, John Graham Marks, the grandson of the company's founder, became chairman of the company, and owned the company with his brother Ian; the company was family run and also had a Christian paternalistic ethos. In 1981, the company discontinued night shifts, as it believed that night shifts were possibly damaging to family life.

In December 1985, it bought Maynards for £7.5 million. In the middle of the 1980s, the company was the British market leader in branded mints and boiled sweets.

=== Acquisition by Cadbury ===
On Thursday 14 September 1989, Cadbury Schweppes bought the company for £147 million. The company was run as a subsidiary of Cadbury. At the time, the company employed around 3,000 people.

From 1 March 1990, the company was known as Trebor Bassett, a division of Cadbury. Production eventually moved to north Sheffield, off the A61.

== Structure ==
The company was headquartered in what was south-west Essex, in Woodford, Greater London. It initially had a factory at Forest Gate called the Trebor Works from 1935 in what is now the London Borough of Newham. Its main headquarters were at Clayhall.

In 1939, a factory on a five-acre site was opened on Brimington Road in Chesterfield, on the site of a former brewery next to Chesterfield railway station; the factory closed in 2005. The Trebor Bassett national distribution centre was in Holmewood, North East Derbyshire.

In 1978, a £15 million factory was opened in Colchester. It closed in March 2000.

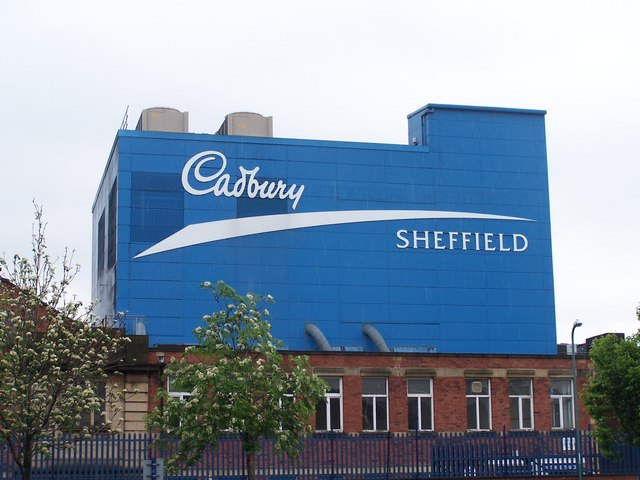
Current manufacture site on Beulah Road in Sheffield in May 2009; the Sheffield factory makes Extra Strong Mints, around 35 million packs a year

=== Awards ===
In April 1966, Trebor won the Queen's Award to Industry.

=== Cultural references ===
In 1987 the Steve Harley & Cockney Rebel song Mr. Soft was used in television adverts for Trebor Softmints and Softfruits, sung by Phillip Pope, imitating Harley's vocal style. EMI re-released the song as 7-inch single in the UK on 7 March 1988 "due to popular demand". Its release date was scheduled to coincide with Softmints' spring campaign, which ran nationally between March and the end of April 1988.

== Products ==
- Refreshers, launched in 1935
- Extra Strong Mints, known as Extra Strong Peppermints when launched in 1937
- SoftMints, peppermint or spearmint flavours
- SoftFruits, orange, lemon and strawberry flavours
- Regal Crown Sours fruit-flavoured hard candies, introduced 1953

== See also ==
- CAOBISCO
- Maynards
- Bassetts
- Barratt (confectionery)
