= Big Bear (food company) =

British food company

Big Bear Limited was a company formed in 2003 to acquire the Fox's Confectionery business owned by Northern Foods based in Leicester, England.

The deal was a management buy-in. The main brands bought included Fox's Glacier Mints, Paynes Poppets, XXX mints and Just Brazils, but not the unrelated Fox's Biscuits, also owned by Northern.

In 2006, Big Bear diversified into breakfast cereals and cereal bars by acquiring Sugar Puffs and Harvest Cereal Bars from multinational food and beverage conglomerate PepsiCo.

Big Bear was acquired by Raisio Group in 2011.

In December 2017, it was announced that Raisio had agreed the sale of its Big Bear confectionery division to Valeo Foods.
