= Black Jack (confectionery) =

Aniseed-flavour confectionery

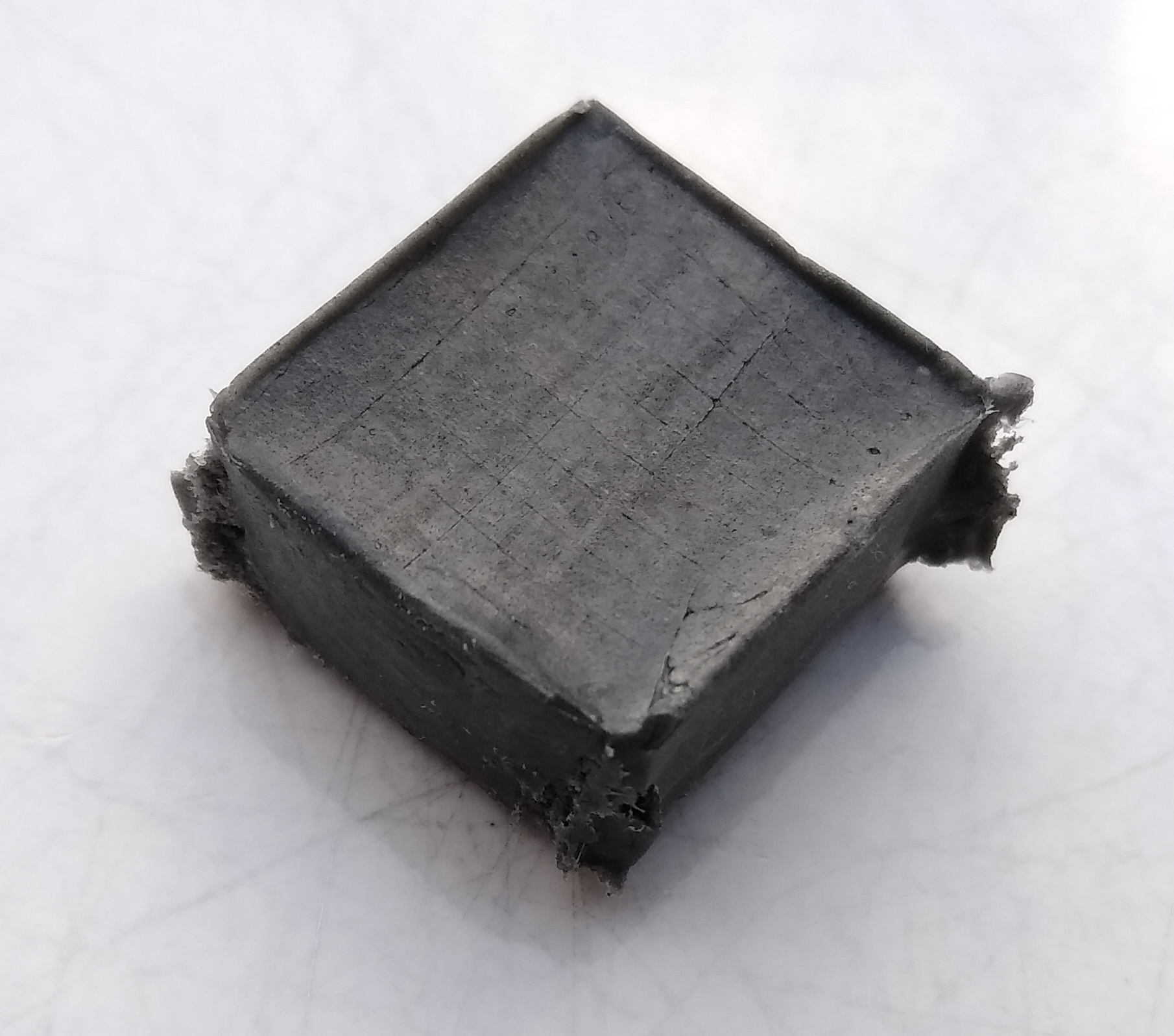
- Product type: Confectionery
- Current owner: Barratt (Valeo)
- Introduced: 1920; 106 years ago
- Related brands: Fruit Salad • Wham Bar • Flumps
- Markets: Europe
- Previous owners: Trebor • Monkhill Confectionary (Cadbury Schweppes) • Tangerine Confectionary
- Website: valeoconfectionery.com/barratt
Nutritional value per
- Energy: 327 kcal (1,370 kJ)
- Carbohydrates: 74.2g
- Sugars: 41.0g
- Dietary fiber: 0.0g
- Fat: 3.2g
- Saturated: 1.6g
- Protein: 0.4g
Vitamins and minerals
Minerals	Quantity %DV^{†}
Sodium	0% 0.79 mg

Black Jack is a type of "aniseed flavour chew" according to its packaging. It is a chewy confectionery manufactured under Valeo Confectionery's Barratt brand in UK and Spain. Introduced in the 1920s by Trebor, the wrapper originally showed gollywogs on it.

== Ingredients ==
The recipe has varied over the years. In 2021 the ingredients were: glucose syrup, sugar, palm oil, colour (vegetable carbon), hydrolysed pea protein, citric acid, aniseed oil, acidity regulator (trisodium citrate).

Each 250 g pack contains 46 chews.

== See also ==
- Fruit Salad
