= Millar McCowan =

Scottish confectionery company

- Company type: Private
- Industry: Confectionery
- Founded: 2006
- Founder: Andrew McCowan, John Millar
- Headquarters: Stenhousemuir, Falkirk, Scotland

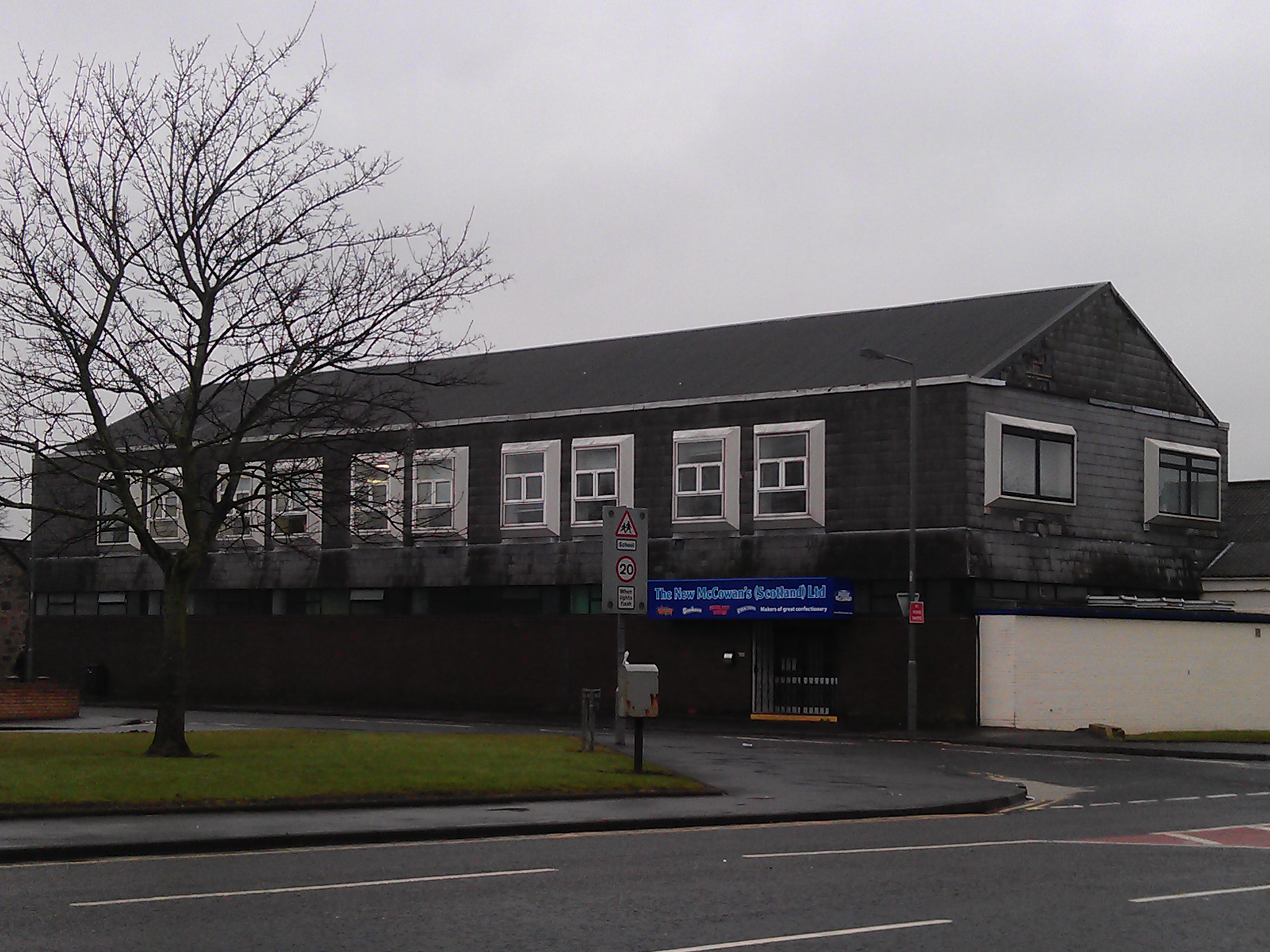
The former Millar McCowan factory in Tryst Road Stenhousemuir.

Millar McCowan was a Scottish confectionery manufacturer. Owned by Andrew Walsh, who also runs Thornycroft. (A confectionery distribution company.) For the brands of McCowan’s and John Millar & Sons. Among its brands are Wham Bars, and Highland Toffee. It also produces traditional Scottish sweeties such as Pan Drops and Bonbons. Millar McCowan was Scotland’s largest independent confectionery manufacturer. It had production facilities at both Broxburn and Stenhousemuir (near Falkirk). In October 2011, the company went into administration the McCowans brand (separate from the McCowans company) was transferred firstly to Tangerine Confectionery at the same time, the Millar brand was transferred to Nisha Enterprises. Both Tangerine and Nisha chose to operate from their existing facilities leading to the closure of Millar McCowan's Stenhousemuir and Broxburn plants.
