= McCowan =

McCowan can refer to the following:

- McCowan Baronets, British baronetcy
- Millar McCowan, Scottish confectionery company
- McCowan (surname)
- McCowan Road, a major thoroughfare in Scarborough, Toronto, Ontario, Canada
  - A local name for York Regional Road 67 in York Region, Ontario, Canada
  - McCowan station, a former station of Line 3 Scarborough in Toronto, Ontario, Canada
- McCowan's, Scottish confectionery company
