= Fruit Salad =

Fruit salad is a food serving made of fruit.

Fruit Salad may also refer to:

- Fruit Salad (confectionery), a raspberry & pineapple flavoured chew
- "Fruit Salad" (song), a 1993 song by the Wiggles
- "Fruit Salad", a song by Tierra Whack from her 2018 album Whack World
- "Fruit Salad", a 2021 song by Tom Cardy

== Other uses ==
- Medal ribbon, a decoration worn on military uniforms referred to colloquially as "fruit salad"
