= John Walker Sharpe =

Scottish physicist

John Walker Sharpe FRSE FIP (21 October 1916 – 14 August 1997) was a 20th-century Scottish physicist specialising in the electron microscope.

== Life ==
Sharpe was born in Stenhousemuir on 21 October 1916. He was educated at Falkirk High School. He won a bursary to Glasgow University where he studied Mathematics and Natural Philosophy (Physics) graduating MA in 1939. He then won a Ferguson Scholarship and used this for postgraduate studies at St. John's College, Cambridge. However these studies were interrupted by the Second World War and he instead served as Scientific Officer to the Mine Warfare Department of the Admiralty. This initially looked at mine design then he focussed upon the demagnetisation of ships.

After the war he began lecturing in physics at Aberdeen University under Prof R V Jones.

In 1947, Sharpe moved into private industry as a researcher at Imperial Chemical Industries (ICI) at Runcorn. Here his pioneering work on electron microscopy allowed the first photographs of Trypanosoma congolense which led to the development of the cure for "sleeping sickness" in African cattle.

In 1950, Sharpe became Senior Lecturer in Physics at Strathclyde University and became a Fellow of the Institute of Physics. In 1970 he was elected a Fellow of the Royal Society of Edinburgh. His proposers were Prof Donald Pack, John Meadows Jackson, Arthur F. Brown and Ian Sneddon.

Sharpe died in Bearsden on 14 August 1997 following a long illness.

== Family ==
His first wife Sheena died in 1976. He was survived by his second wife, Betty and two children.

== Publications ==
- The Electron Microscope and its Applications (1955)
- High Resolution Electron Microscopy (1969)
