= Flumps (sweet) =

British sort of marshmallow

Barratts Flumps
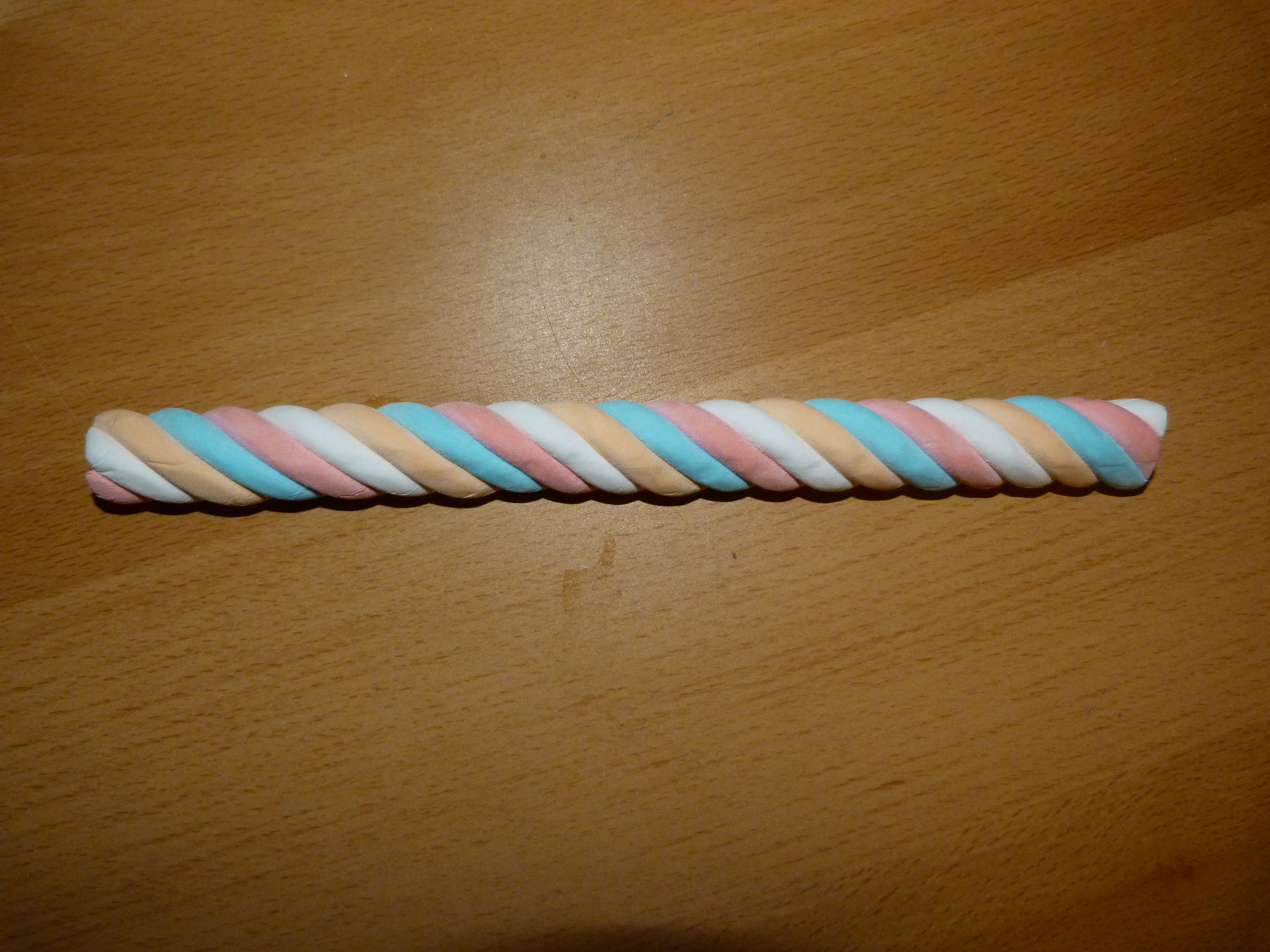
- A Flumps Marshmallow
- Alternative names: Marpoles
- Type: Confectionery
- Place of origin: United Kingdom
- Created by: Barratt
- Main ingredients: Glucose fructose corn syrup, sugar, water, gelatin, cornflour

A Flumps (sing. & pl.) is a British sweet (candy) made of marshmallow. The sweet is a combination of pink, yellow, white and blue marshmallow, which has the appearance of a long, twisted helix. Flumps are sold in the United Kingdom and are made by the confectioner Barratt.

They consist of glucose-fructose syrup, sugar, gelatin, corn flour, natural flavouring, and natural colours (Riboflavin, Cochineal). Flumps are sold as individual "cables" and in packets of “Mini Flumps”.

Flumps have been sold since 1981 or earlier.

== See also ==
- Peeps, marshmallow candy shaped like a chick.
- Circus Peanuts, marshmallow candy shaped like a peanut
- Jet-Puffed Marshmallows, American brand of marshmallows.
