= Daintee =

Sri Lankan confectionery company

Daintee Ltd.
- Industry: Confectionery; Food and beverage
- Founded: 1984; 42 years ago
- Headquarters: 72C, Kandawala Road, Ratmalana, Sri Lanka
- Revenue: $5.6 million
- Parent: Sunshine Consumer Lanka Ltd
- Website: Official Website

Daintee is a company based in Sri Lanka that produces confectionery and other food products. It is the market leader in confectionery sales in Sri Lanka.

== History ==
Daintee Limited, a family owned and operated company, was founded in 1984, by Dhammika Gunaratne and Ayal Jayatilake, in collaboration with English confectionary firm Barker and Dobson. In 1996 it was renamed Daintee Foods Limited. In 2020 the company was acquired by Sunshine Holdings for Rs. 1.7 billion, through Watawal Tea Ceylon, a subsidiary of Sunshine Holdings.

The company now produce a very large product range consisting of over 75 products such as candies, toffees, jellies, chocolates, gum, desserts, biscuits, sugar free confectionery, snacks, breakfast cereals, teas, and noodles. These are marketed in Sri Lanka as well as several other countries under brand names such as Daintee, Milady, Bensons, Chito, X-tra, Mr Bitz, Longlive and Denmi. Daintee maintains a 40 percent market share in toffees and sweets in Sri Lanka.

== Sugar Free Confectionery ==
In 2010 Daintee launched a range of sugar free confectionery under the brand name Longlive. The products contain xylitol, a sugar substitute that has been claimed as promoting dental health.
