= Revels (confectionery) =

British brand of confectionery

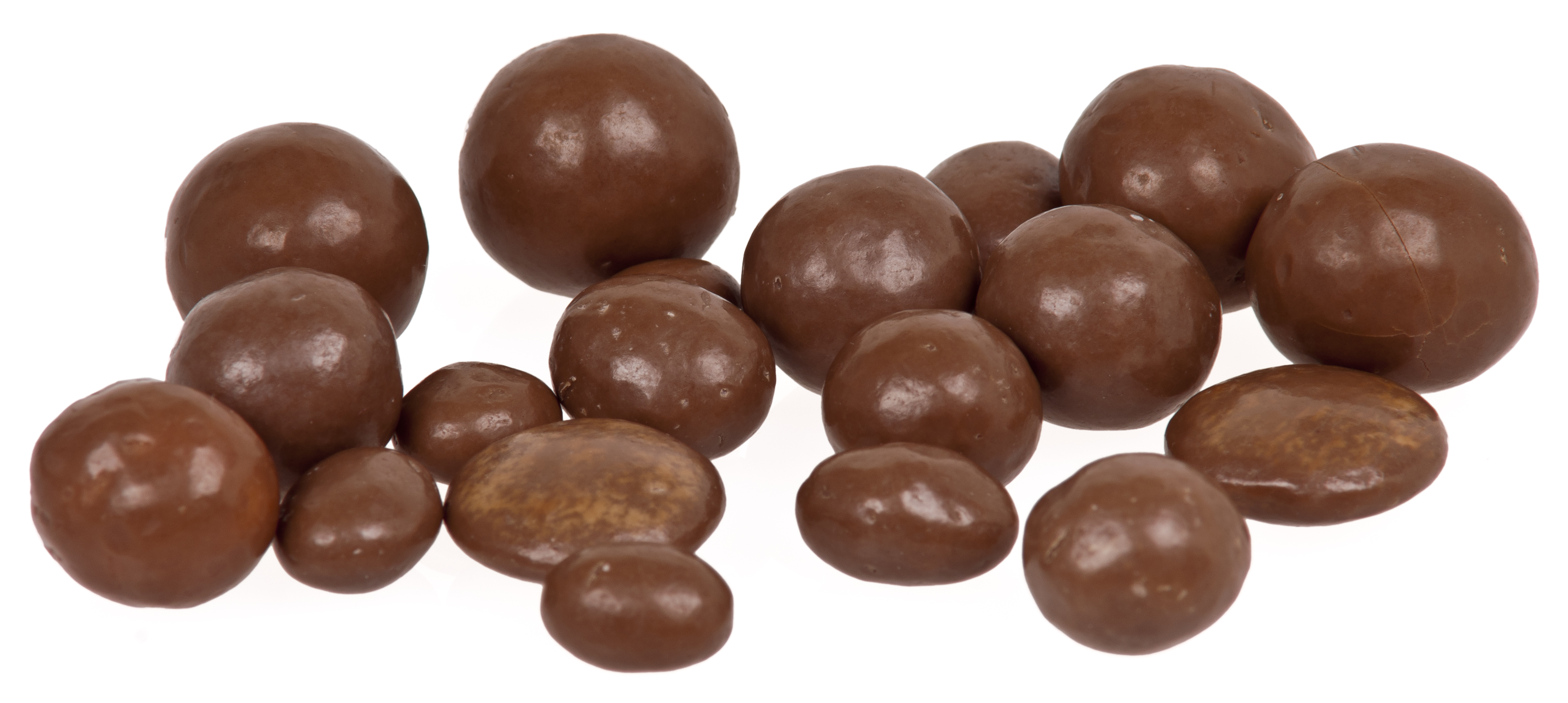
- Revels chocolates
- Type: Confectionery
- Associated cuisine: United Kingdom
- Created by: Mars, Inc.
- Invented: 1967; 59 years ago
- Main ingredients: Chocolate

Revels are a chocolate coated confectionery with assorted centres made by Mars, Inc. They were first introduced into the United Kingdom in 1967.

Originally, Revels had orange creme, coconut, toffee, or peanut centres, along with Galaxy Counters (Minstrels minus exterior shell) and Maltesers. However, the coconut centres were later replaced with coffee creme, and the peanuts with raisins.

== Galaxy Counters ==
Galaxy Counters were initially available as a product in their own right, but since their discontinuation they were only sold as part of the Revels selection. In 2010, however, Galaxy Counters were relaunched under the Galaxy brand.

== 2008 'eviction' ==
In July 2008 Revels started a Big Brother-style eviction campaign where one flavour from the bag would be replaced by a special limited edition flavour. Consumers were asked to nominate on the RevelsEviction.com website Voting closed on 9 September 2008. The flavour attracting the most votes was coffee, which received nearly half the votes cast. Raisin received around 25%, with the remaining votes spread fairly evenly among the other flavours. The coffee flavour was briefly replaced with strawberry, but returned in early 2009.

== See also ==
- List of confectionery brands
- Poppets a similar confectionary by Valeo
