= McCowan's =

Scottish confectionery company

McCowans
- Company type: Private
- Industry: Confectionery
- Founded: 1900
- Founder: Andrew McCowan
- Defunct: 2006
- Fate: Merged with John Millar & Sons
- Successor: Millar McCowan
- Headquarters: Stenhousemuir, Scotland

McCowan's Ltd was a Scottish confectionery company specialising in toffee and fudge. Their most famous product was Highland Toffee.

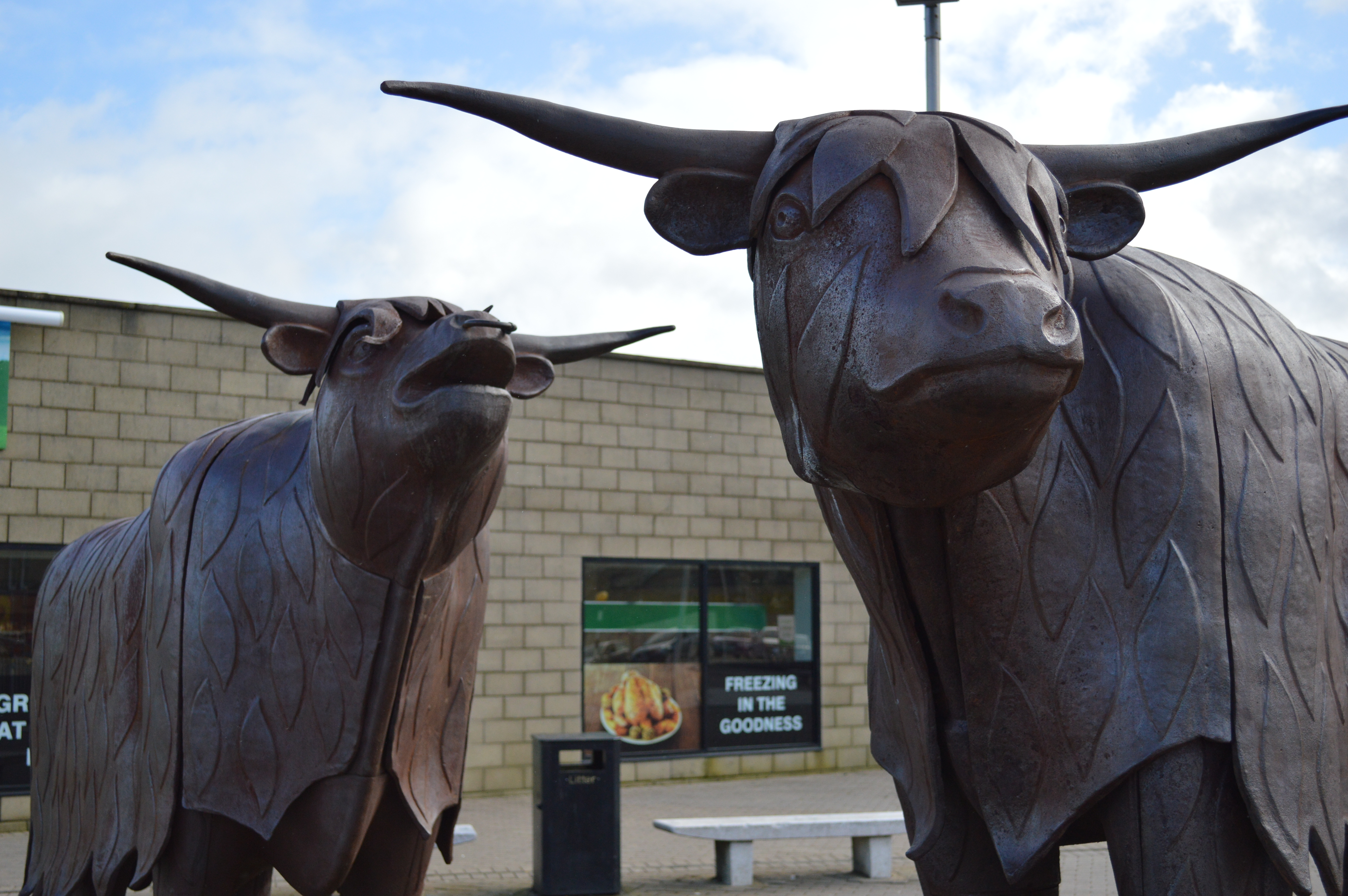
McCowan's Highland Toffee statue

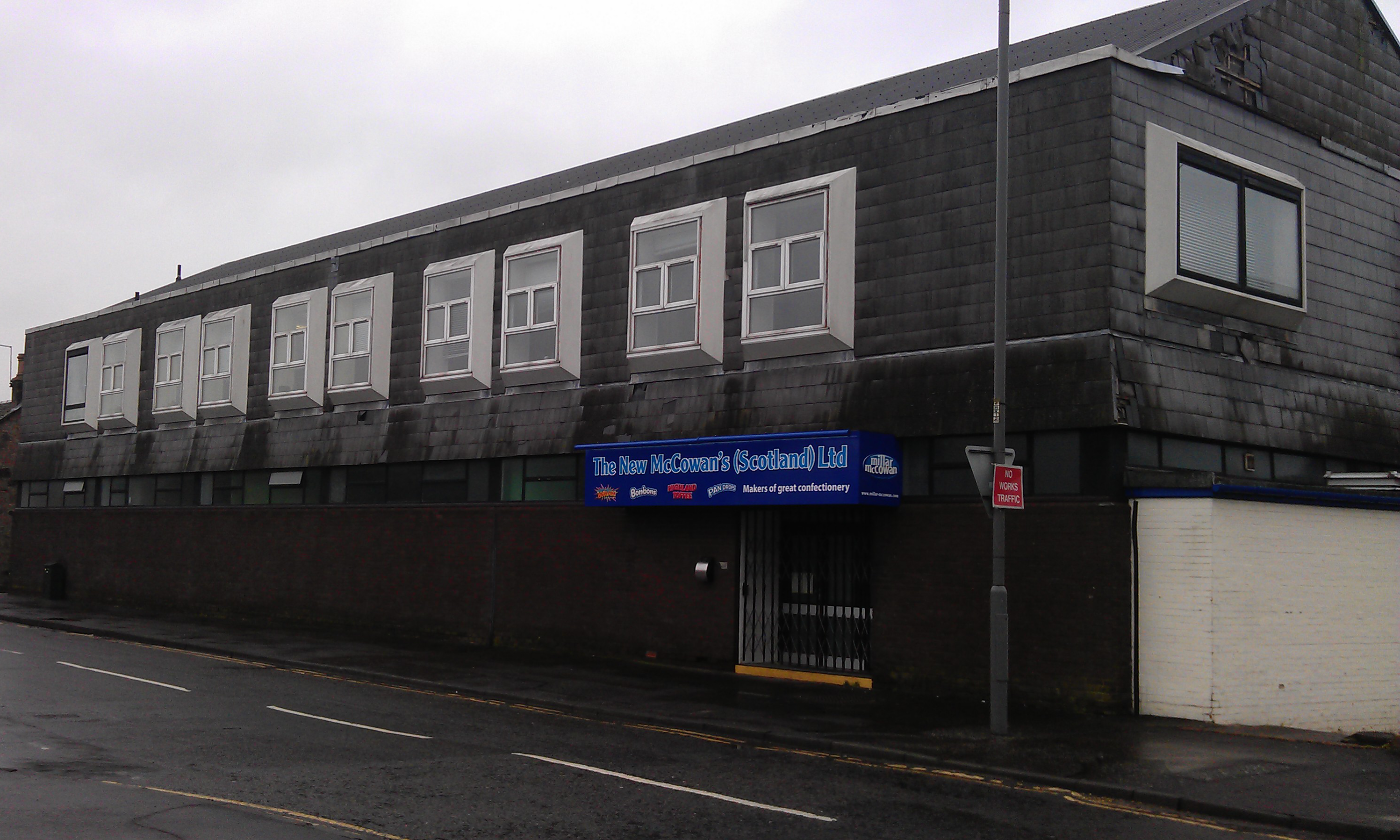
The former McCowan's factory in Tryst Road Stenhousemuir.

== History ==
McCowan's originally began life as an aerated water business run by Andrew McCowan. His wife attempted to make some extra money on the side by selling toffee from the window of their house in Stenhousemuir. The secret recipe for the toffee was bought by McCowan in a pub from a man selling the toffee for a pint. The toffee proved more successful than the lemonade and soon became the primary family income.

Within 15 years, McCowan was producing a variety of confections including tablet, rock, snowballs, lollipops and macaroons. But it was in the 1920s that McCowan began to produce the small toffee chews that would become the company's flagship confection - McCowan's Highland Toffee had arrived.

In the early years, Andrew worked from a shop in Church Street, but in 1924 he opened a factory in its current location of Tryst Road. In 1951 Andrew died, and the company passed into the hands of his son Robert McCowan. In 1959 Robert accepted an offer from the Nestlé company, yet McCowan's still sold products under its own brand

During the 1980s the company introduced the Wham Bar. Further development and an agreement with A.G. Barr also led to production of the Irn-Bru Bar.

In 1987 Nestlé merged with Rowntree's leading to a short term re-branding of McCowan's under the Nestlé-Rowntree name. In 1989 a management buyout occurred and the company once again became independent. In 1996 Dutch confectioner Phideas purchased the company, before the company became independent once more in 2003.

In 2005 the company was purchased by Graham Wallace and Andy Allan, who later that year bought John Millar & Sons. As a result, McCowan's ceased to exist as an independent company and merged with John Millar & Sons to become Millar McCowan Millar McCowan went into administration in 2006, and a new company, The New McCowan's Ltd, was started under director Kevin Brewer. In October 2011, The New McCowan's Ltd also went into administration, selling some of its brands to Tangerine Confectionery. Other brands were sold to Nisha Enterprises.

The former McCowan's factory in Stenhousemuir was closed in 2011, with some of its machinery moving to Livingston to a new Nisha Enterprises factory.
