= Barker and Dobson =

Barker and Dobson were confectioners whose business started as a sweet shop in Paradise Street in Liverpool in 1834, owned by Joseph Dobson and his wife whose maiden name was Barker. They started a factory in Everton and its mints and toffees were named after the place.

The business grew substantially but was taken over and the brand is now owned by Valeo Confectionery.
