= John Millar & Sons =

Scottish confectionery company

- Company type: Private
- Industry: Confectionery
- Founded: 1844
- Founder: John Millar
- Defunct: 2006
- Fate: Merged with McCowan’s
- Successor: Millar McCowan
- Headquarters: Broxburn, Scotland

John Millar & Sons is a Scottish confectionery company specialising in Mints and Boiled Sweets.

== History ==
The company began in 1844, when John Millar started bakery in Leith, shortly afterwards, the business began selling sweets manufactured in the back room. Millars has become widely known for many sweets including Pan Drops, Chocolate Eclairs, and boiled confectionery such as Blackcurrant & Liquorice.
