= Sunshine Holdings =

Sri Lankan conglomerate holding company

- Logo of Sunshine Holdings represents a conch shell which was introduced in 2012
- Company type: Public
- Traded as: CSE: SUN.N0000
- ISIN: LK0160N00008
- Industry: Holding company; Healthcare; Consumer goods; Agribusiness
- Founded: 16 June 1973; 52 years ago
- Headquarters: Colombo, Sri Lanka
- Key people: D. A. Cabraal (Chairman); S. G. Sathasivam (Director / Group Chief Executive Officer)
- Brands: Zesta; Watawala; Ran Kahata; Daintee
- Revenue: ▲LKR51.887 billion (2023)
- Operating income: ▲LKR7.001 billion (2023)
- Net income: ▼LKR3.616 million (2023)
- Total assets: ▲LKR36.008 billion (2023)
- Total equity: ▲LKR19.237 billion (2023)
- Owners: Lamurep Investments Limited (55.18%); Akbar Brothers Pvt Ltd (10.01%); Deepcar Limited (9.26%)
- Number of employees: ▼1,660 (2023)
- Subsidiaries: Sunshine Healthcare Lanka Ltd; Sunshine Consumer Lanka Ltd; Watawala Plantations PLC
- Website: www.sunshineholdings.lk

Sunshine Holdings PLC is a Sri Lankan conglomerate holding company that is engaged in the healthcare, consumer goods and agribusiness sectors. Sunshine Holdings was incorporated on 16 June 1973, and listed on the Colombo Stock Exchange in 1983. Sunshine Holdings ranked 45th in LMD 100, a list of quoted companies in Sri Lanka by revenue in the 2020/21 edition.

== History ==
The company originates in 1967 with the establishment of Lanka Medicals pharmacy in Gampola. In 1977, a 'super centre' was opened in Kandy, the first of its kind in Sri Lanka. Sunshine Holdings was incorporated on 16 June 1973, and listed on the Colombo Stock Exchange in 1983. The 50th anniversary of the company was celebrated in 2017. In 2019, Sunshine Holdings was the 16th largest conglomerate company in Sri Lanka with a brand value of LKR3,947 million. The company reduced its investment in oil palm farming and dairy production and increased its stake in Watawala Tea Ceylon, a marketing company that brands Zesta and Watawala. 75% of Watawala Plantations' ownership was transferred to a joint venture with Wilmar International. In 2020, Sunshine Holdings acquired the Sri Lankan confectionery manufacturer, Daintee for LKR1.7 billion. The company was diversifying beyond its brand, Watawala tea. Daintee had a market share of 40% in the toffee and sweets sector. Sunshine Holdings merged its healthcare business with Akbar Brothers healthcare division.

== Operations ==
The logo of Sunshine Holdings is a conch shell, the logo was introduced in 2012 as a part of a rebranding effort. The company appointed Sudarshan Jain as an independent director to the board of directors in February 2022. Before joining the company, Jain had 40 years of experience and acted as the managing director of Abbott Healthcare India. The company also appointed Ruvini Fernando to the board of directors in February 2022. Fernando is a capital markets professional with over 30 years of experience. Healthguard, the pharmacy chain of the company partnered with, Swisse, an Australian vitamin brand to expand its wellness line. Sunshine Holdings received a credit rating of AA+(lka) from Fitch Ratings on 9 May 2022, and the outlook was adjudged as stable. For the year ended on 31 March 2022, the company posted a revenue of LKR32.2billion. It was a 32.2% revenue growth on a year-on-year basis.

Sunshine Holdings joined "Manudam Mehewara", an emergency relief initiative targeting the communities affected by the Sri Lankan economic crisis. The initiative aims to provide relief to 200,000 families across all 25 districts of the country. In 2021, the company was conferred the gold award for Best Investor Relations team at the CFA Capital Market Awards. Sunshine Holdings' tea brands, Watawala and Zesta ranked 44th and 78th respectively in Brand Finance's 2022 the 100 most valuable brands in Sri Lanka report.

== See also ==
- List of Sri Lankan public corporations by market capitalisation
