= Peppy (mascot) =

Polar bear mascot of Fox's Glacier Mints

Peppy (from peppermint) is the polar bear mascot and icon of Fox's Glacier Mints, a brand of boiled mint manufactured by Fox's Confectionery in the United Kingdom. Peppy was introduced to confectionery packaging in 1922. At around the same time, Fox's commissioned a taxidermist to shoot and stuff a real polar bear, which was put out on display at such public events as football matches and carnivals to advertise the Glacier Mints. The exhibition was taken all over the country, and eventually incorporated as many as four other stuffed polar bears. In the 1960s, after the advent of televised advertising and after Rowntrees acquired the company, the exhibition was deemed politically incorrect and was removed from public circulation. Television commercials which featured Peppy were later produced.

In 2003, the original Peppy – measuring 1.5 m (4 ft 11 in) high and 2 m (6 ft 7 in) long, and with an indeterminate gender – was donated to the Leicester Museum & Art Gallery in Leicester, the city in which Fox's Confectionery is based. The stuffed bear had been lost in a company factory for approximately 20 years. A brand manager said of the donation, "We found it in the back when we were clearing out and decided to donate it to a museum - the best place for it. We didn't want it in the reception because it's so gory we feared it could scare the customers when they visited." After the acquisition, the museum commenced a restoration process which took six years to complete. Peppy was displayed in a public exhibition at the museum from 24 January to 5 April 2009.
