= George Osborne Barratt =

British confectioner (1827–1906)

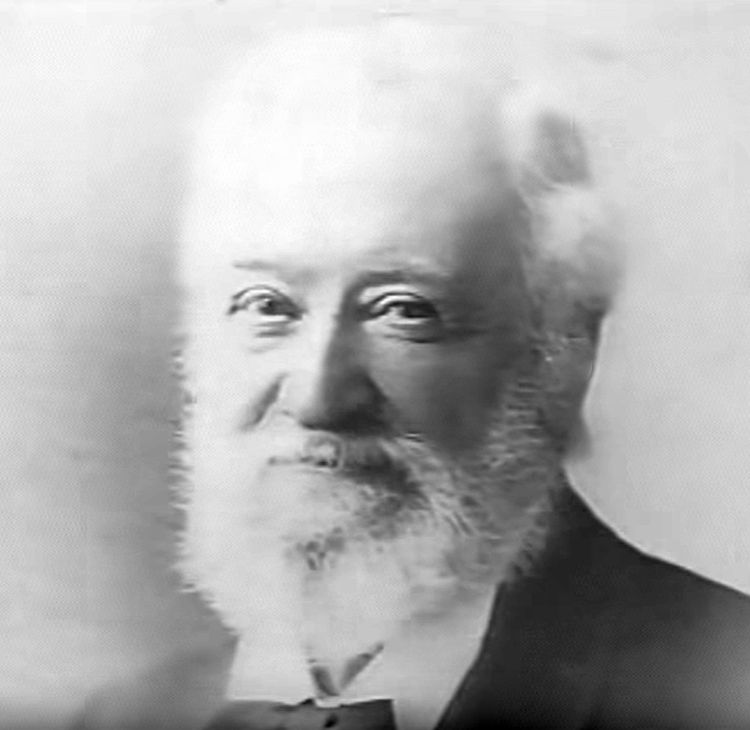
- George Osborne Barratt, founder of Barratt & Co. Ltd., Confectioners
- Born: 1827; Hoxton
- Died: 3 October 1906 (aged 78–79); Crouch Hill, Middlesex
- Occupation: Confectioner
- Spouse: Sarah Peterson

George Osborne Barratt (1827–1906) was a confectioner who, at age 21, set up what was to become Barratt & Co., Ltd., using premises at 32 Shepherdess Walk, Hoxton. Several of his siblings and children became involved in the business, aiding its growth and development. By the time of Barratt's death the firm had become the largest confectionery manufacturer in the world. The company was taken over by Bassett's in 1966, then by Cadbury Schweppes in 1989 and, since 2008, has been part of the Tangerine Confectionery portfolio. The Barratt brand name was brought back in 2018.

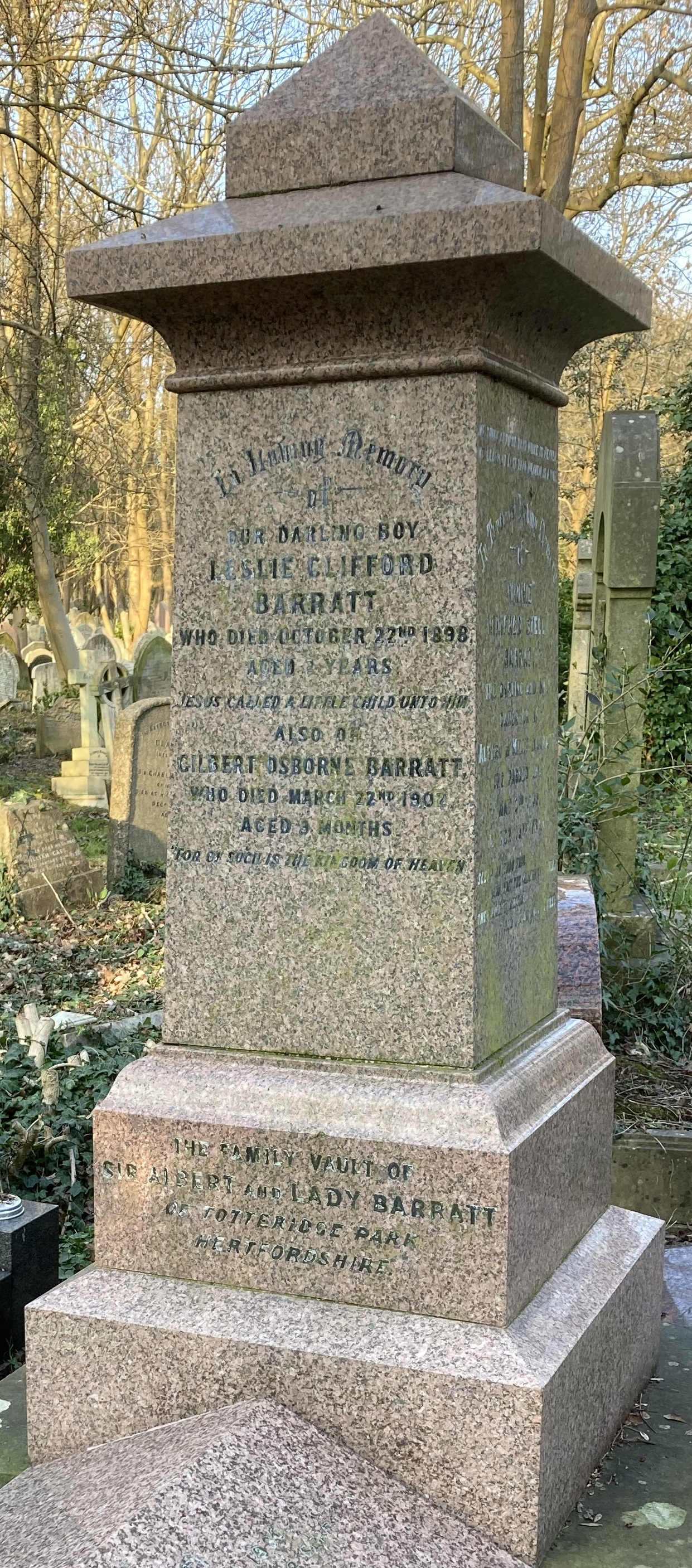
The Barratt family vault in Highgate Cemetery (east side)

== Family life ==
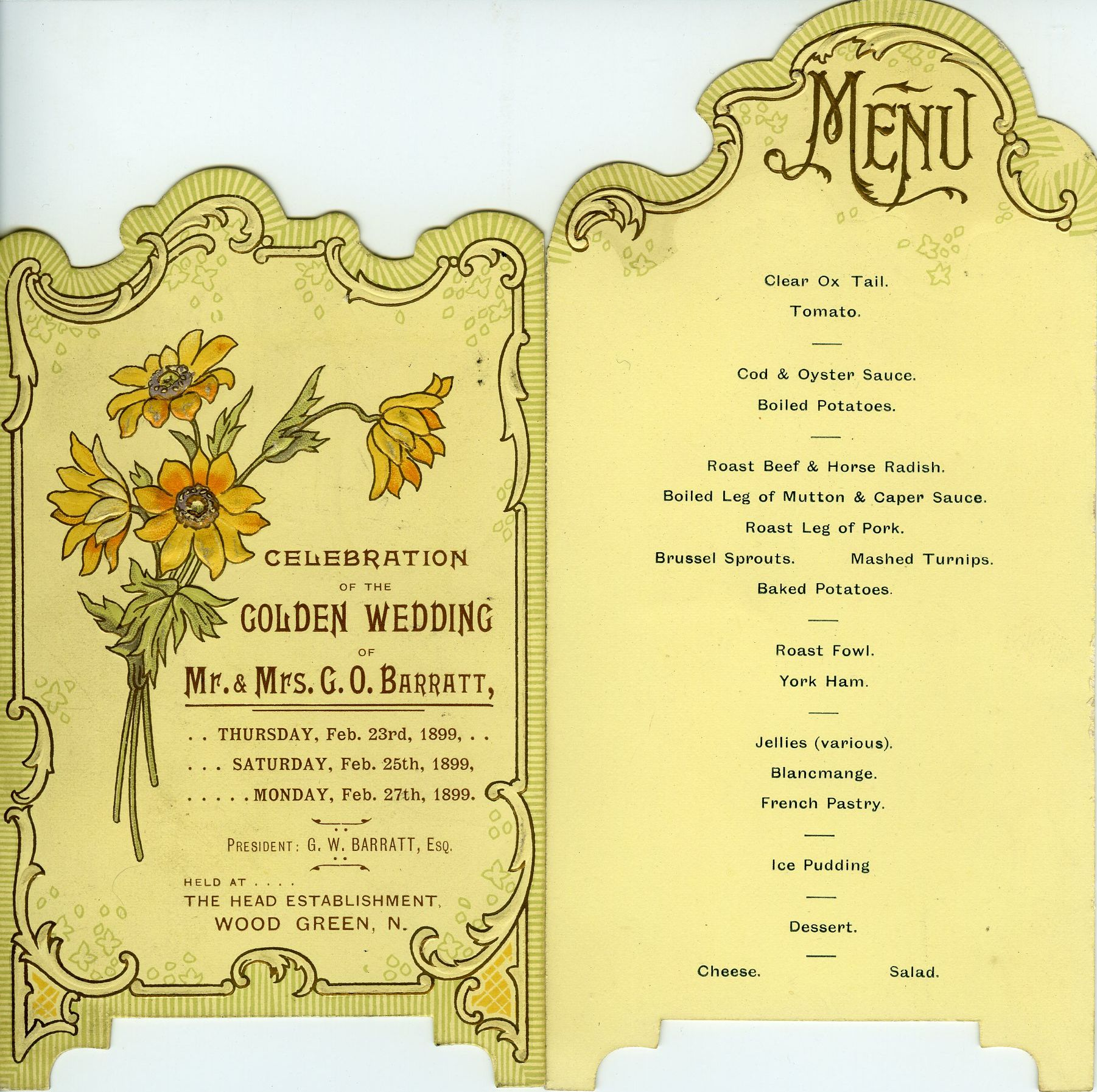
Invitation card and menu for Golden Wedding of founder of Barratt & Co. Ltd.

George Osborne Barratt (1827 - 3 October 1906) was the tenth of fifteen children of William Barratt and Caroline Jane Harriskine. The Barratts were law bookbinders at 21 Portugal Street, near Lincoln's Inn. George married Sarah Peterson on 18 February 1849, at St Clement Danes, Westminster. They had six girls and five boys, all born in Hoxton. The couple celebrated their golden wedding over three days in February 1899, beginning with “an excellently-prepared banquet […] to which ample justice was done”, provided by Messrs. Spiers and Pond, well known for their catering establishments. On the second day some 200 male employees were entertained at a banquet in the company's main show room; followed, next day, by a similar celebration with 250 female staff. After many years of illness and several operations Barratt died from jaundice at his home at Holly Mount, Crouch Hill, Middlesex on 3 October 1906, leaving an estate worth nearly £154,000. He was buried at Highgate Cemetery on 5 October, alongside his wife, who was interred on 7 September 1905.

Barratt was known to be a very hard worker and passionate about his endeavour. He acknowledged, though, that he was not a practical confectioner. He couldn't make sweets but he could "think" them. The press called Mr G. O. Barratt "King of Confectioners".

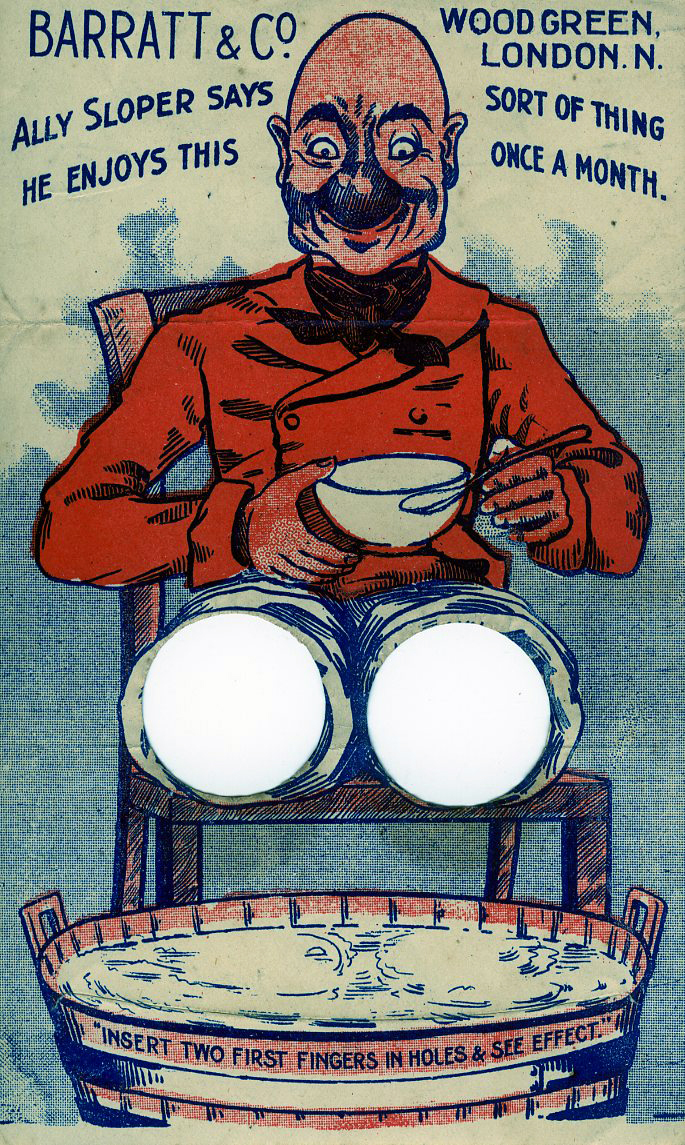
Give-away to children who bought sweets from the company

== Business life ==
George did not follow the family trade. After leaving school he entered a lawyer's office where he remained for some years. After his marriage he went into short-lived business as a pastry cook with his brother James. He then started a sugar confectionery business employing one sugar boiler at 32 Shepherdess Walk, Hoxton. The enterprise was successful: it grew rapidly and neighbouring properties were bought up to allow for the expansion. Barratt himself travelled, in his pony and trap, to deliver and promote his products in and around London. Then, his eldest son George (1852-1928), when he was about 17, took over these journeys, and Barratt senior worked large parts of the country for the next 20 years. Part of the company's success was attributable to a product sold as 'stickjaw' toffee – said to have been made accidentally – that was very popular with children.

When the company outgrew its Hoxton site it moved to a former piano factory, owned by a Mr Ivory, in Mayes Road, Wood Green, north of London. The first building was ready in 1882. By 1904 eight buildings were in use on nearly 5 acres, despite the setback of a serious fire on 18 October 1899 in which five buildings were destroyed. Two years later there were around 2,000 employees producing 350 tonnes of sweets a week, making Barratts the largest confectionery manufacturer in the world.

=== After Barratt's death ===
Following Barratt's death in 1906, his eldest son, George William (1851-1928) took over as chairman.
