= Barratt (confectionery) =

British confectionery brand

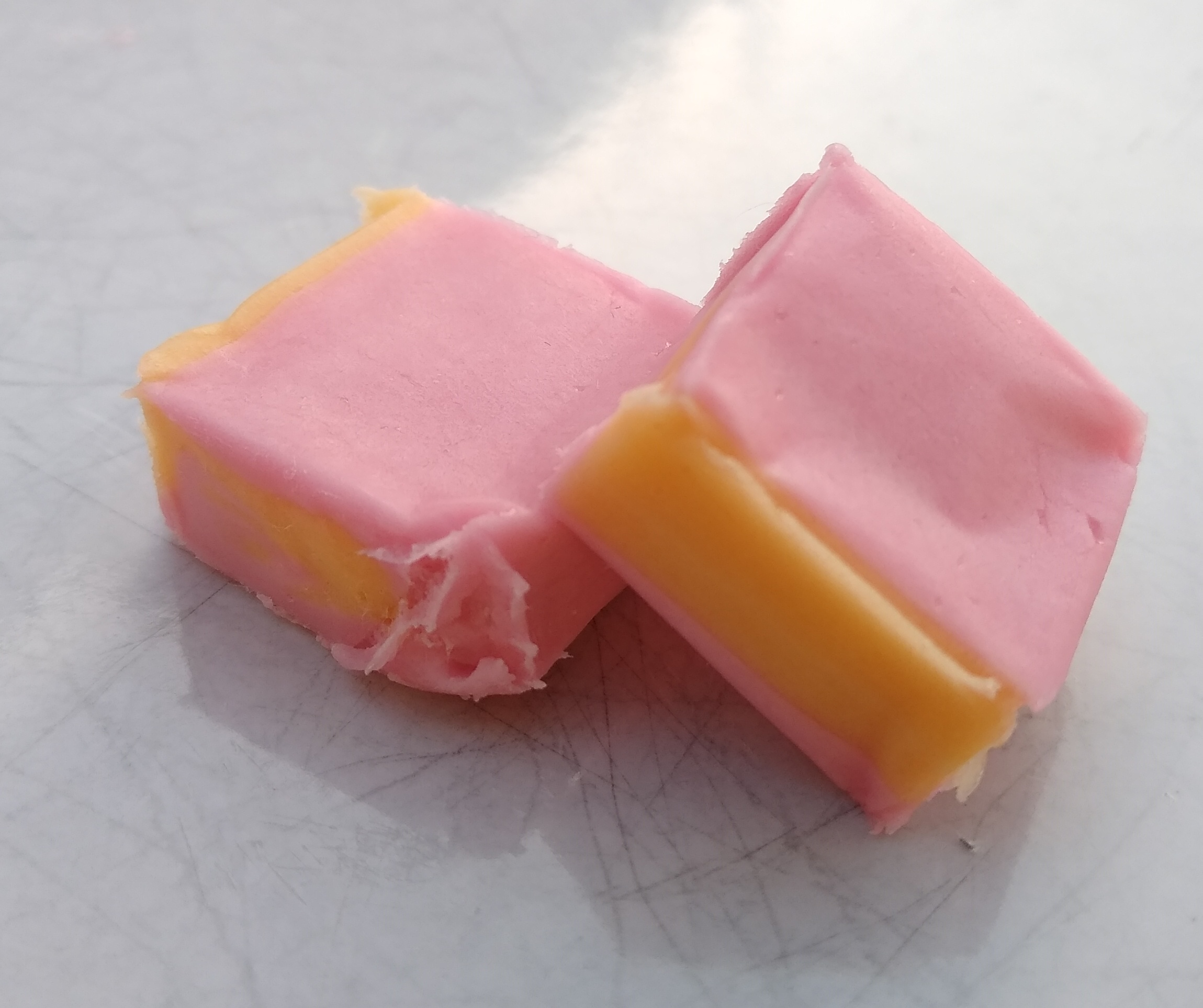
Fruit Salad, one of Barratt's products

Barratt is a confectionery brand in the United Kingdom, known for products including DipDab, Refreshers, Sherbet Fountain, Fruit Salad, Black Jack and Wham.

Barratt & Co. was established in London in 1848 by George Osborne Barratt. By 1906 it was the largest confectionery manufacturer in the world.

It became a limited company in 1909, and was acquired by Bassett's in 1966, then by Cadbury Schweppes in 1989 and by Tangerine Confectionery (since renamed Valeo Confectionery) in 2008.

== History ==
George Osborne Barratt started a confectionery business in 1848 employing one sugar boiler at 32 Shepherdess Walk, Hoxton. The enterprise was successful: it grew rapidly and neighbouring properties were bought up to allow for the expansion. Barratt himself travelled, in his pony and trap, to deliver and promote his products in and around London. Then, his eldest son George (1852–1928), when he was about 17, took over these journeys, and Barratt senior worked large parts of the country for the next 20 years. Part of the company's success was attributable to a product sold as 'stickjaw' toffee – said to have been made accidentally – that was very popular with children.

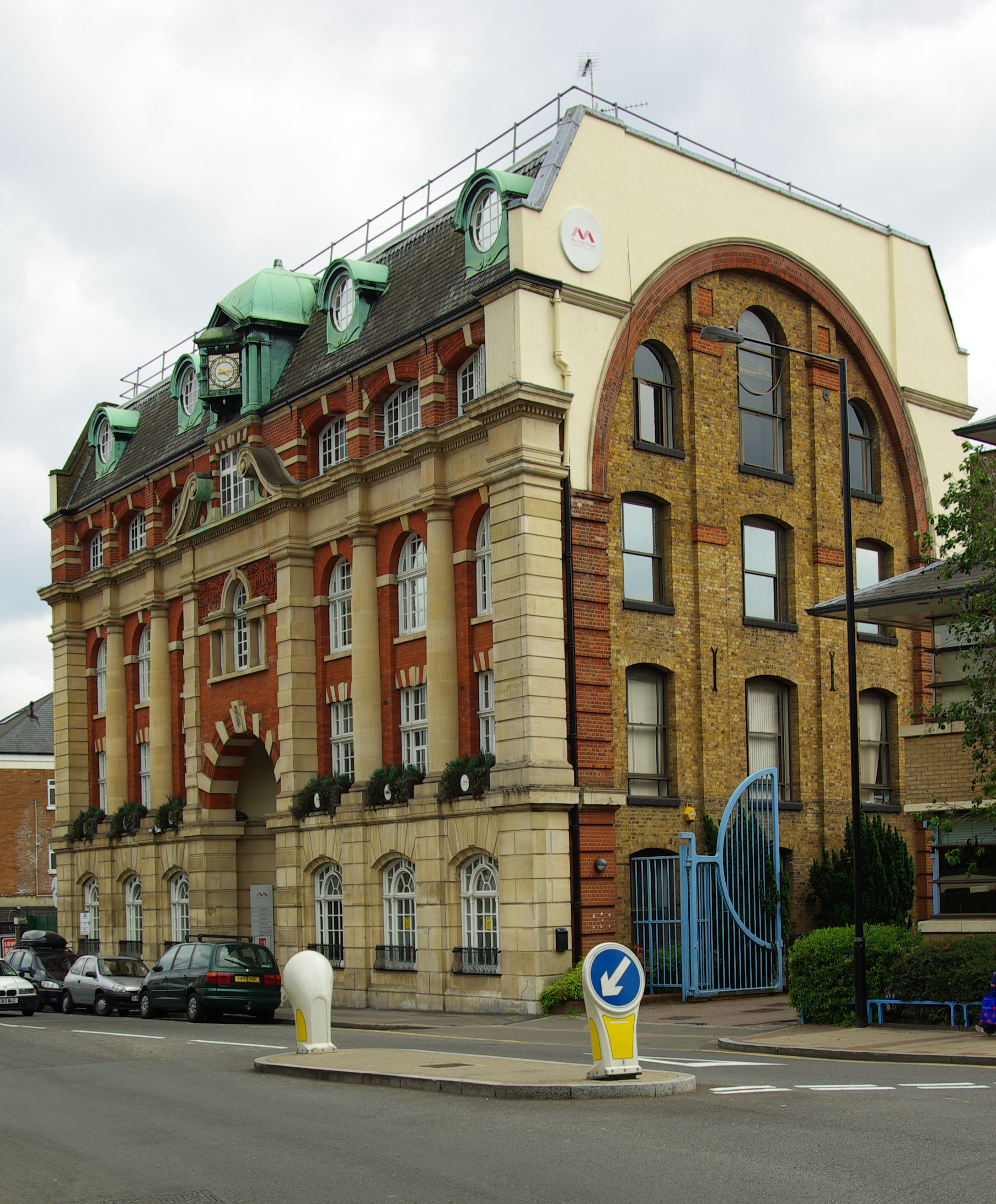
The former offices on Mayes Road

When the company outgrew its Hoxton site it moved to a former piano factory, owned by a Mr Ivory, on Mayes Road, Wood Green, north of London. The first building was ready in 1882. By 1904 eight buildings were in use on nearly 5 acres, despite the setback of a serious fire on 18 October 1899 in which five buildings were destroyed. Two years later there were around 2,000 employees producing 350 tonnes of sweets a week, making Barratts the largest confectionery manufacturer in the world.

Following Barratt's death in 1906 his eldest son, George William (1851–1928), took over as chairman. In 1909, the firm became a limited company, valued at £330,000.

George Osborne's youngest son Albert (1860–1941) was chairman and managing director from 1911 to 1921. He was knighted in 1922 for public services. Sir Albert died on 28 November 1941 at his home (Totteridge Park, Hertfordshire) and is buried in the family grave at Highgate Cemetery.

Barratt & Co. Ltd. was acquired in a friendly takeover by Bassett's in 1966, which in turn was taken over by Cadbury Schweppes in 1989. Since 2008 it has been part of the Tangerine Confectionery portfolio. The Barratt brand was brought back into use in 2018. After a long decline, the company closed its Wood Green site in 1980. Bounded by Coburg Road, Mayes Road and Western Road, the site has since been occupied by The Chocolate Factory.

A selection of old photographs, brochures and letters from former employees is held in the archives of the London Borough of Haringey at Bruce Castle Museum.

=== Staff relations ===
Although there was a week-long strike in September 1890, it involved only about a third of the 600 staff, and was prompted by the Gas Stokers’ union. Generally management-staff relationships were good, and the company's own union was established in the early 1890s as “Barratt & Co.’s and Employees Aid & Protective Union.” Rule 6 stated that membership of any other Trade or Business Union was not permitted. Employees contributed from 1d. to 3d. per week, depending on their wages (from under 12/- to over 18/- ), and received benefits on production of a certificate signed by a doctor.

On several occasions staff expressed their appreciation of the management, e.g. on the occasion of the golden wedding of George and Mrs Barratt in 1899, and in gratitude for an outing to Southend in 1910.

A social club was opened in the 1930s, providing a club room, snooker, darts, dancing and a drama section. The company also provided a surgery with a full-time nurse and visiting doctor. The factory had a chiropodist and a fully equipped dental centre, with a dentist calling once a week.

== Product lines ==
In the early days the product range was mainly “boilings” such as butter, raspberry and ginger toffees. Later it included Almond Rock, Brandy Snaps, Stickjaw, Coffee Almonds, Brandy Nips, Ching Chang Marbles and Coker Tines. Later came Tichborne Rock, a pulled rock in which the figure of Sir Roger Tichborne was incorporated. It was displayed in shop windows with a card saying “Crack the rock where’re you will / You'll find Sir Roger in it still”. It was said to have been the most talked-about line of confectionery Mr Barratt ever invented.

In the 1880s came Yankee Panky (a low-boiled sweet wrapped in wax paper – an industry first), Rose Pastilles and Refresher Sticks.

Black Jack and Fruit Salad appeared in 1920, followed by the famous Sherbet Fountain in 1925. The sherbet was contained in a paper-wrapped cardboard tube with a liquorice “straw” stuck in the top.

By the 1950s Barratt's produced some 200 lines of confectionery, mainly from seven types of manufacture: Rock, Sweet Cigarettes, Sherbet Products, Starch Goods, Liquorice, Boilings and Caramels & Toffees.

Tangerine Confectionery's newly reintroduced Barratt brand portfolio includes DipDab, Refreshers, Nougat, Sherbet Fountain, Fruit Salad, Black Jack, Wham, Refreshers Softies and Fruit Salad Softies. The modern version of the Sherbet Fountain, introduced in 2009, was not to everyone's satisfaction.

== See also ==
- Maynards
- Trebor (confectionery)
- Bassetts
- Fox's Confectionery
- Swizzels
- Rowntrees
