= Extra Strong Mints =

British confectionery brand

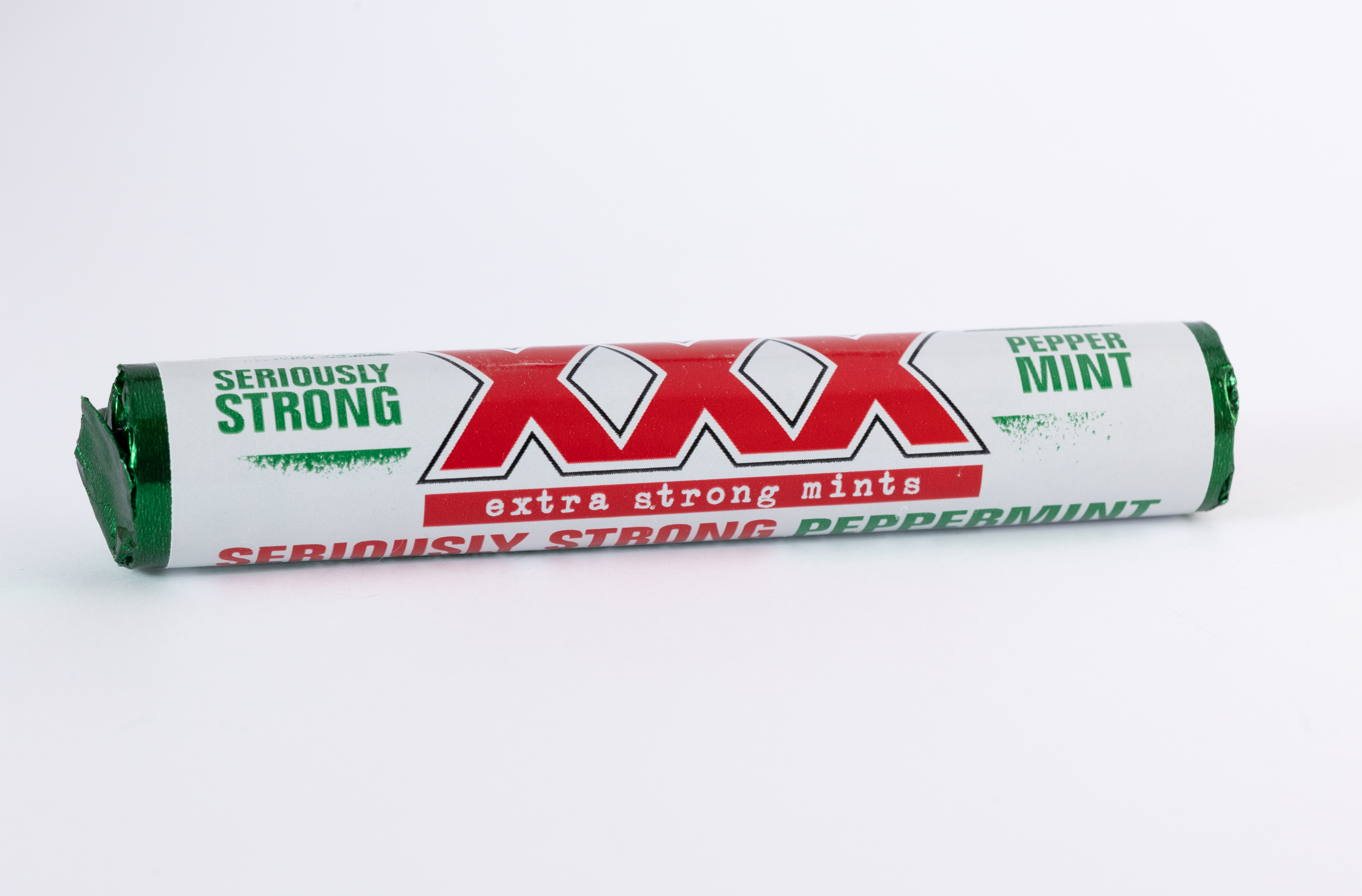
A packet of Extra Strong Mints

Extra Strong Mints is a brand name of mints produced in the United Kingdom.

== History ==
The brand was first made in 1935 by British confectionary manufacturer Trebor. Trebor was sold to Cadbury in 1989.

=== Promotion ===
From the early 1960s, promotional adverts used the slogan "Trebor mints are a minty bit stronger".

In March 1988, the brand gave a £250,000 sponsorship to the England national football team, over three years.

In April 2015, a new series of adverts for the mints, the first in over ten years, was produced by Wieden+Kennedy London.

== Production ==
They are produced in the north of Sheffield, South Yorkshire, England by Trebor, part of Cadbury. Trebor makes around 35 million packs a year at Sheffield.
