= Stenhousemuir =

Coordinates: 56.028°N 03.806°W

Stenhousemuir: Scottish Gaelic: Featha Thaigh nan Clach; Scots: Stennymuir; Stenny or Stenismare
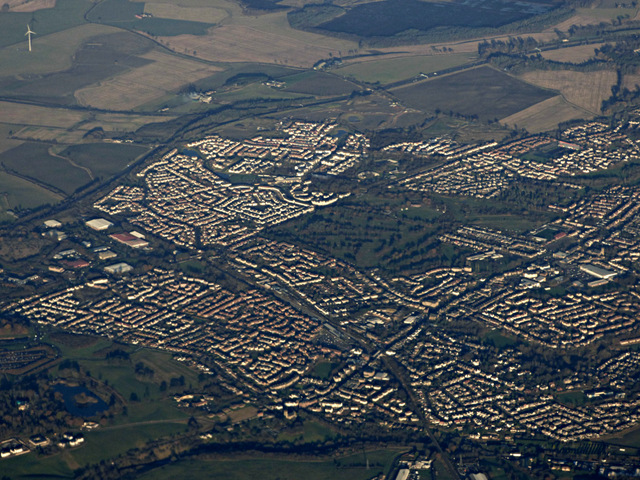
- Larbert and Stenhousemuir

- Location within the Falkirk council area
- Area: 2 3/16 sq mi (5.7 km^{2})
- Population: 9,620 (2020)
  - Density: 4,810/sq mi (1,860/km^{2})
- OS grid reference: NS875831
  - Edinburgh: 24 1/2 mi (39 km) ESE
  - London: 347 mi (558 km) SSE
- Council area: Falkirk
- Lieutenancy area: Stirling and Falkirk
- Country: Scotland
- Sovereign state: United Kingdom
- Post town: LARBERT
- Postcode district: FK5
- Dialling code: 01324
- Police: Scotland
- Fire: Scottish
- Ambulance: Scottish
- UK Parliament: Falkirk
- Scottish Parliament: Falkirk East
- Website: falkirk.gov.uk

Stenhousemuir (/ˌstɛnaʊsˈmjʊər/; Scottish Gaelic: Featha Thaigh nan Clach) is a town in the Central Lowlands of Scotland. It lies within the Falkirk council area of Scotland. The town is two miles (three kilometres) north-northwest of Falkirk and directly adjoins to Larbert in the west, where the nearest rail access is located. The villages of Carron and Carronshore adjoin Stenhousemuir to the east but to a lesser extent. Historically, Stenhousemuir lies with the historic county of Stirlingshire. At the 2001 census it showed that it had a resident population of 10,351 but according to a 2009 estimate this was revised to around 10,190 residents. The combined population of the four localities in 2011 was 24,722, representing about 15% of the Falkirk council area total.

In 2008, a £15 million town centre development scheme was completed and opened which provided a new civic square, a library and large retailing outlets for Stenhousemuir.

== History ==
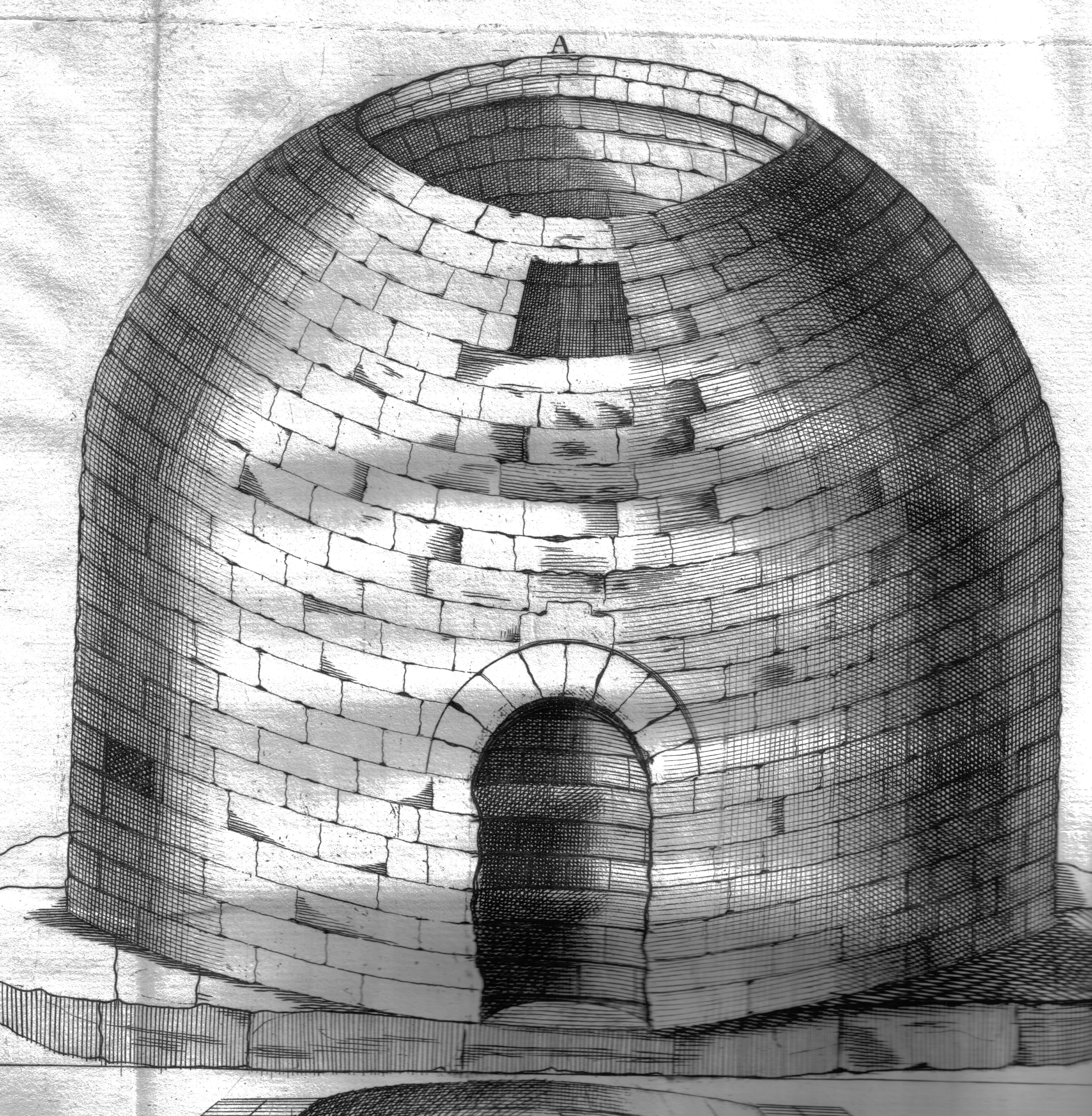
Arthur's O'on from Gordon's book.

The "stone house" from which the village took its name was a Roman building on the north of the Carron River Valley known in later centuries as Arthur's O'on, i.e. King Arthur's oven. It is no longer to be seen, having been demolished to rebuild a dam on the River Carron by Sir Michael Bruce of Stenhouse in 1743. The stones were swept away in a flood soon after. Detailed drawings had been made in the 1720s and a replica was made in 1763 to serve as a dovecote on the roof of the stable block of Penicuik House in Midlothian, and this remains. The site of the original building has been localised to the garden of a modern house on a housing estate, apparently by the American academic Norma Lorre Goodrich (1917–2006).

Stenhousemuir became home to the "Falkirk Tryst" from 1785 - one of the largest gatherings of livestock farmers and buyers from all over Scotland and beyond. After the decline of the Tryst in Crieff, the Falkirk Tryst came to be held more frequently, on the second Tuesdays of August, September and October each year. Thomas Gisbourne in his "Essay on Agriculture" described the Tryst in 1849 as "a scene to which Great Britain, perhaps even the whole world, does not afford a parallel". The Trysts continued until the late 19th century. R.B. Cunninghame Graham's sketch "The Falkirk Tryst" was anthologised in A Hatchment in 1913.

The town was home to the McCowan's toffee factory, established in 1922, who made both traditional toffee and also the Wham Bar.

== Sport ==
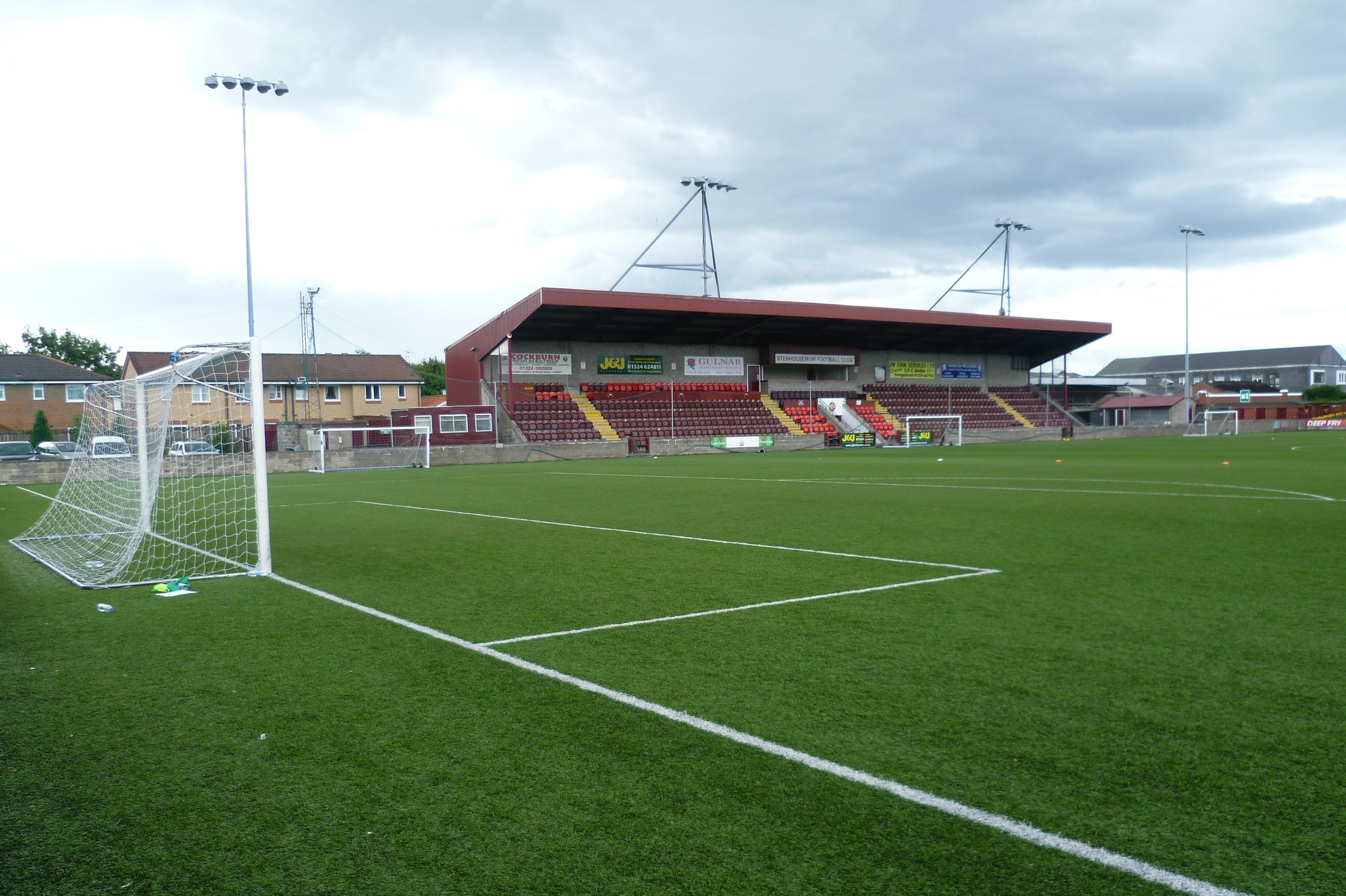
Ochilview Park, home of Stenhousemuir

Stenhousemuir F.C. play football at Ochilview Park and are currently in The Scottish Championship. The Tryst Golf Club, built in 1885, has its clubhouse in Burnhead Road, which is arguably in Larbert.

The Cricket Club has been in existence since 1876. It has produced international players representing Scotland and had a number of notable cricket professionals playing for the club e.g. Abdul Qadir.

== Landmarks ==
Ochilview, Falkirk Tryst Golf Club and Stenhousemuir Cricket Club are all accessible via Tryst Road, leading north out of the village. The street is so called because it was the site of the annual Tryst. On the anniversary of the Tryst in September each year, a travelling funfair comes to the site.

There are four churches in the village: nearer the centre of the village is Larbert East Church with its imposing tower, meanwhile one third of a mile to the east of the village centre on the aptly named Church Street is the Stenhouse and Carron church which is smaller but more distinctive architecturally, designed in 1897 by the firm of John James Burnet. The village is home to a Salvation Army church and community centre housed in a modern building adjacent to Stenhousemuir Primary school. Further west along Main Street lies the Roman Catholic church of Our Lady of Lourdes and St Bernadette. Larbert West church sits just across the old boundary of Burnhead Road between Stenhousemuir and South Broomage.

The shopping area of Stenhousemuir was renovated in 2008. A new library with community area, football pitch and new shops including a 40,000-square-foot (3,700-square-metre) Asda supermarket alongside relocation of a number of existing businesses.

Part of the regeneration resulted in construction of a new community centre and rebuild of the medical centre which provides additional NHS support services to the area.

== Notable people ==
- William McAlpine (1922–2004) – leading tenor of the 1950s and 1960s
- John Walker Sharpe FRSE FIP (1916-1997) physicist
- Jimmy and John Hodge, footballer siblings who both played for Manchester United in the 1910s
- Brian Hardie (born 1950), Essex and Scotland cricketer
- Helen Eadie (1947–2013), Scottish Labour Co-operative politician

== See also ==
- List of places in Falkirk
