= Fox's Confectionery =

Confectionery company based in Britain

Fox's Confectionery Ltd
- Industry: Confectionery
- Founded: 1880
- Headquarters: Pontefract and Blackpool
- Parent: Valeo Foods
- Website: Fox's Confectionery

Fox's Confectionery Ltd is an English confectionery company previously based in Braunstone, Leicester which was founded in 1880. After being acquired by Valeo, the business was merged with Tangerine Confectionery, the Leicester factory closed and the head office functions were moved to offices in Pontefract and Blackpool.

== History ==
The company was set up by Walter Richard Fox as a wholesale grocery and confectionery business in 1880. It started in a Victorian warehouse in Leicester. By 1897 Fox was manufacturing over 100 different confectionery lines.

In 1969, the company was acquired by Mackintosh's, a year prior to the creation of Rowntree Mackintosh when Mackintosh merged with Rowntree's of York. After purchasing Rowntree-Macintosh in 1988, Nestlé sold the Fox's Brand and its Leicester site to Northern Foods in 2001. The company was sold to Big Bear Ltd in 2003. Big Bear Confectionery had sites in Blackburn, Leicester and Nimbus.

Peppy (from peppermint) the polar bear is the original trademark used for Fox's Glacier Mints and was created by Leicester-based artist C. Reginald Dalby, better known for illustrating The Railway Series books by the Rev. W. Awdry.

Fox's Confectionery was acquired by Valeo Foods in 2017. Valeo subsequently merged Fox's Confectionery with Tangerine Confectionery and it was reported that the Leicester factory that had been producing confectionery for 122 years would close at the end of 2019, with the head office moved to Pontefract and Blackpool.

In Indonesia, Fox's candies are currently owned, manufactured and exported to numerous global markets by Savoria (a subsidiary of Djarum Group).

== Products ==
- Fox's "Glacier" Range
  - Fox's Glacier Mints
  - Fox's Glacier Fruits
  - Fox's Glacier Dark
- Paynes Poppets
- XXX Mints
- Just Mints
- Just Brazils
  - Milk Chocolate Just Brazils
  - Dark Chocolate Just Brazils
- Le Bar (discontinued ~1994)
