= CAOBISCO =

European food industry association

Association of the Chocolate, Biscuits and Confectionery industries of Europe
- Association Communautaire des Industries de la Chocolaterie, Biscuiterie
- Formation: 1959
- Purpose: To facilitate the understanding of European decision-makers and stakeholders on the role played by the European chocolate, biscuit & confectionery manufacturers and products in the European economy
- Headquarters: Brussels
- Official language: French

CAOBISCO is the Association of Chocolate, Biscuits and Confectionery (French: Association Communautaire des Industries de la Chocolaterie, Biscuiterie industries of Europe. Created in 1959 in Paris, the association has been based in Brussels since 1985.

CAOBISCO’s role is to facilitate the understanding of European decision-makers and stakeholders on the role played by European chocolate, biscuit, and confectionery manufacturers and products in the European economy. It also acts as a platform of dialogue and communication with European institutions in terms of scientific and regulatory matters, as well as economic and sustainability issues. CAOBISCO members include national associations in Europe as well as direct member companies.

== Activities ==
Areas of activities include:

- Reforms of the Common Agricultural Policy
- Security of quality raw materials supplies
- Trade liberalisation, including tariff and non-tariff barriers
- Responsible and sustainable raw materials sourcing
- Productivity and quality improvements
- Food law
- Food safety
