= Poppets (sweets) =

Confectionery produced in Britain

Paynes Poppets logo

Poppets (formerly and colloquially known as Paynes Poppets) are a confectionery manufactured by Valeo Confectionery, first introduced in 1937 by Payne's fine confectionery in Croydon. When originally introduced, only Raisin Poppets were available. More flavours have since been introduced, including Mint, Toffee and Orange.

== History ==
Poppets are best known for their iconic packaging in small, 40 gram, cardboard boxes. When other confectionery brands moved to plastic wrappers in the 1960s and 1970s, Poppets retained their traditional boxes. The box has a small hatch in one corner that can be torn open to dispense the sweets one at a time, this 'popping out' having given them their original name. The non-rustling packaging, and the ability to dispense single sweets in the dark, made them a popular snack in cinemas which remain one of their most popular sales outlets.

George Payne & Co. began production in the East End of London, before moving to Croydon Road, Beddington in Surrey in the 1930s. In 1998, it was acquired by Northern Foods. In 2001 the closure of the Croydon Road factory was announced, as part of a deal by Northern Foods to take over the Fox's factory in Leicester from Nestlé and relocate production of Poppets there.

The box was redesigned in 2006 with new printed designs, themed with other British design icons such as the Mini and a NatWest Piggy Bank.

In 2011, ten million Poppets were being consumed each week.

The Leicester factory was sold in 2020 and production of Poppets was relocated to York.

== Flavours and formats ==
The orange and mint varieties are made of a fondant centre with a dark chocolate covering, while the strawberry fondant and other varieties have a milk chocolate coating. A salted fudge caramel variety was made available in 2021.

Whilst 120/130 gram sharing sized bags can now be bought, Poppets remain best known for their boxes. Larger boxes are also available.

== See also ==
- Junior Mints (American equivalent)
- List of confectionery brands
- Revels - a similar confectionary by Mars Inc
