= Fox's Glacier Mints =

British brand of mint candy

Fox's Glacier Mints

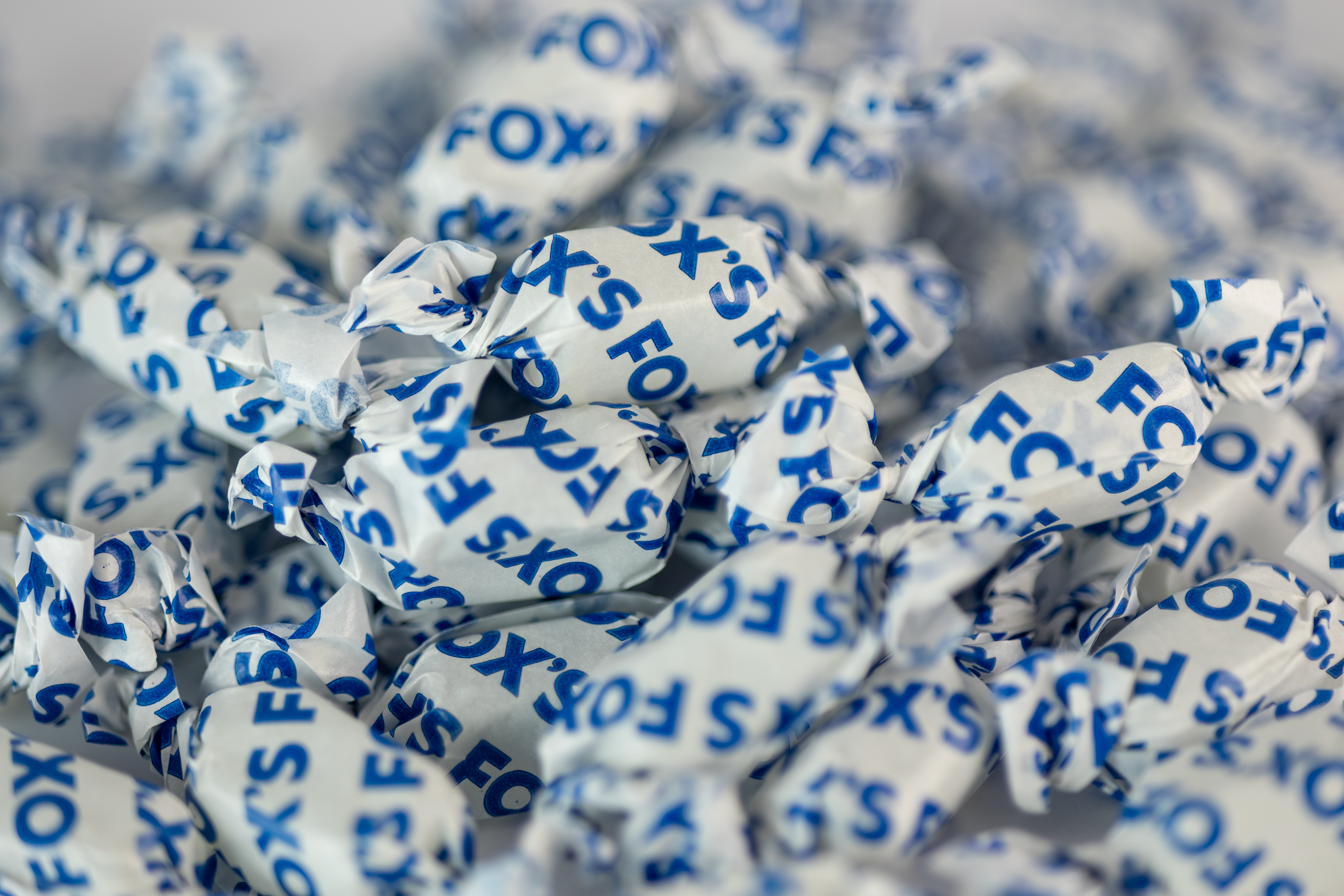
Individually wrapped Fox's Glacier Mints

Fox's Glacier Mints are a brand of boiled mint sold in the United Kingdom since 1918 and now manufactured by Valeo Confectionery.

== History ==
=== Background ===
Walter Richard Fox, the founder of Fox's Confectionery, originally manufactured sweets as part of the Joyce and Fox partnership, but this was dissolved in 1897. Fox continued to make confectionery, and was joined in 1914 by his son Eric.

=== Product creation and development ===
Glacier Mints were first created in 1918 by Eric Fox. To begin with, they were called Acme Clear Mint Fingers, but this was changed to Glacier Mints in 1919, apparently on the advice of Eric Fox's wife. From 1928, the mints have been individually wrapped.

Since 1922, the mints have been branded with Peppy the polar bear, who was designed by Clarence Reginald Dalby. As part of an advertising campaign. Fox's commissioned a taxidermist to shoot and stuff a real polar bear for display purposes; the stuffed bear was shown at public events until in 1969, upon Fox's acquisition by Rowntree's, it was retired and replaced by a cartoon. Peppy is typically depicted as though standing on one of the mints. Glacier Mints resemble miniature blocks of ice and are clear and translucent. Companion products are Fox's Glacier Fruits (launched 1956) and Fox's Glacier Dark (launched 2002).

The mint's centenary year in 2018 was marked with the release of two new products: spearmint-flavour mints and a selection of fruit flavoured sweets as part of a tropical selection.
