= Wham Bar =

Sugary chew bar made in the United Kingdom

The Wham Bar is a confectionery bar produced by Tangerine Confectionery and sold in the United Kingdom and Ireland.

They are thin chew bars with coloured pieces of sherbet inside. Wham Bars are available in a range of flavours including Original (Raspberry), Strawberry, Cola, Brew (a similar flavour to that of Irn-Bru), Extreme Super Sour (Blackcurrant), Sour Apple and Sour Cherry. Most flavours are available in Standard, Mega and Mini sizes.

== History ==
Wham Bars were introduced in the early 1980s by McCowan's, a Scottish confectionery manufacturer based in Stenhousemuir. At the peak of their popularity, sales of Wham Bars were 30 million per year.

In 2009, Wham XTRM Sherbet Dips were added to the range. Each packet includes a blackcurrant lollipop and a sherbet dip. In 2010, the 'Luscious Strawberry' flavour Glam Bar was introduced.

On 21 September 2011 it was announced that New McCowans Ltd, the makers of Wham Bars, were going into administration.

On 14 October 2011 it was announced that the Wham Bar and Highland Toffee brands had been bought by Tangerine Confectionery.
