= Fruit Salad (confectionery) =

Brand of confectionery

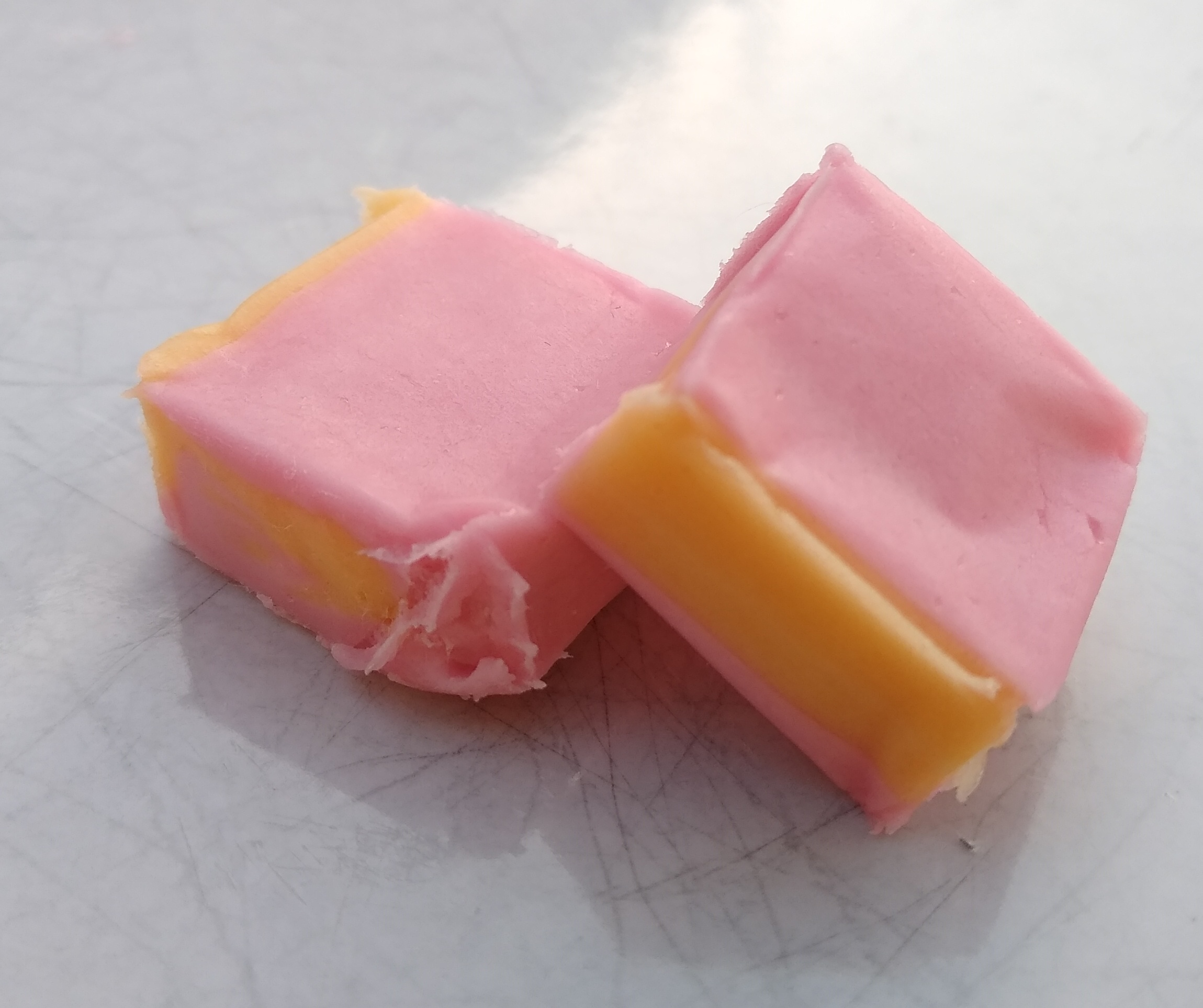
- Two pieces of Fruit Salad
- Product type: Sugar candy; Taffy (candy)
- Current owner: Valeo Confectionery
- Country: England
- Website: valeoconfectionery.com

Fruit Salad is a type of "raspberry & pineapple flavour chew" according to its packaging. It is a chewy confectionery. Fruit Salad is manufactured by Barratt in Spain.

While still manufactured under Tangerine Confectionery, Fruit Salad chews were rebranded from Barratt to 'Candy Land' and the packaging, most notably the outer box, had been redesigned. They have since reverted to the Barratt brand.

From 2019 the fruit salad sweet no longer contains gelatine and is suitable for vegetarians.

== Nutrition facts ==
Nutritional information:

- Per 100 g - energy 1680 kJ (395 kcal), protein 0.8g, carbohydrate 84.1 g, fat 6.1 g.
- Per chew - energy 50 kJ (10 kcal), protein 0 g, carbohydrate 2.4 g, fat 0.2 g.

Ingredients: glucose syrup, sugar, hydrogenated vegetable fat, citric acid, emulsifier (soya lecithin), flavourings, colours (E104, E124, E122).

Each chew weighs 2.6 g, and each pack contains 15 chews.

== See also ==
- Black Jack (confectionery)
