= Valeo Confectionery =

British confectionery company

Valeo Foods UK

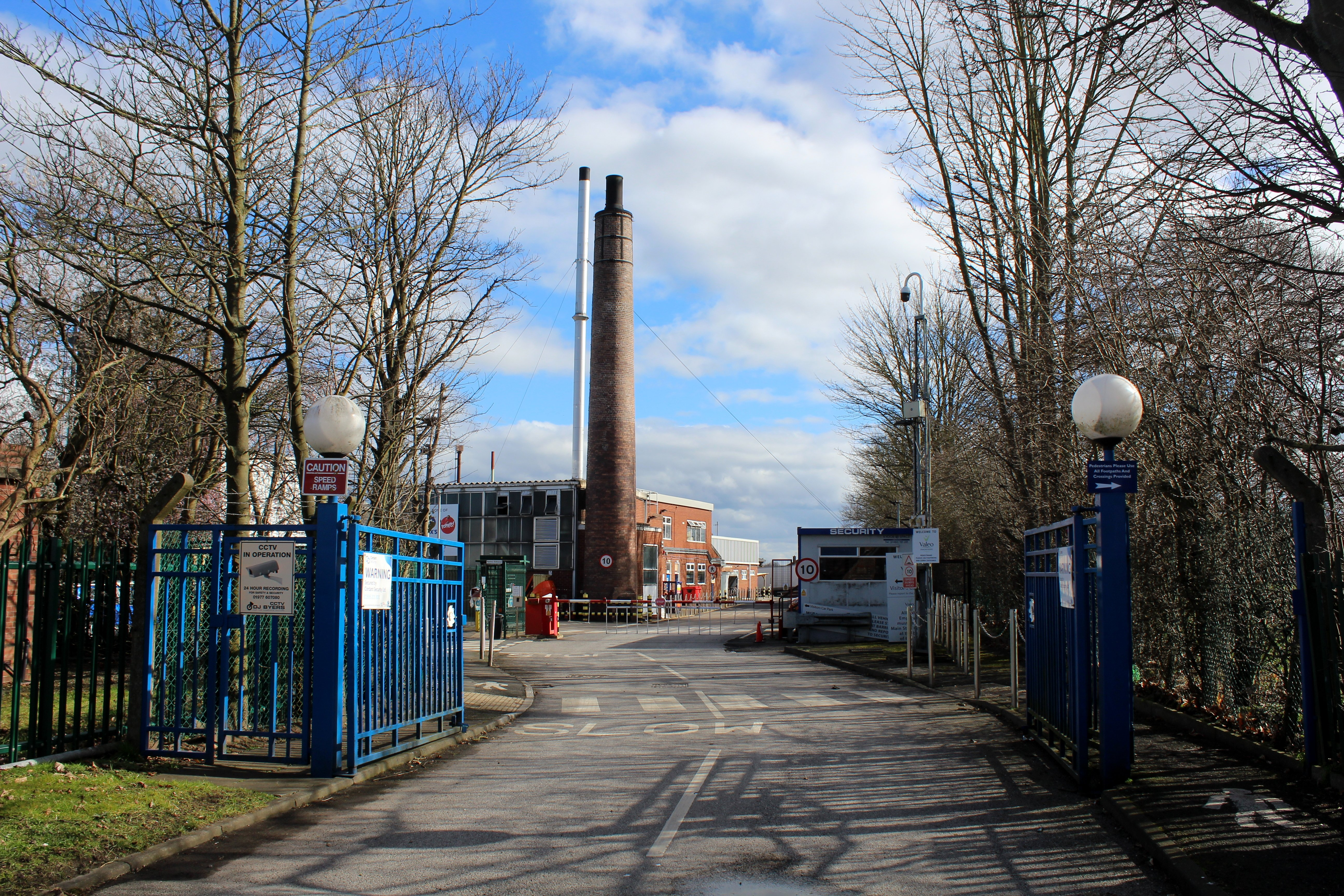
- Formerly: Orbitpalm Limited (June–October 1986); Sk Daintee Holdings Limited (1986–2000); Toms Confectionery Limited (2000–2006); Tangerine Confectionery Limited (2006–2019)
- Type: Private
- Industry: Snacks
- Founded: 4 June 1986; 40 years ago
- Headquarters: Leeds, England
- Number of locations: 9 manufacturing plants
- Revenue: £150,000,000
- Owner: Valeo Foods
- Number of employees: 1,500 (2009)
- Website: valeofoods.co.uk

Valeo Foods UK (formerly known as Valeo Confectionery, Valeo Snackfoods, Tangerine Confectionery Limited and Toms Confectionery Limited) is a British confectionery company with its headquarters in Leeds, West Yorkshire. Since 2006, it had grown through acquisitions into one of the largest independent confectionery companies in Europe before acquisition by Valeo Foods and the fourth largest sweet maker in the United Kingdom. As of 2026, the company has ten manufacturing plants: Blackburn, Blackpool, Cleckheaton, Gateshead, Heanor, Norwich, Snetterton, Wallingford and York.

== History ==
=== Tangerine Confectionery ===
In January 2006, Toms Confectionery changed its name to Tangerine Confectionery and altered its branding following the purchase of the company by a new management team from Toms International of Denmark. The UK arm of Tom's had been created through the acquisition of three traditional confectionery companies, Taveners, Daintee and Parrs, over a ten-year period, between 1992 and 2001.

Originally the company had been mainly an own-label supplier in England. The company acquired the Taveners, Daintee and Parrs businesses from Toms of Denmark later in January 2006. In April it was voted the best own-label confectionery supplier in the UK by The Grocer magazine. In August, the company acquired the confectionery arm of Blackpool-based Burton's Foods and so increase turnover of the company to £60 million, making it the largest independent confectionery company in the UK.

In January 2008, the company purchased Yorkshire based Monkhill Confectionery from Cadbury plc in a £58 million deal, with factories in Cleckheaton, Pontefract and York as well as a distribution centre in Holmewood, North East Derbyshire. The purchase included the Barratts, Sharps of York, Jameson's, Trebor Basset Mints, Butterkist and Pascall lines. Two months later Tangerine claimed there were no plans to close its York factory, despite ordering workers to stay at home in Easter week.

Two months later, staff in Blackpool voted in favour of industrial action after turning down a 2.5% pay offer.

In April 2009 the company was ranked 23rd in the PricewaterhouseCoopers Profit Track 100, published by The Sunday Times, and was the highest North West entry in the table, which lists the 100 private UK's companies with the fastest growing profits. In August it received a quality Halal Seal of Approval, from the Halal Food Authority, for 150 products within its Barratt, MOJO, Princess and Taveners Proper Sweets ranges

In March 2010, the company was found guilty of two counts of breaching Health and Safety laws, following the death of an employee at its Poole, Dorset factory. A fine of £300,000 for each count plus costs was imposed. In 2012, it was announced that the factory would close in 2013.

2012 saw the acquisition of Smith Kendon, manufacturer of York Fruits jelly sweets.

On 5 February 2013 the company was delisted by the Halal Food Authority.

In 2014 Tangerine announced the closure of its Clifton Road factory in Blackpool. It said its other Blackpool site in Vicarage Lane would remain open.

=== Valeo Foods ===
In August 2018, Valeo Foods announced completion of its acquisition of Tangerine Confectionery. In December 2019, the company's name was changed to Valeo Confectionery.

In March 2024, Valeo Foods announced the closure of its Liverpool factory. It subsequently closed down in March 2025.

In October 2025, the company announced plans to shut the Pontefract site. It subsequently closed in July 2026.

== Operations ==
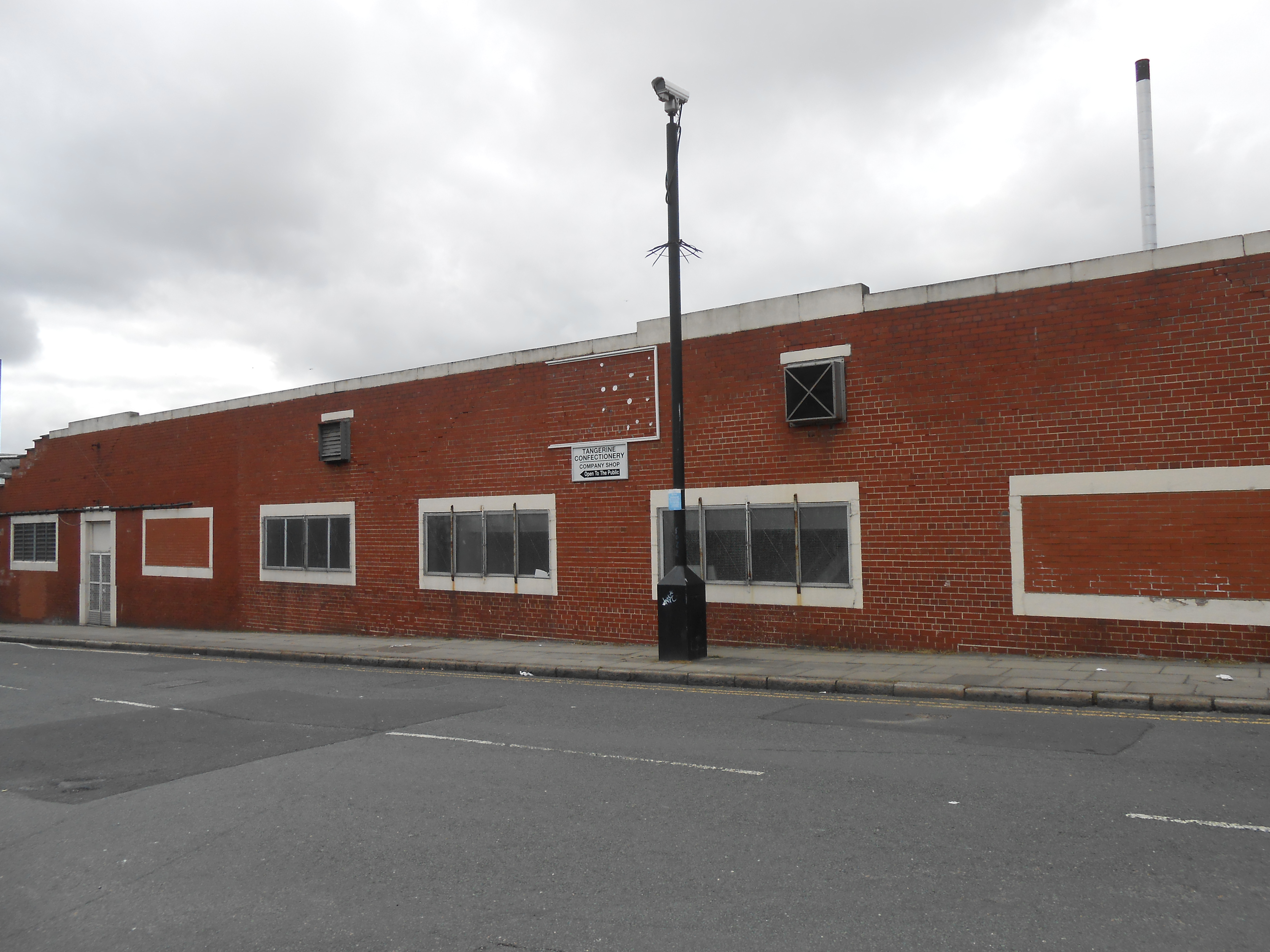
The Tangerine Confectionery factory in Liverpool, 2013

Tangerine Confectionery (now Valeo Foods) had factories in Blackburn, Blackpool, Cleckheaton, Pontefract and York. Its head office, originally in Blackpool, was in Pontefract in West Yorkshire.

== Brands and products ==
Brand	Products
Anthon Berg	Liqueurs, chocolate creams, marzipan fruits and specialist chocolate bars
Anglo Bubbly	Bubble gum
Barker and Dobson	Mints, Mint Humbugs, Everton Mints
Barratt (briefly known as Candyland)	Black Jacks, Bruiser, Candy sticks, Sherbet Fountain, Dip Dab, Catherine Wheels, Dolly Mixture, Jungle Mix, Dew Drops, Flumps, Frosties and Fizzy Frosties, Fruit Salad, Gums, Jelly Babies, Milk bottles, Milk Teeth, Nougat, Refreshers, Refreshers Gums, Refreshers Roll, Mini Eggs.
Fox's Glacier Mints and Fruits
Jamesons	Caramels, Chocolate peanuts, Chocolate brazils, Chocolate raisins, Raspberry Ruffles
Lion	Fruit Salad, Fruit Pastilles, Licorice Gums, Wine Gums, Sports Mixture, Midget Gems
Mojo	Chews (banana, cola, strawberry, spearmint, orange), lollies, jellies
Poppets
Princess	Pink and white marshmallows, Marshmallow smoothies (banana+strawberry & strawberry+mango)
Sharps of York	Toffee, Fudge
Smith Kendon	York Fruits
Squirrel	Cherry lips, Floral gums
Hobo's	Liquorice Chews With Fruit Sides [Re-released at Christmas 2013 alongside glee's]
Taveners	Coconut mushrooms, Toffee bon bons, Eclairs, Rhubarb and custard, Red and black gums, Blackcurrant and liquorice, Barley sugars, Toasted teacakes, Chocolate limes, American hard gums, Fruit pastilles, Mint humbugs, Wine gums, Assorted liquorice, Jelly Babies, Dairy toffee, Strawberry bon bons, lemon and strawberry sherbets, lemon bon bons, dolly mixture

== See also ==
- List of confectionery brands
