= Finnish cuisine =

Culinary tradition

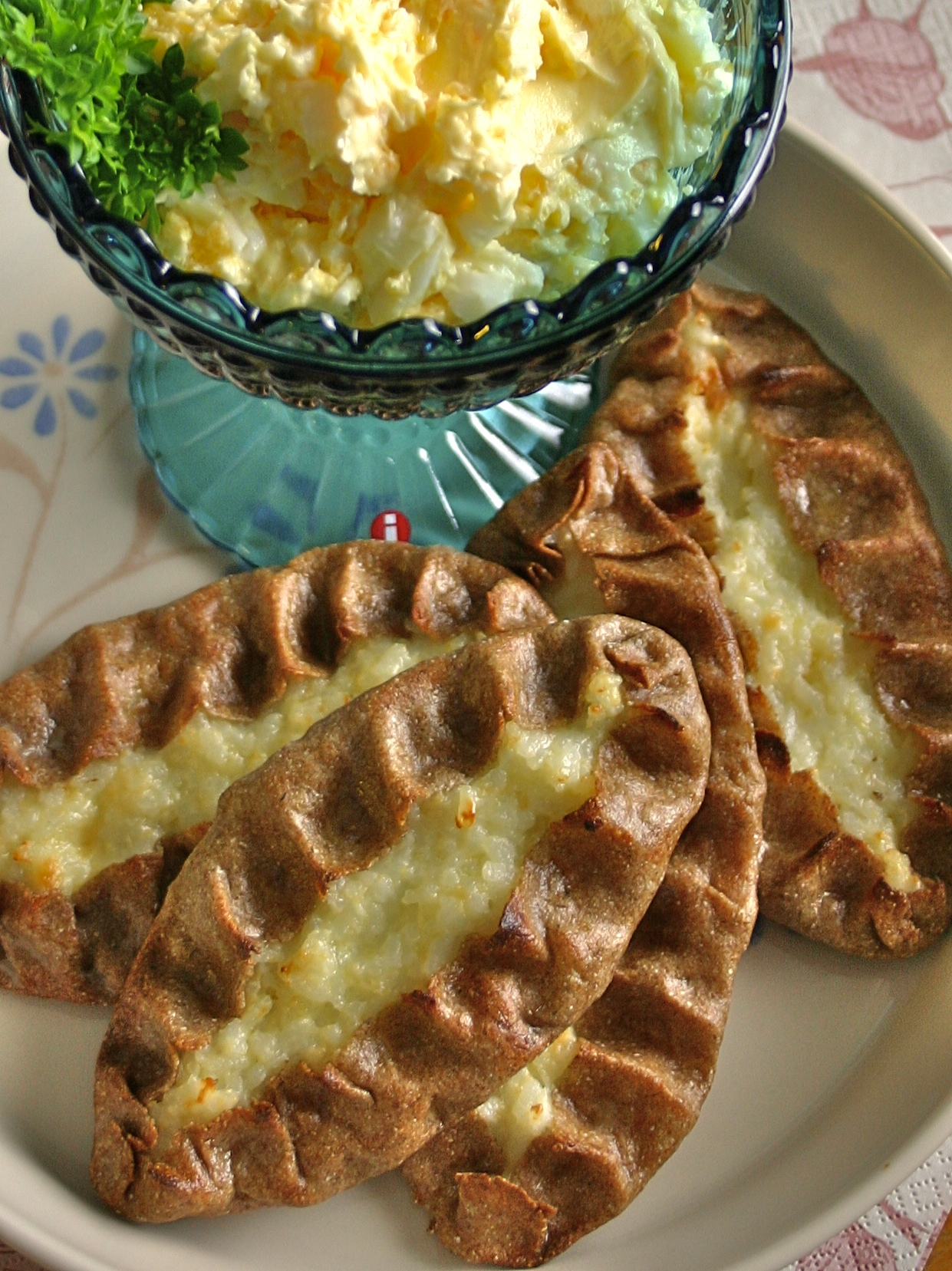
Karelian pasty (karjalanpiirakka) is a traditional Finnish dish made from a thin rye crust with a filling of barley or rice. Butter, often mixed with boiled egg (egg butter or munavoi), is spread over the hot pastries before eating.

Finnish cuisine is notable for generally combining traditional country fare and haute cuisine with contemporary continental-style cooking. Fish and meat (usually pork, beef or reindeer) play a prominent role in traditional Finnish dishes in some parts of the country, while the dishes elsewhere have traditionally included various vegetables and mushrooms. Evacuees from Karelia contributed to foods in other parts of Finland in the aftermath of the Continuation War.

Finnish foods often use wholemeal products (rye, barley, oats) and berries (such as bilberries, lingonberries, cloudberries, and sea buckthorn). Milk and its derivatives like buttermilk are commonly used as food, drink or in various recipes. Various turnips were common in traditional cooking, but were replaced with the potato after its introduction in the 18th century.

== Characteristics ==
The way of life and culture of Finns was mainly based on agriculture already at prehistoric times. However, in the harsh and cold environment, agriculture was neither a very effective nor secure way of life, so getting food from nature has often been an important secondary livelihood. When crops failed, it might have been the only way to survive. Also, while farms mainly produced crops like turnips, and often families had only some farm animals to get milk products and meat, hunting and especially fishing were important ways to get more protein. Large-scale meat production and therefore meat as a daily food started to emerge only at the beginning of the 20th century, after periods of malnutrition in the 19th century caused by failed crops.

In former times, the country's harsh climate meant that fresh fruit and vegetables were largely unavailable for at least nine months of the year, leading to a heavy reliance on staple tubers (initially turnip, later potato), dark rye bread and fermented dairy products, occasionally enlivened with preserved fish and meat. Traditionally, very few spices other than salt were available, and fresh herbs like dill and chives were limited to the summer months. Many Finnish traditional dishes are prepared by stewing them for a long time in an oven, which produces hearty but bland fare. Forests and lakes were historically a major source of food, and produce from forests currently accounts for the distinctive traits in Finnish cuisine. The simplicity of traditional Finnish food has been turned into an advantage by shifting the emphasis to freshness. Modern Finnish restaurateurs now blend high-quality Finnish products with continental cooking techniques. This approach helped Helsinki's Chez Dominique to receive two Michelin stars in 2003. The restaurant closed in 2013.

Internationalization brought imported goods. As pasta, pizza, kebab, and hamburgers were integrated into Finnish menus, they displaced some traditional everyday dishes like kaalilaatikko (cabbage casserole), and herring fillets, which some consider inferior. As of the 20th century, when the majority of Finnish women entered the workforce, many traditional dishes that require long preparation time are reserved for holidays.

Even with modern agriculture and transportation, food remains expensive in Finland relative to other European countries. This is notwithstanding the effect of accession to the European Union in 1995. The consequent elimination of trade barriers led prices of products like grains, meat, and milk to drop as much as 50%. Before that, heavy taxes and outright bans on imports that competed with local produce severely limited the availability of foreign or unseasonal food. Nowadays Finnish supermarkets and restaurants provide a variety of food from all over the world.

Finnish cuisine is very similar to Swedish cuisine. Swedish dishes like Janssons frestelse (janssoninkiusaus), pyttipannu, and gravlax (graavilohi) are common in Finland. The overarching difference is the Finns' preference for unsweetened foods. For example, while traditional Swedish rye bread includes plenty of syrup and spices, Finnish rye bread is unsweetened, even bitter. Finnish cuisine also bears some resemblance to German and Russian cuisines. Sausages and buttered bread (like Butterbrot), and kiisseli (kissel) and lihapiirakka (cf. pirozhki) are similar to their respective German and Russian counterparts. Finnish recipes, however, tend to favour fresh ingredients over canned or pickled foods, as fresh vegetables, fish, and meat are available throughout the year.

== Finnish food ==
=== Meats from Finland ===
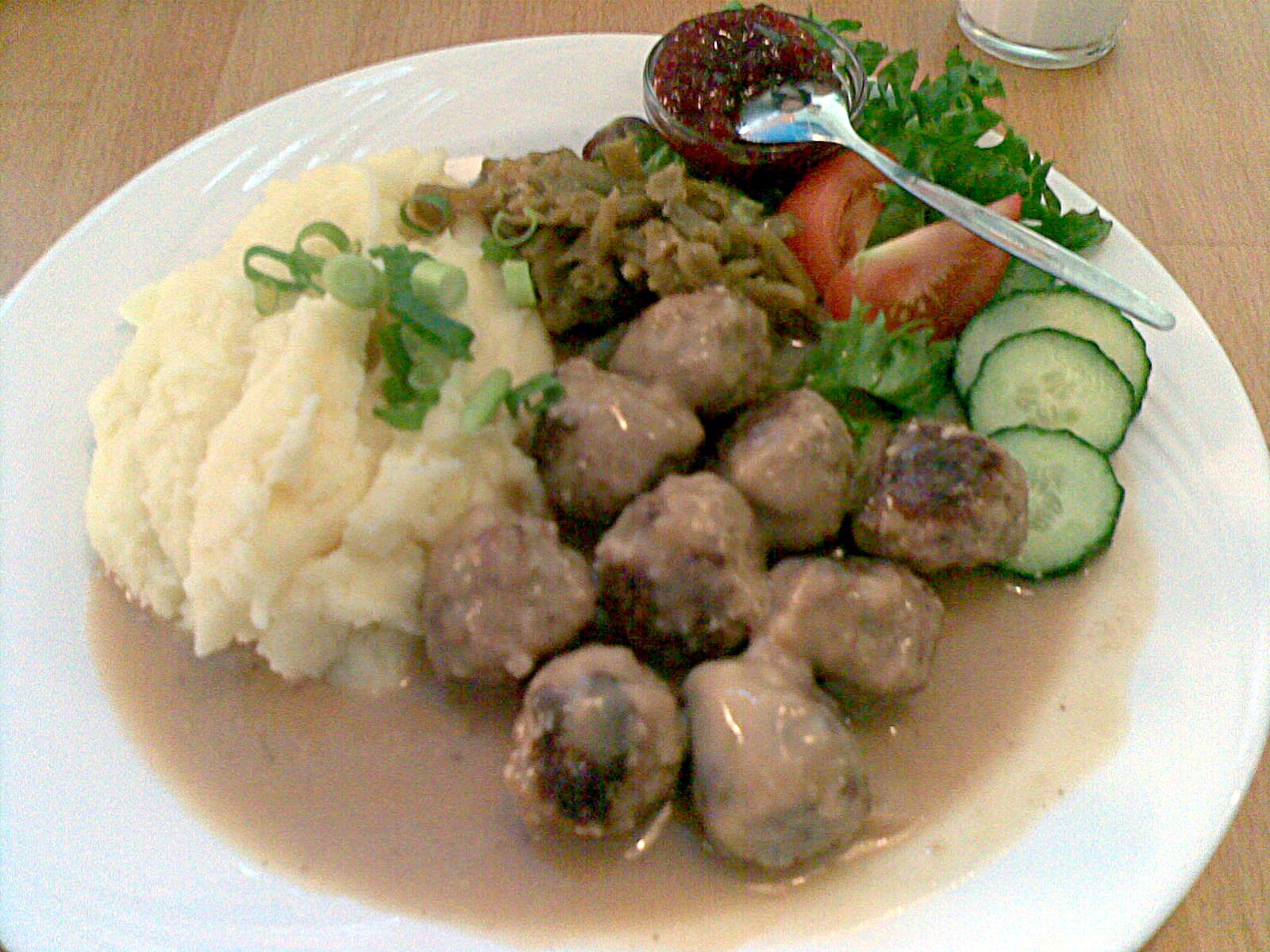
Beef and pork meatballs (lihapullat), served with mashed potatoes, creamy roux sauce, salad, and lingonberry jam

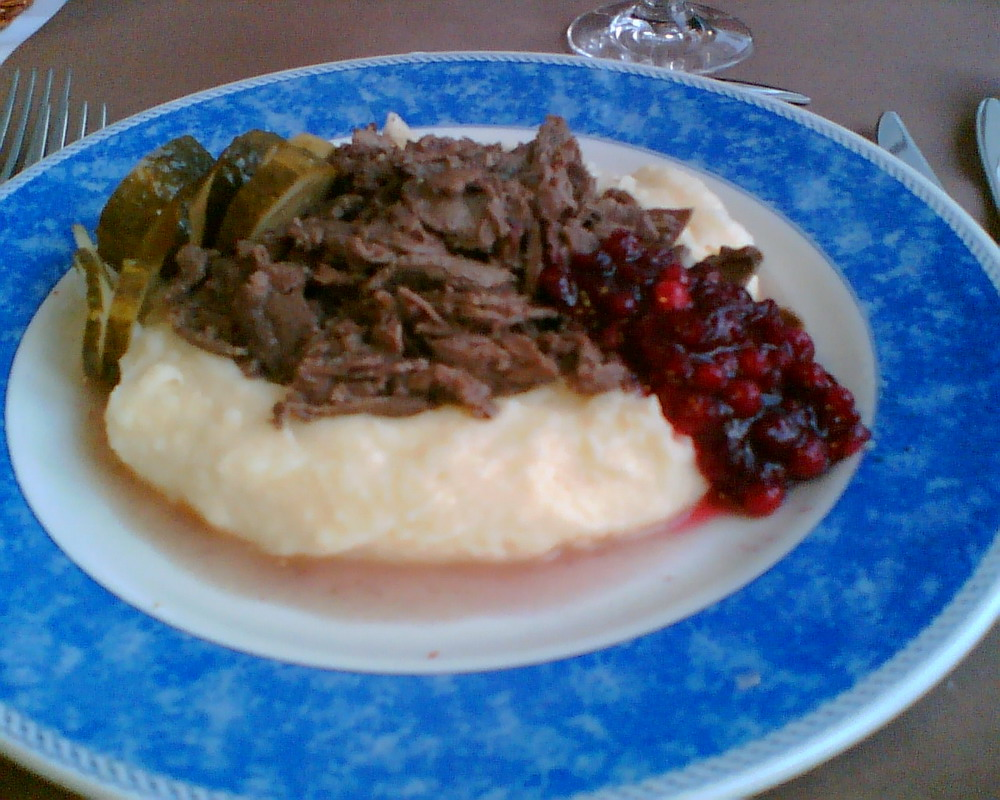
Reindeer stew (poronkäristys), a Lapland favourite, served in a potato mash bowl with lingonberries

The most popular meats in Finland are pork (33.5 kg/year/person in 2005), beef (18.6 kg), and chicken (13.3 kg). Approximately one third of this is eaten as sausage (makkara), which is mostly made from pork but often mixes in other meats as well. Horse meat, lamb and reindeer make up a small portion of the total meat consumption, but they are widely available.

In addition to domesticated animals, there are long traditions of hunting and fishing in Finland. The hunters focus on deer, moose and bear, but small game such as hare, duck and grouse are popular. Approximately 70,000–80,000 moose are culled yearly, producing significant amounts of meat. Due to very strict food hygiene regulations, moose meat is mainly consumed within households and is rarely obtainable in restaurants.

=== Berries ===
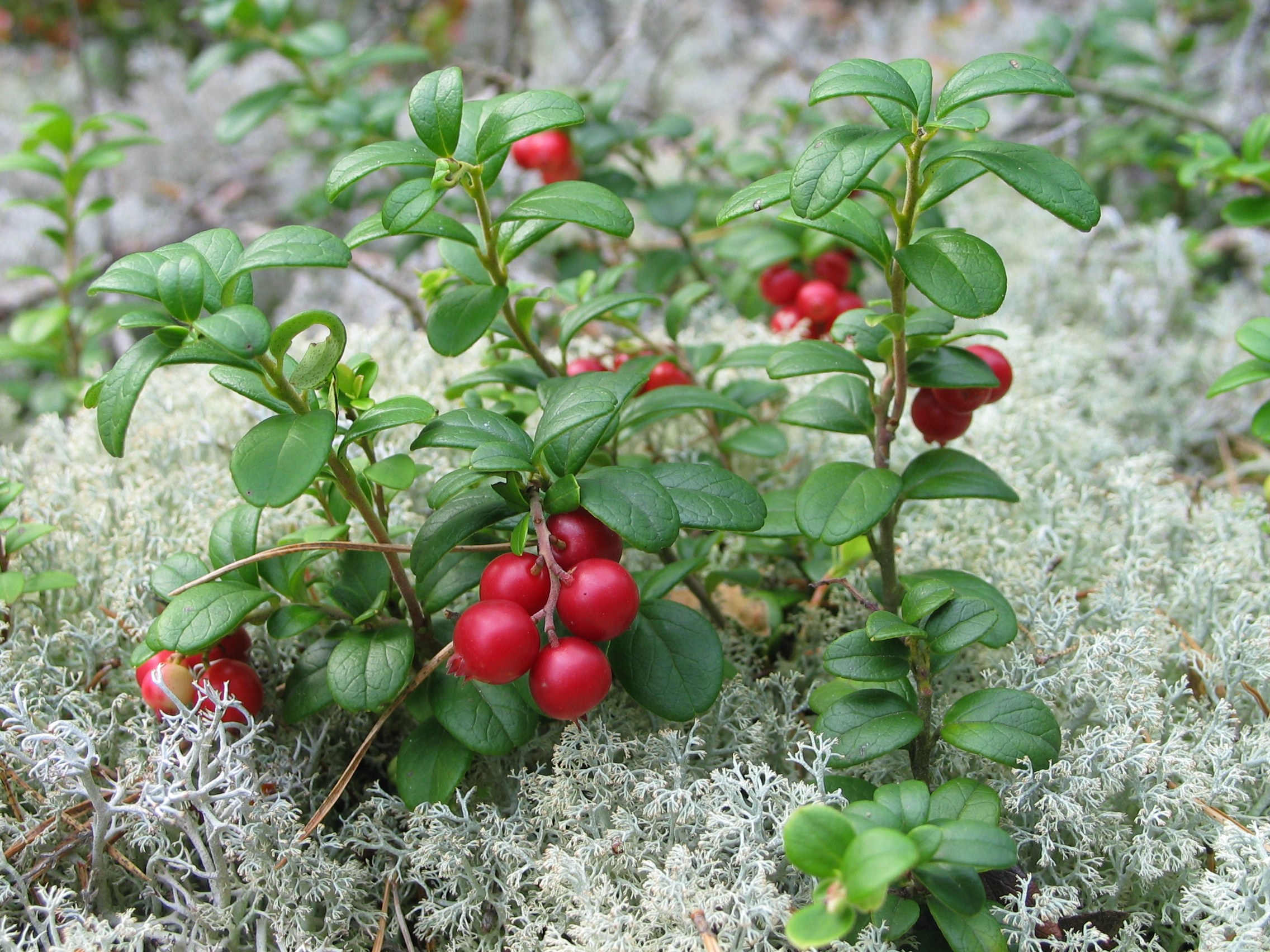
Lingonberries (known in Finnish as puolukka) are common throughout Finland.

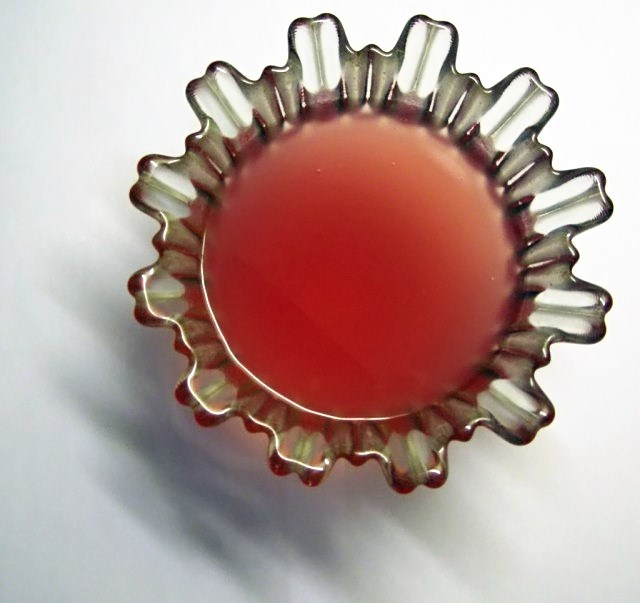
Typical kiisseli

Arctic wild berries are distinctively featured in Finnish cuisine with their strong flavor and high nutrient content. Traditionally, they were eaten fresh in summer and dried at other times of year. It is still quite common to go picking berries straight from the forests – in fact, wild berries are free to pick in any forest, state or private, except in close proximity to dwellings. Wild raspberries (vadelma), bilberries (mustikka) and lingonberries (puolukka) are found in almost every part of Finland, while cloudberries (lakka), cranberries (karpalo), arctic brambles (mesimarja) and sea buckthorns (tyrni) grow in more limited areas. The intensely flavored wild strawberry (metsämansikka) is a seasonal delicacy decorating cakes, served alone, with cream, or with ice cream. Farmed strawberry (mansikka) is also very common.

Today, berries are no longer dried for winter consumption but usually frozen. They may be used as ingredients, or eaten on their own, for example, with porridge and sugar. Kiisseli (a sweet soup of berry juice and berries thickened with potato starch) is a common dessert. Homemade berry juices and jams are common, especially among older people. While berries are most often used for desserts, they are also served with meat, especially the sour lingonberry relish.

Bilberry kissel (mustikkakiisseli) and pie (mustikkapiirakka), made from wild bilberries (Vaccinium myrtillus), are traditional Finnish desserts. Bilberries are frequently used in Finnish cuisine, both as an ingredient, such as bilberry pie, and also served with cream or ice cream. They are often used on top of viili and other yogurt-type dishes.

=== Fish ===
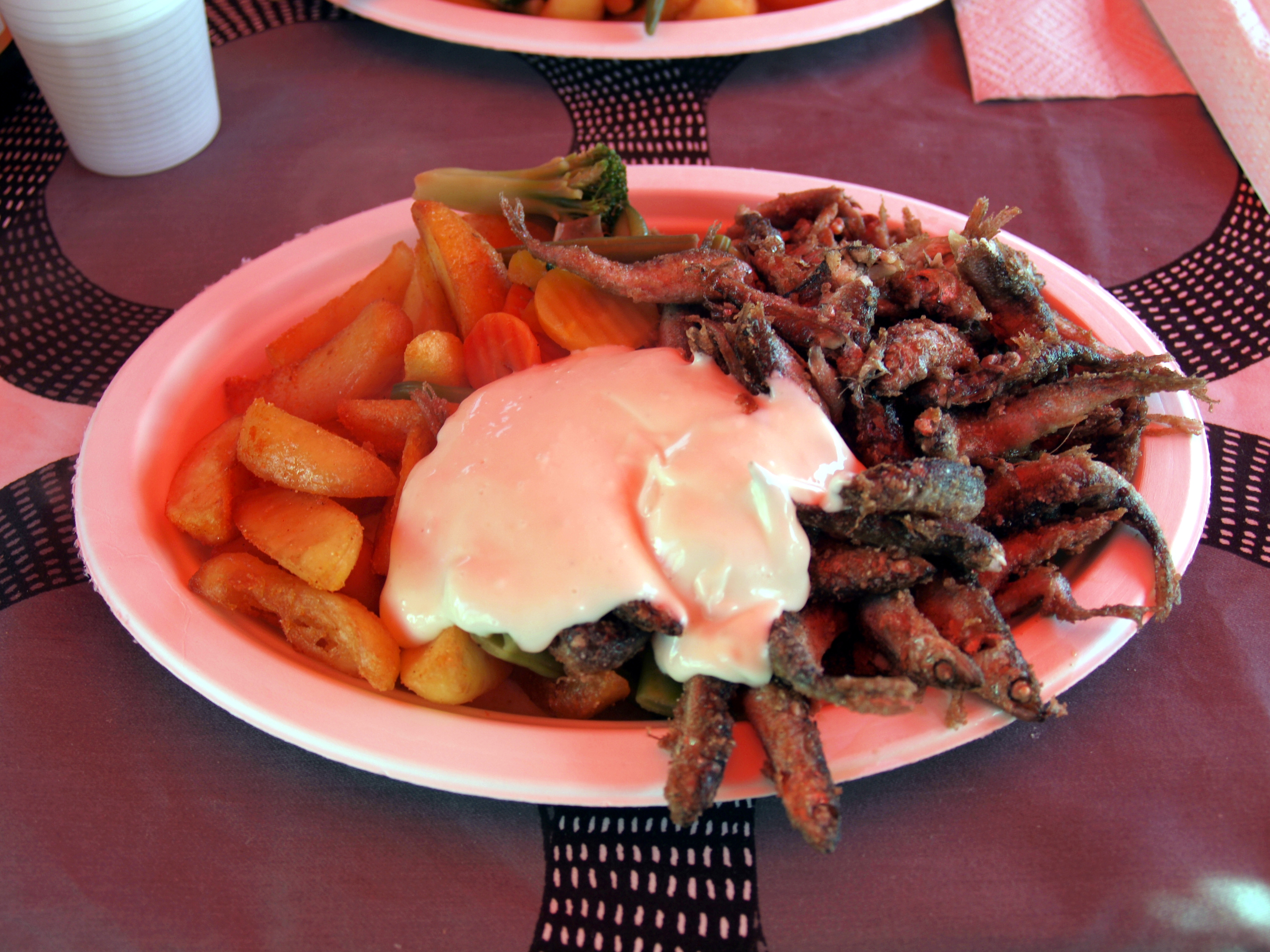
Fried vendace (Coregonus albula) is a traditional summertime dish in Finland. The fish are fried, served, and eaten whole, usually accompanied with garlic sauce.

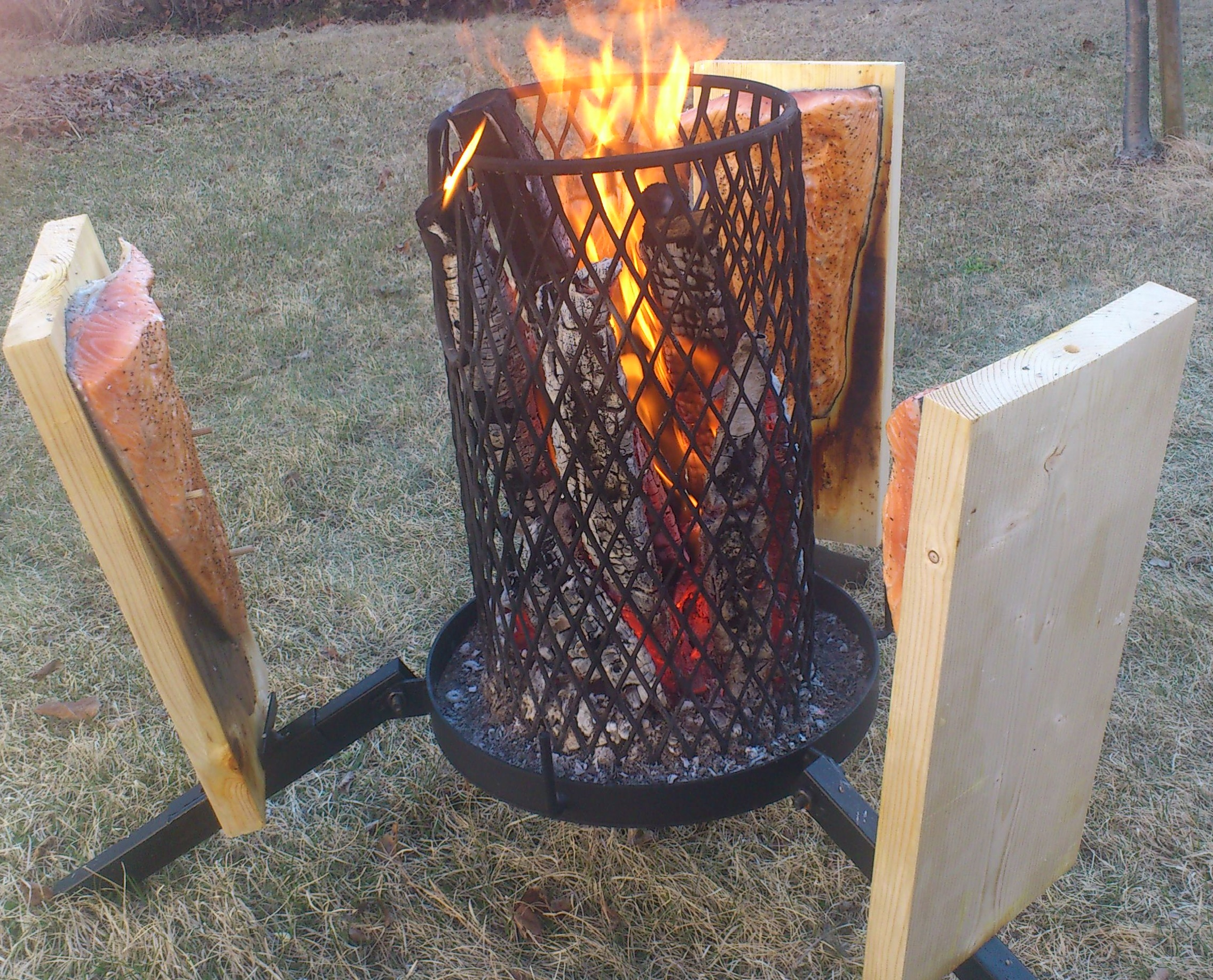
Loimulohi (blazed salmon)

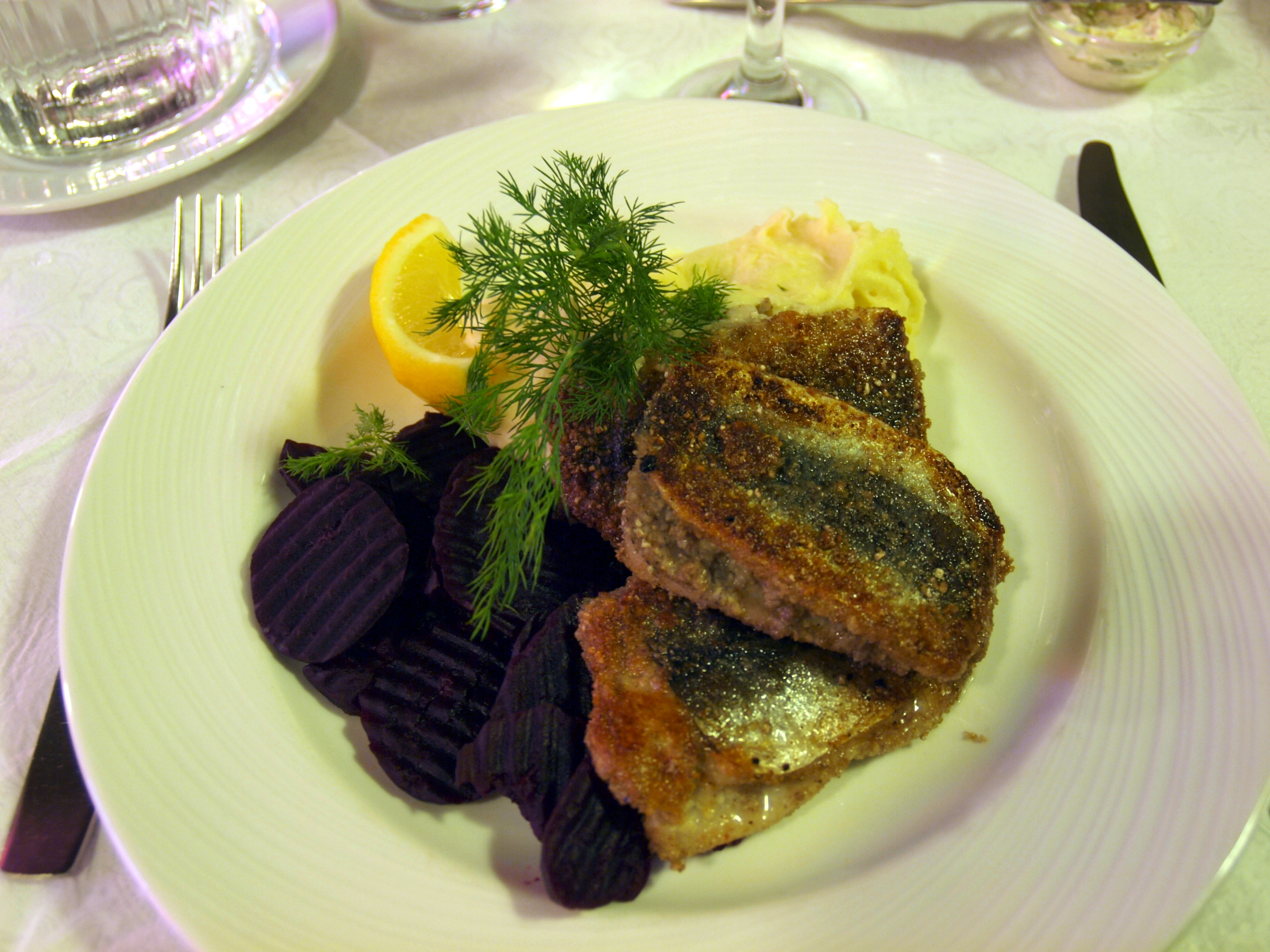
Fried Baltic herring is a popular Finnish dish. It is usually accompanied with boiled or mashed potatoes.

Lakes and rivers in Finland and the Baltic Sea provide many opportunities for fishing and fish has always been an important protein source. Numerous methods of preparing fish are used, including frying, boiling, drying, salting, fermenting, cold smoking or simply slicing sea fish and eating it raw. Salmon is a popular choice, both as kylmäsavustettu lohi: cold smoked salmon, lox, or served raw with lemon juice as graavilohi (gravlax in Swedish). The soup called lohikeitto is also one of the most popular salmon dishes in Finland. It is common to smoke any type of fish, like salmon, zander, pike, perch and Baltic herring. A popular dish among the Swedish-speaking population is smoked herring (Finnish: savusilakka, Swedish: böckling). There are many styles of pickled herring which is a common appetizer and also served around Midsummer accompanied by small potatoes called uusiperuna (nypotatis in Swedish) which means 'new potato', usually the first harvests of potato. Whitefish and vendace roe are Finnish specialties served on top of a toast or with blinis. Crayfish can be found in many lakes and streams in Finland and, in August especially, the Swedish-speaking population often arranges parties centered around eating crayfish and drinking.

=== Mushrooms ===
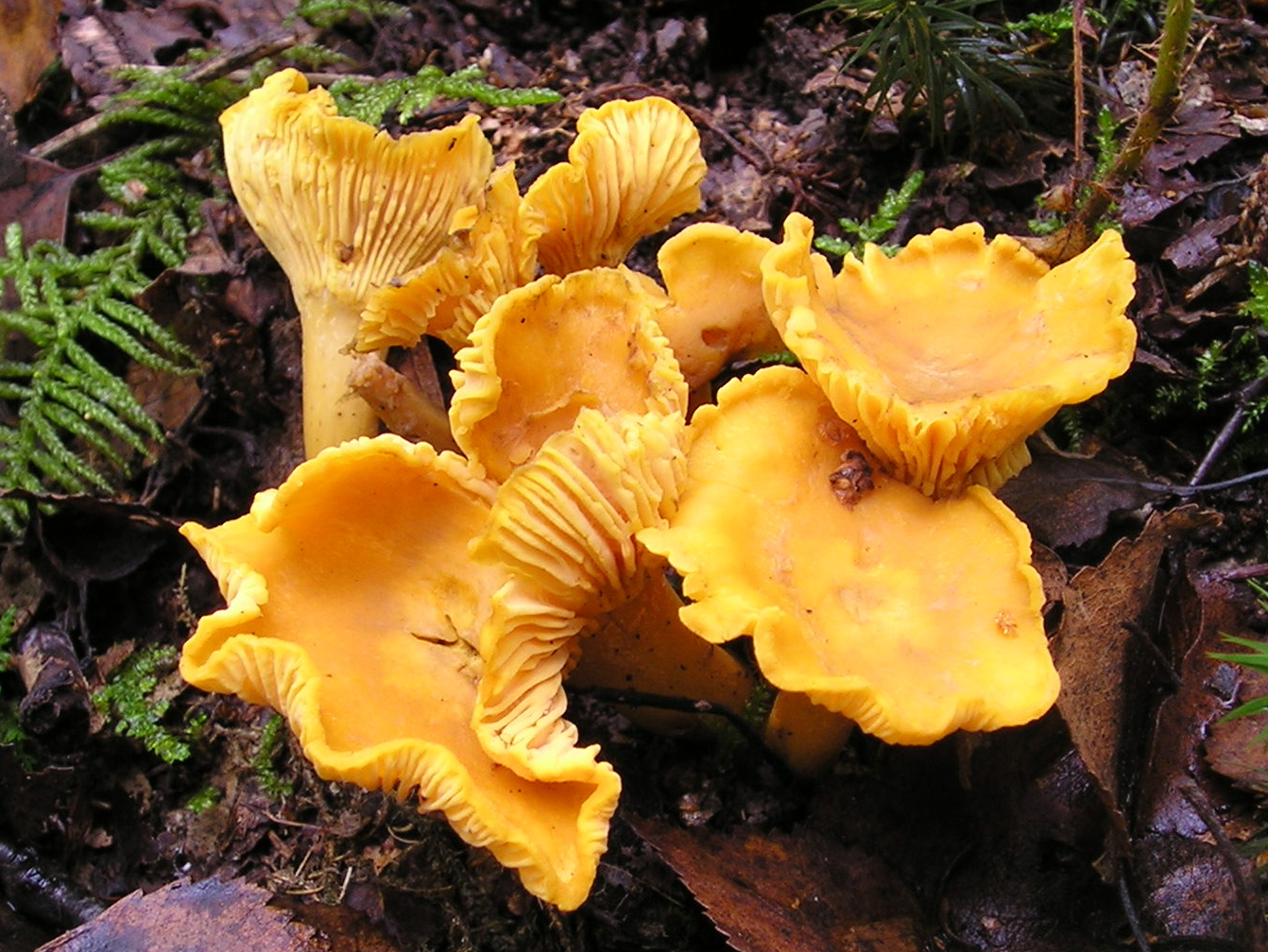
Chanterelles often grow near birch trees.

Various species of mushrooms grow in abundance in Finnish forests and false morels start the season in spring and are used in creamy dishes. Chanterelles and ceps pop up after Midsummer and are popular in the whole country, while in eastern Finland almost all edible fungi are consumed, including milkcaps and russulas. Mushrooms are used in soups, sauces, stews, pie fillings, or simply fried in a pan with onions as a side dish. They are preserved for the winter by pickling or drying. Chanterelles are frequently featured in Finnish haute cuisine with their relatives, winter chanterelles, which often end the season. Just like berry picking, mushroom hunting is also a popular outdoor activity among Finns.

=== Bread ===
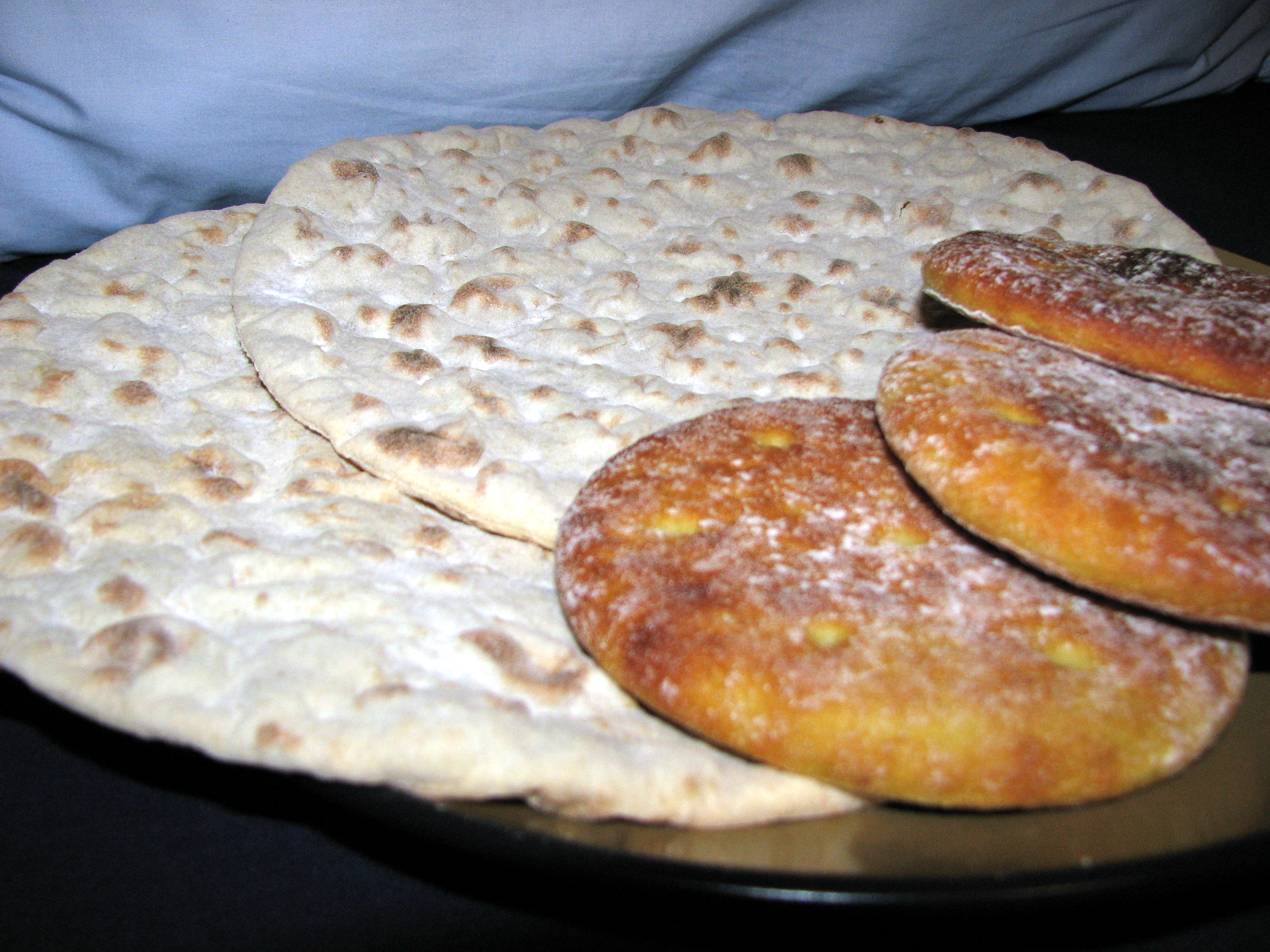
Rye and potato rieska

Dark and fiber-rich ruisleipä, rye bread, is a staple of the Finnish diet. Breads are made from grains like barley, oat, rye and wheat, or by mixing different grits and flours. For example, sihtileipä is made of a combination of rye and wheat. There is also a variety of flat breads called rieska, like maitorieska (milk flatbread), ryynirieska with barley grits from Savonia, läskirieska (lard flatbread) a somewhat flat barley bread with pieces of lard from Western coast, and perunarieska (potato flatbread). In Kainuu, North Finland, the flatbreads are very flat and baked on naked flame. Näkkileipä, crisp rye bread, is also common. Famines caused by crop failures in the 19th century caused Finns to improvise pettuleipä or bark bread, bread made from rye flour and the soft phloem layer of pine bark, which is nutritious, but rock-hard, bitter and poorly digestible. It was eaten also during the Second World War, and the tradition of making this bread has had a minor come-back with claims of health benefits.

=== Porridges ===
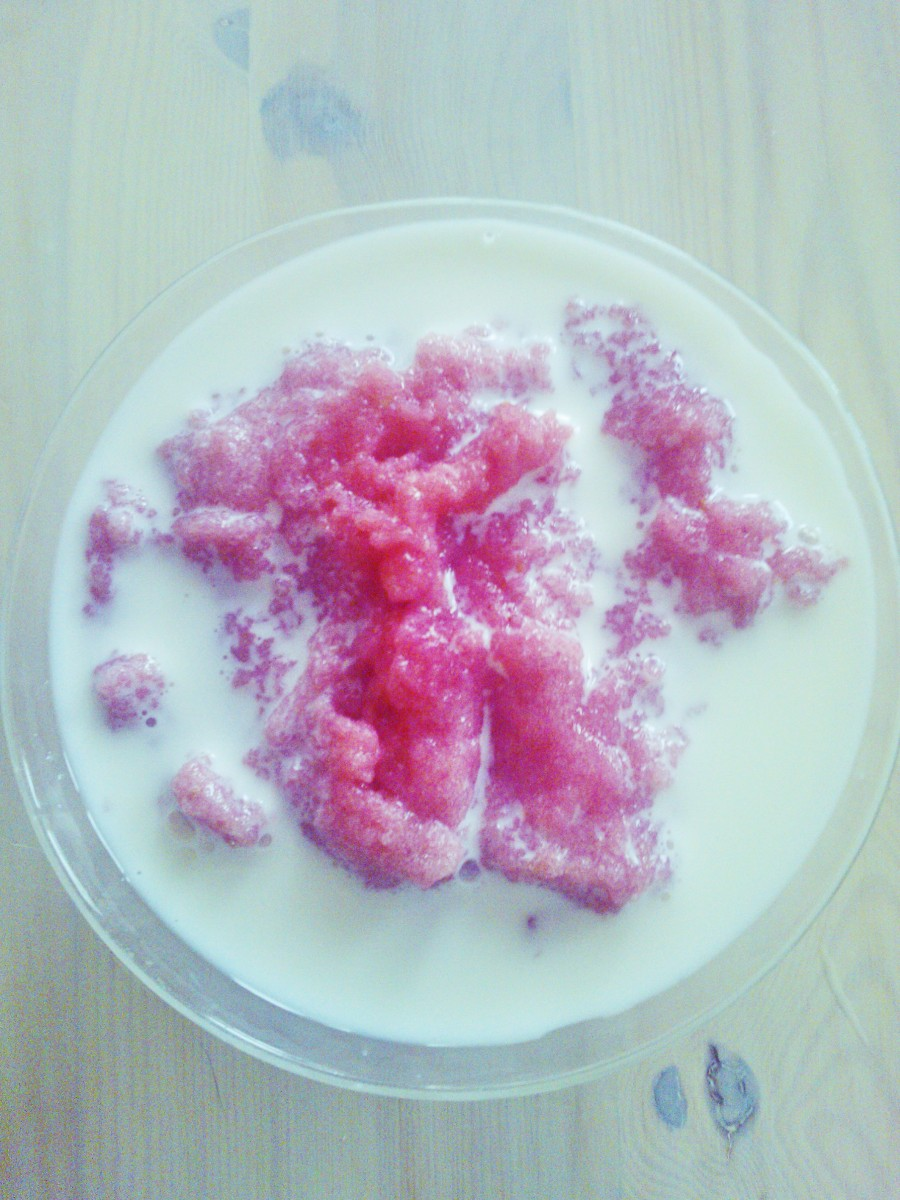
Vispipuuro

The Finnish breakfast traditionally includes a substantial portion of porridge. Rolled oats, rye or multi-grain porridge are most common. However, there are other options such as the milk-based mannapuuro (semolina-milk porridge) and helmipuuro (starch grain-milk porridge). Porridges are often eaten with milk, sugar, butter or berry kiisseli. The Christmas season introduces milk-based rice porridge (riisipuuro), sprinkled with cinnamon and sugar and often topped with prune kiisseli (luumukiisseli). There is also a semolina-based porridge flavored with fresh or frozen lingonberries called vispipuuro ("beaten porridge").

=== Beverages ===
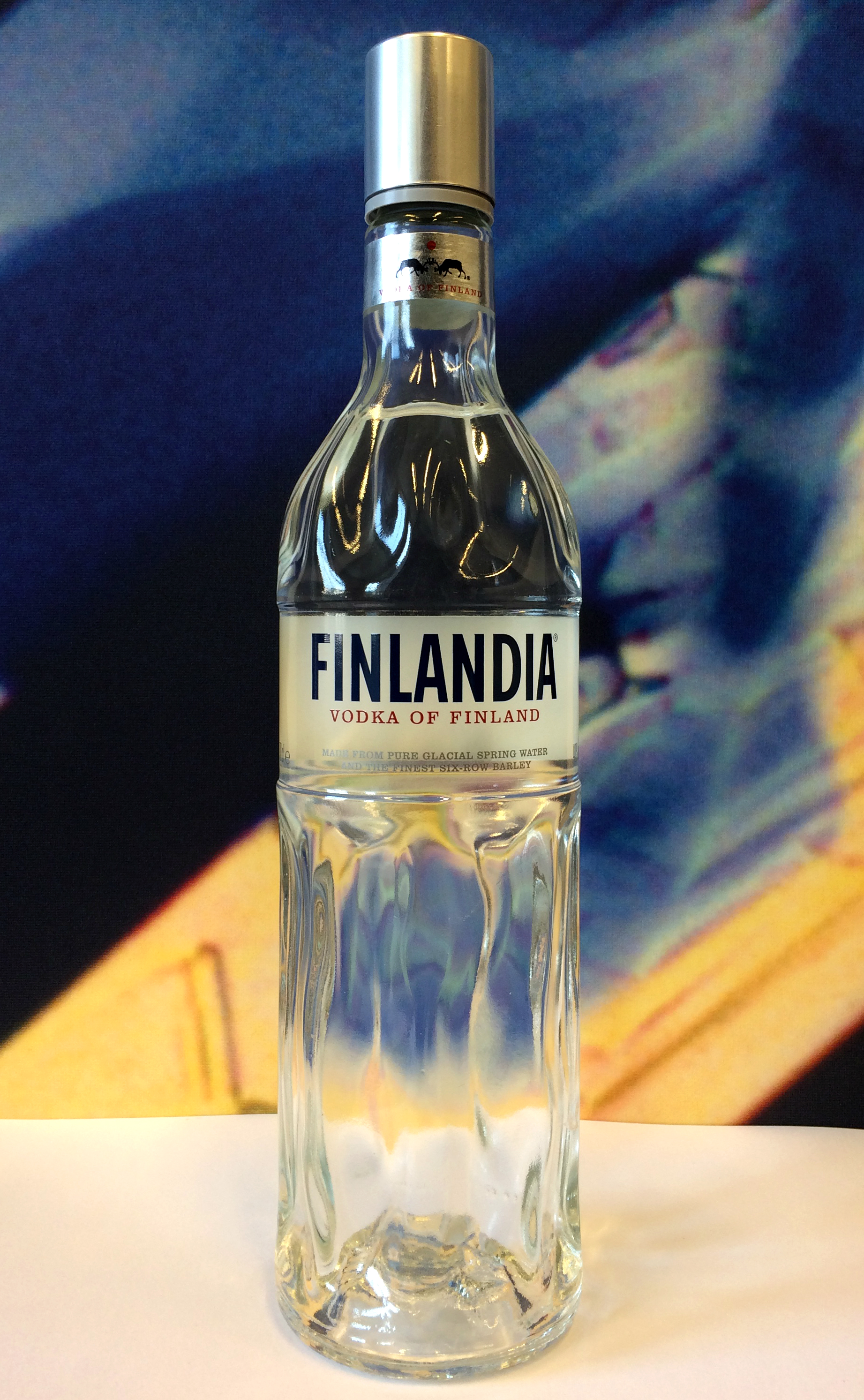
A bottle of Finlandia vodka

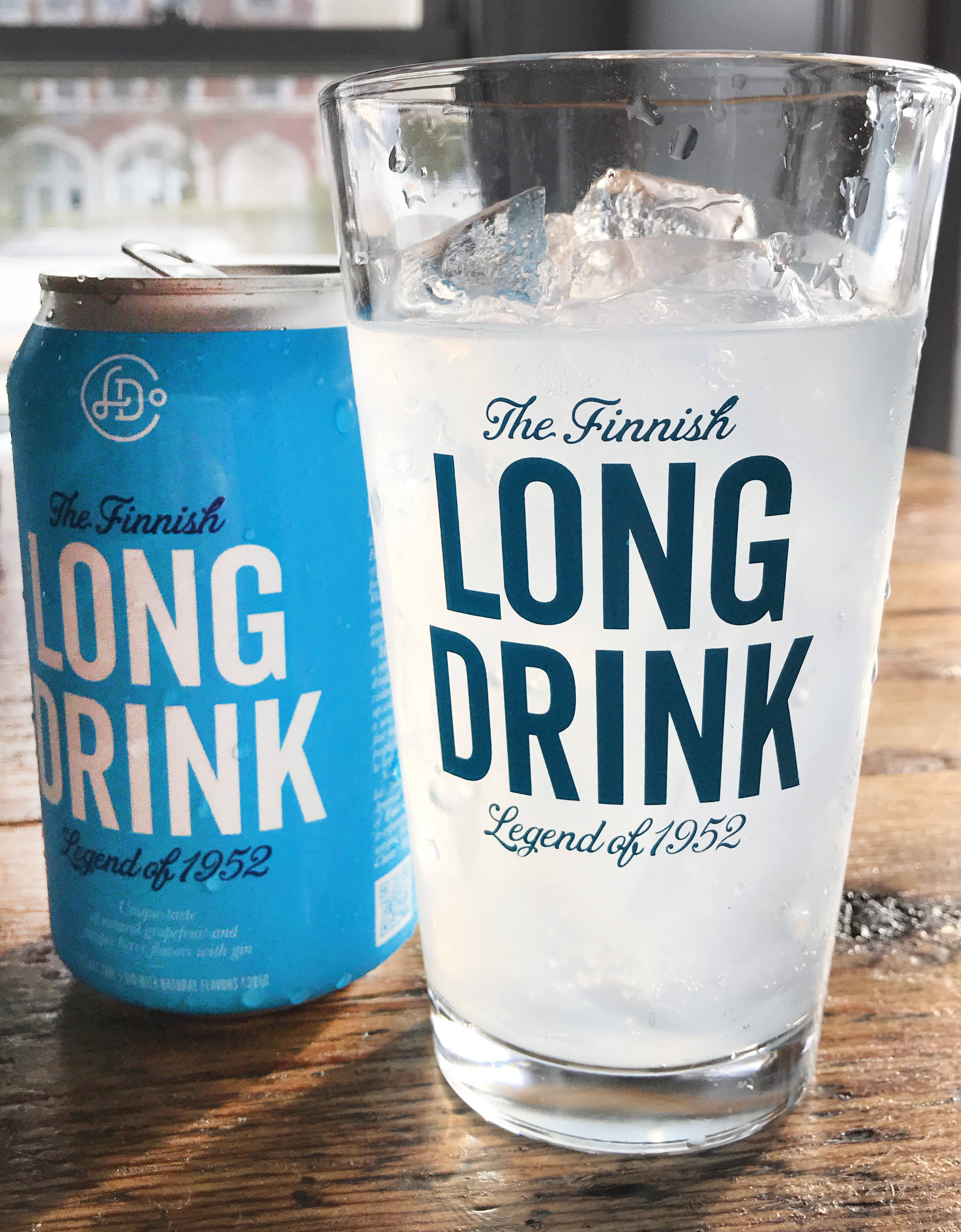
Long drink (lonkero)

Water and coffee are the most common drinks in Finland, but during meals milk and sour milk (piimä, a fermented milk) are popular too, even among adults. Coffee is often drunk several times a day and Finland has the highest per capita consumption of coffee in the world. Tea is also available in most homes. There are several types of home-brewed alcoholic beverages, such as sima (mead) and sahti (traditional beer). Spirits brands include Koskenkorva (vodka-like clear spirit) and a salmiakki flavored shot Salmiakkikossu, Jaloviina (cut brandy), Finlandia vodka, and Marskin ryyppy (Marshal Mannerheim's shot). Around Christmas time a type of mulled wine called glögi is served, also often as a non-alcoholic version. Many berries are used to season liqueurs, such as cloudberry liqueur, and fruit wines are produced from red and black currants. A national specialty would be multiple brands of flavored hard ciders (as in Sweden) and long drink mixes with the pet name lonkero, which was originally a gin and grapefruit soda long drink.

The Finnish beer scene is dominated by pale lagers. Local brands with the highest market share include Koff, Lapin Kulta, Karjala, Olvi and Karhu and their taste is rather similar to the Danish counterparts like Carlsberg and Tuborg. Non-alcoholic beer has also become a popular alternative during recent years. Kotikalja (similar to Slavic kvass) is the traditional small beer. Kotikalja is a malty, sugar-containing sweet beer fermented only for carbonation, thus its alcohol content is low enough (<1.2%) to be served as a soft drink. Hops are often absent. Fresh kotikalja is unfiltered, cloudy and cannot be stored. A Finnish beer specialty is sahti, a traditional ale flavoured with juniper berries.

=== Desserts ===
- Pulla, sweet, cardamom-flavored bread eaten with coffee or as dessert
  - Cinnamon rolls (korvapuustit) – pulla made into a roll with cinnamon and sugar
- Kiisseli – water, sugar, berry juice and berries (nowadays often canned or frozen) thickened with potato starch flour, served with milk/cream and sugar. These may be less liquid than drink-like. Mustikkakeitto (Swedish: blåbärssoppa), depending on preparation, but not gelatinous.
- Leipäjuusto, a soft cheese often served with cloudberry jam (lakkahillo) and coffee.
- Runeberg torte, named after a national poet Johan Ludvig Runeberg and served on his memorial day on 5 February.
- Rönttönen pastry with lingonberry filling
- Uunijuusto, baked milk dish eaten with berries
- Vispipuuro (whipped porridge) a sweet pink dessert porridge with lingonberries or other berries, served with milk and sugar
- Sultsina, a cross between a crêpe and a flatbread, made of unleavened rye dough and a farina filling
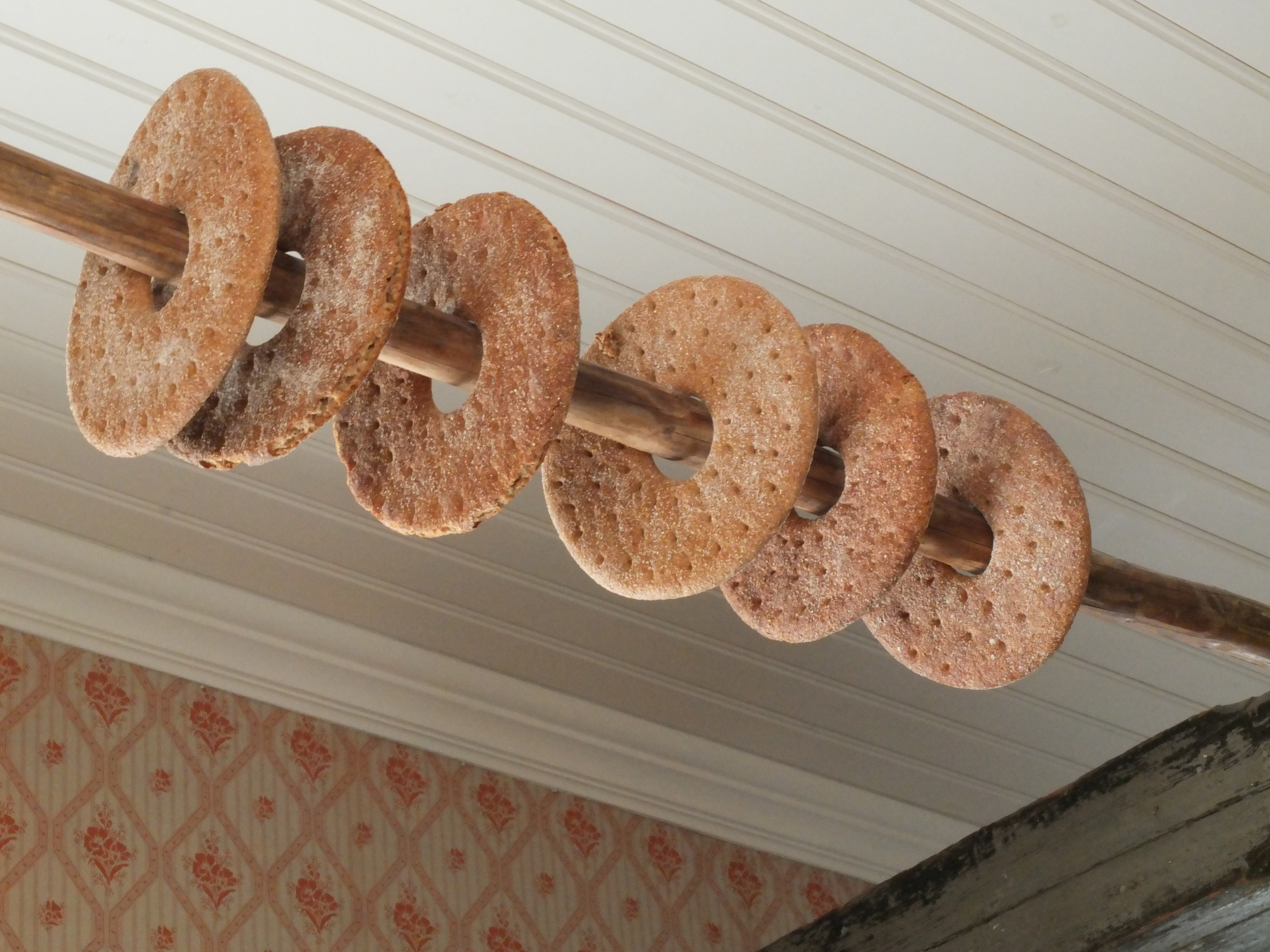
Ruisreikäleipä (rye hole-bread)

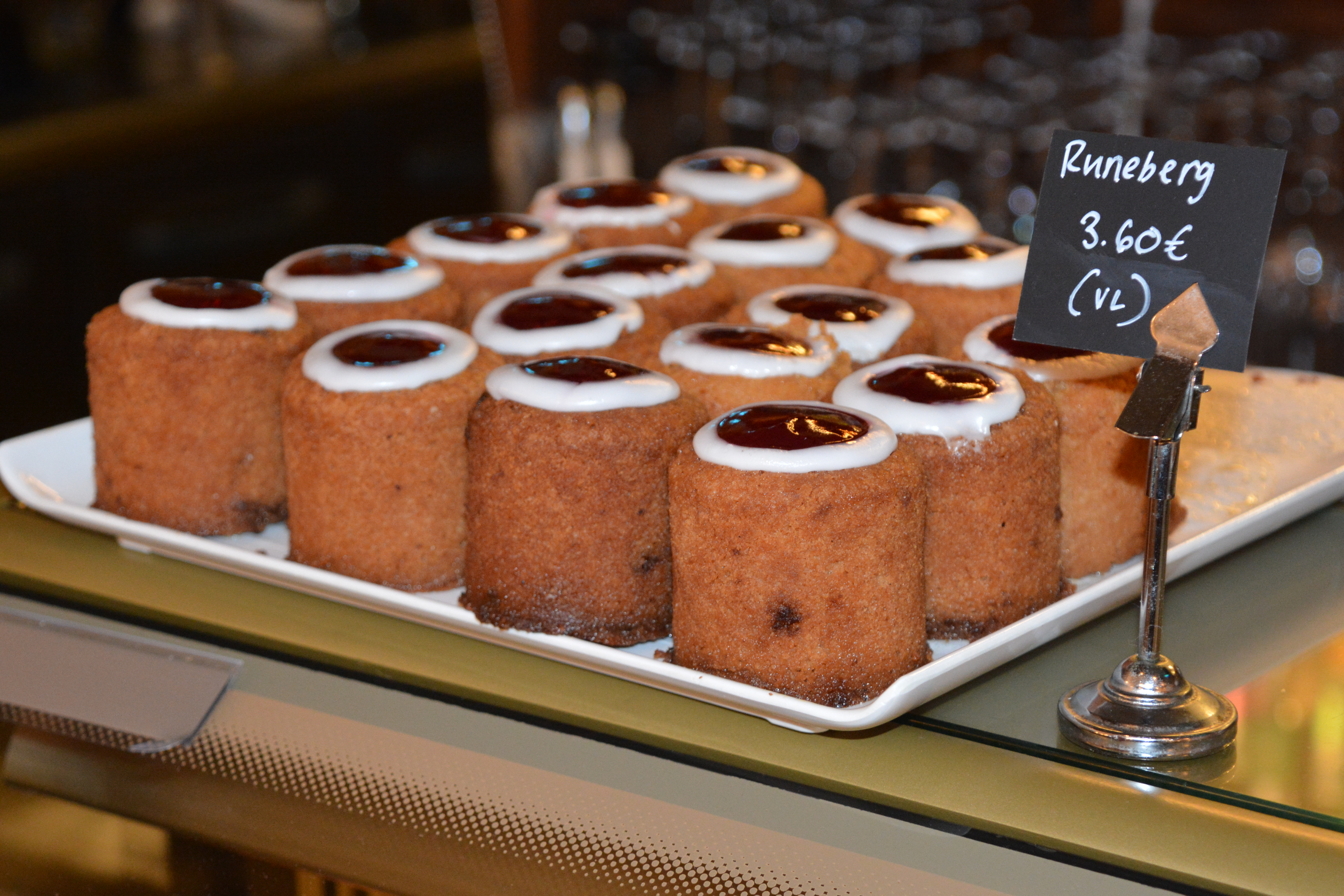
Runeberg tortes

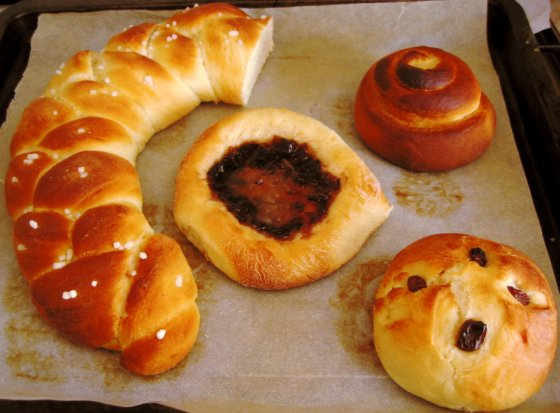
Several types of pulla sweet bread

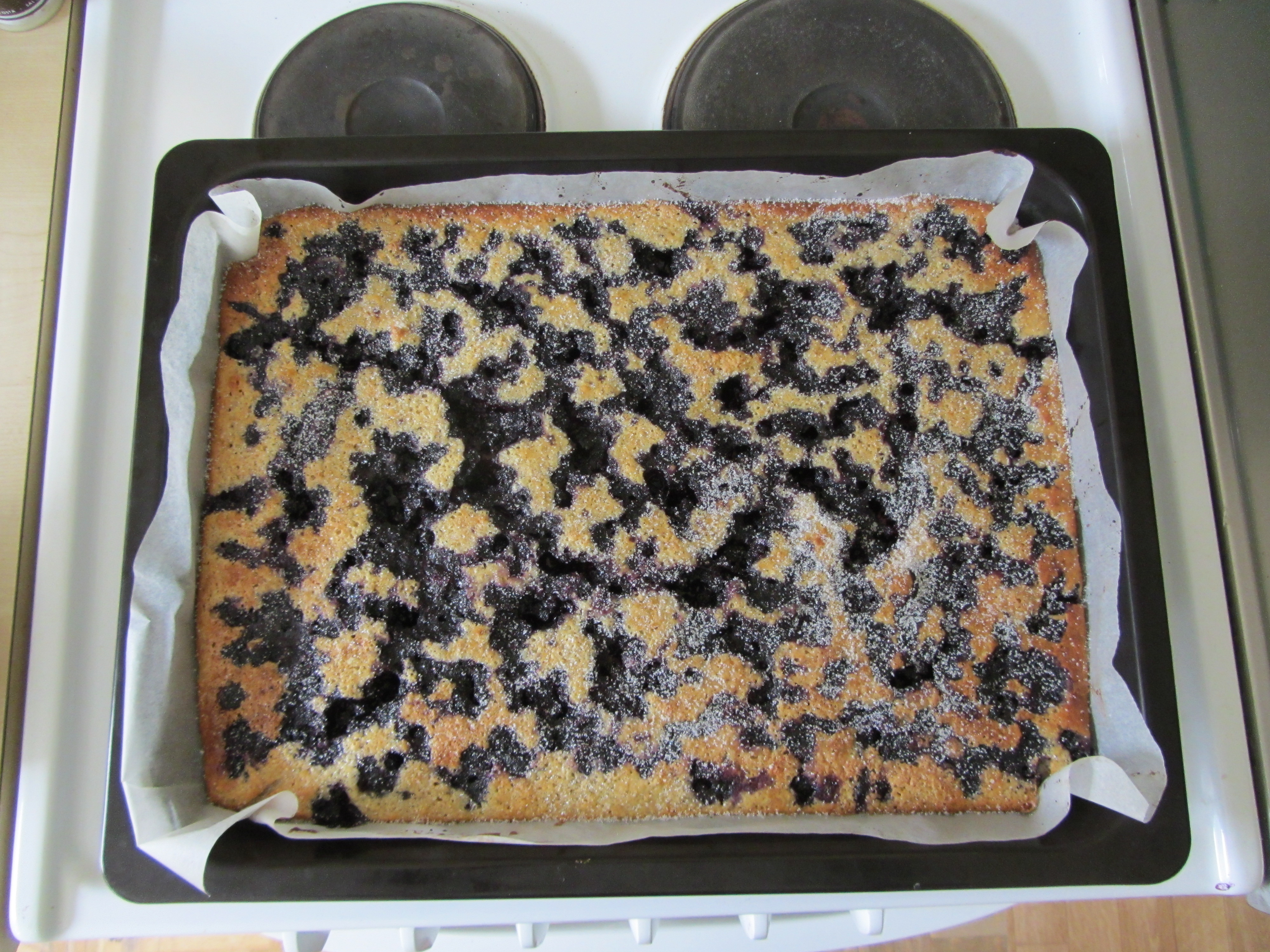
Blueberry pie (mustikkapiirakka) is a very popular dessert.

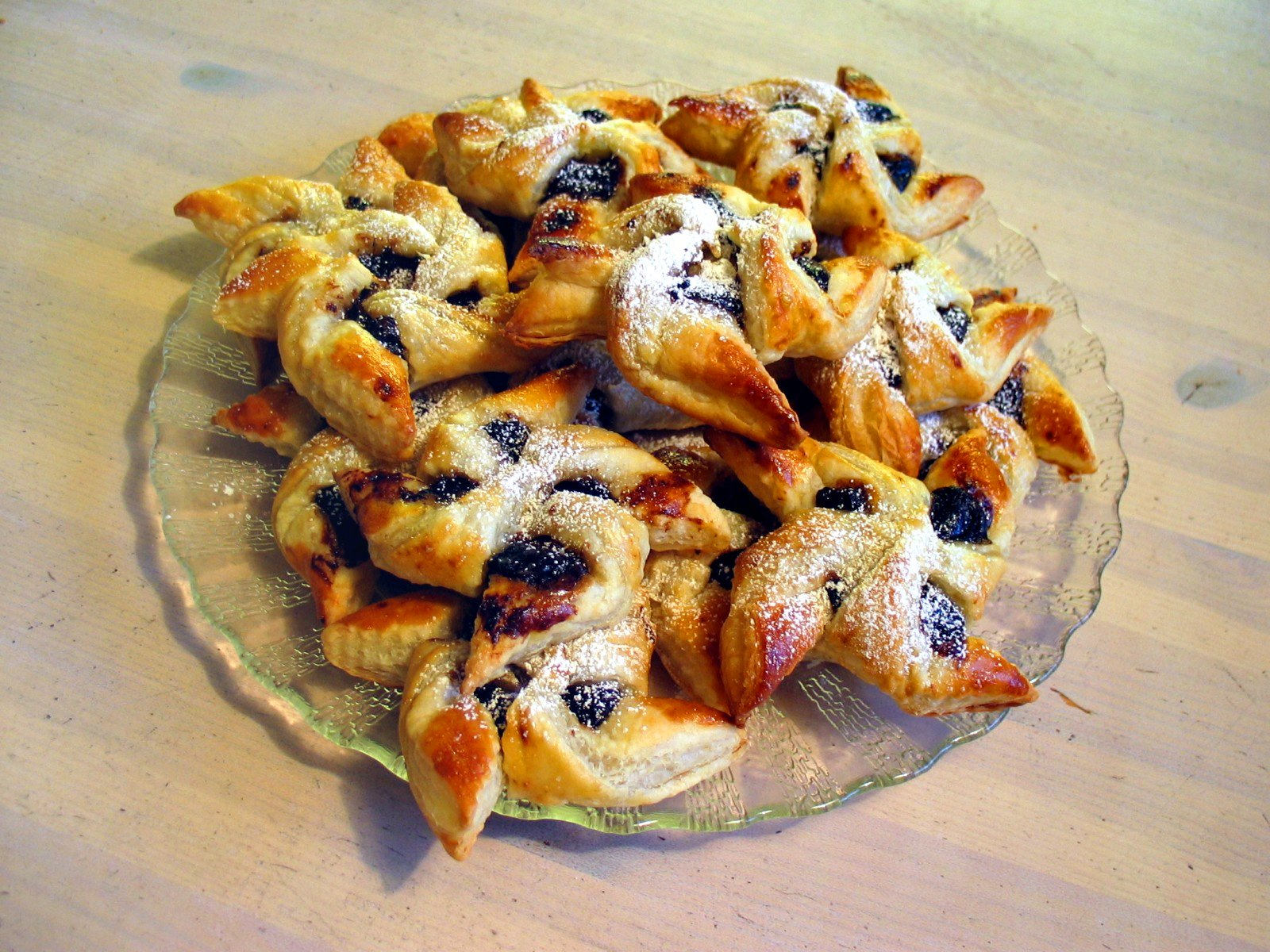
Joulutorttu (Christmas pastry)

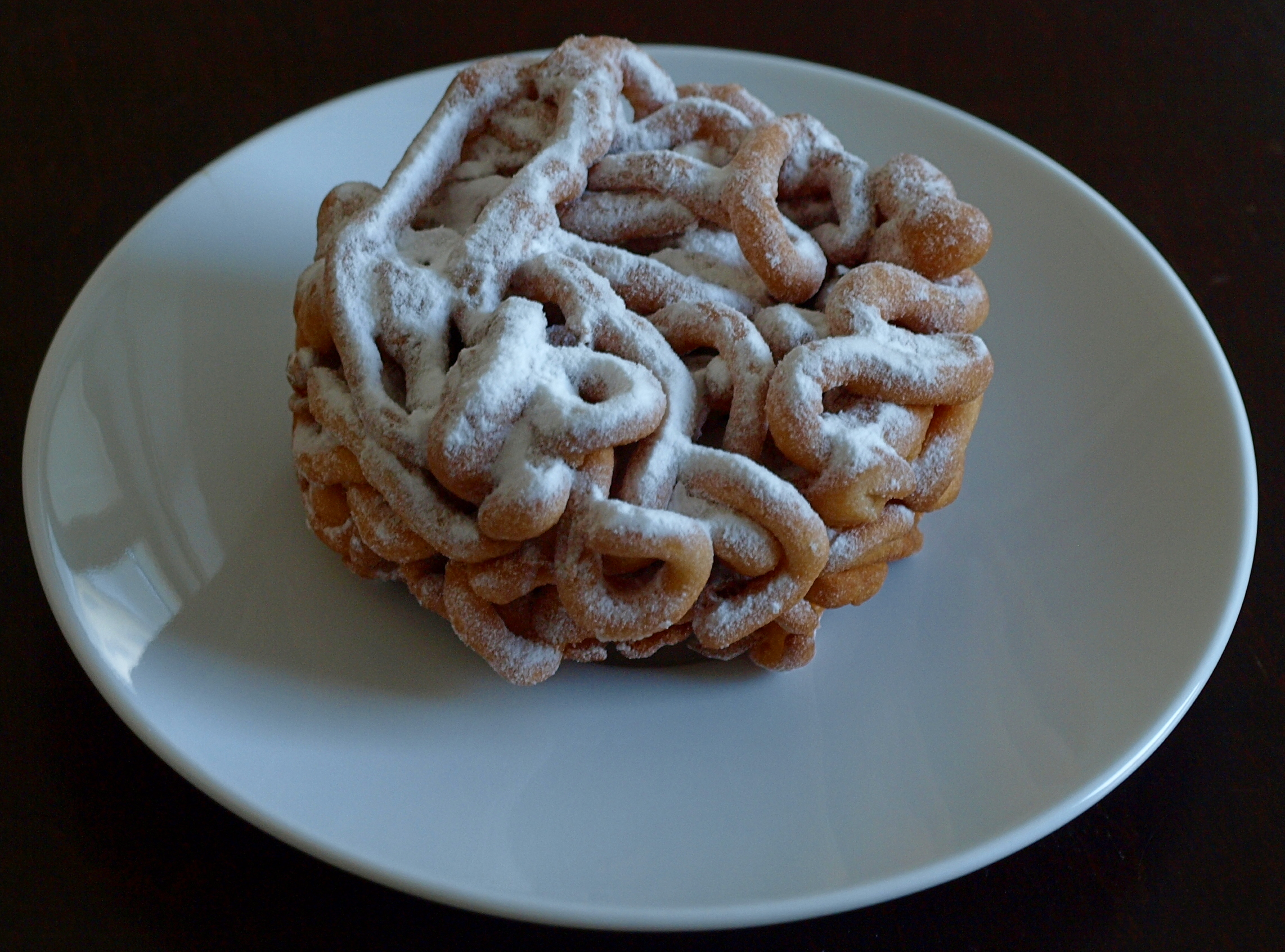
Funnel cake (tippaleipä)

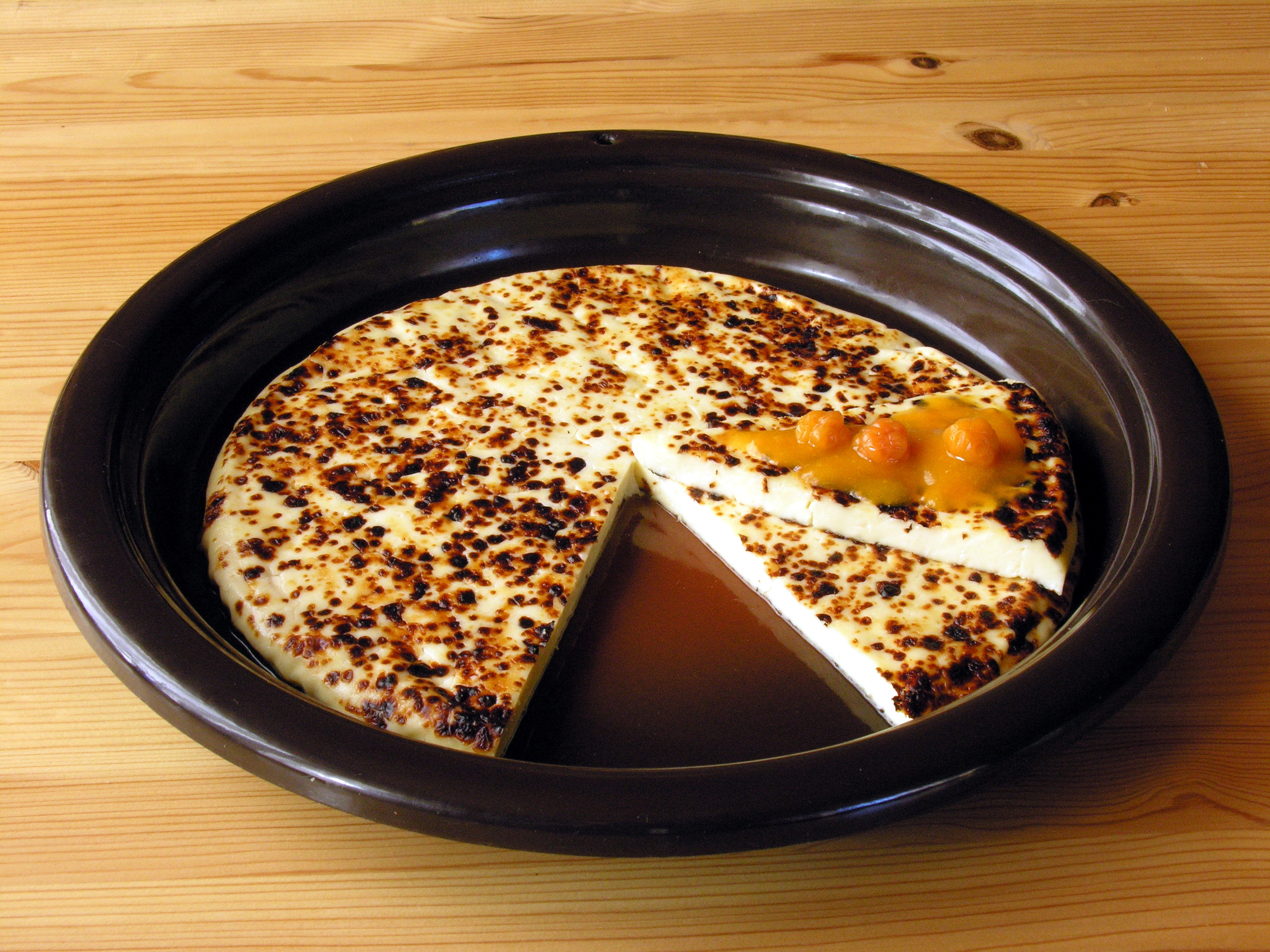
Leipäjuusto (bread cheese) served with cloudberry jam

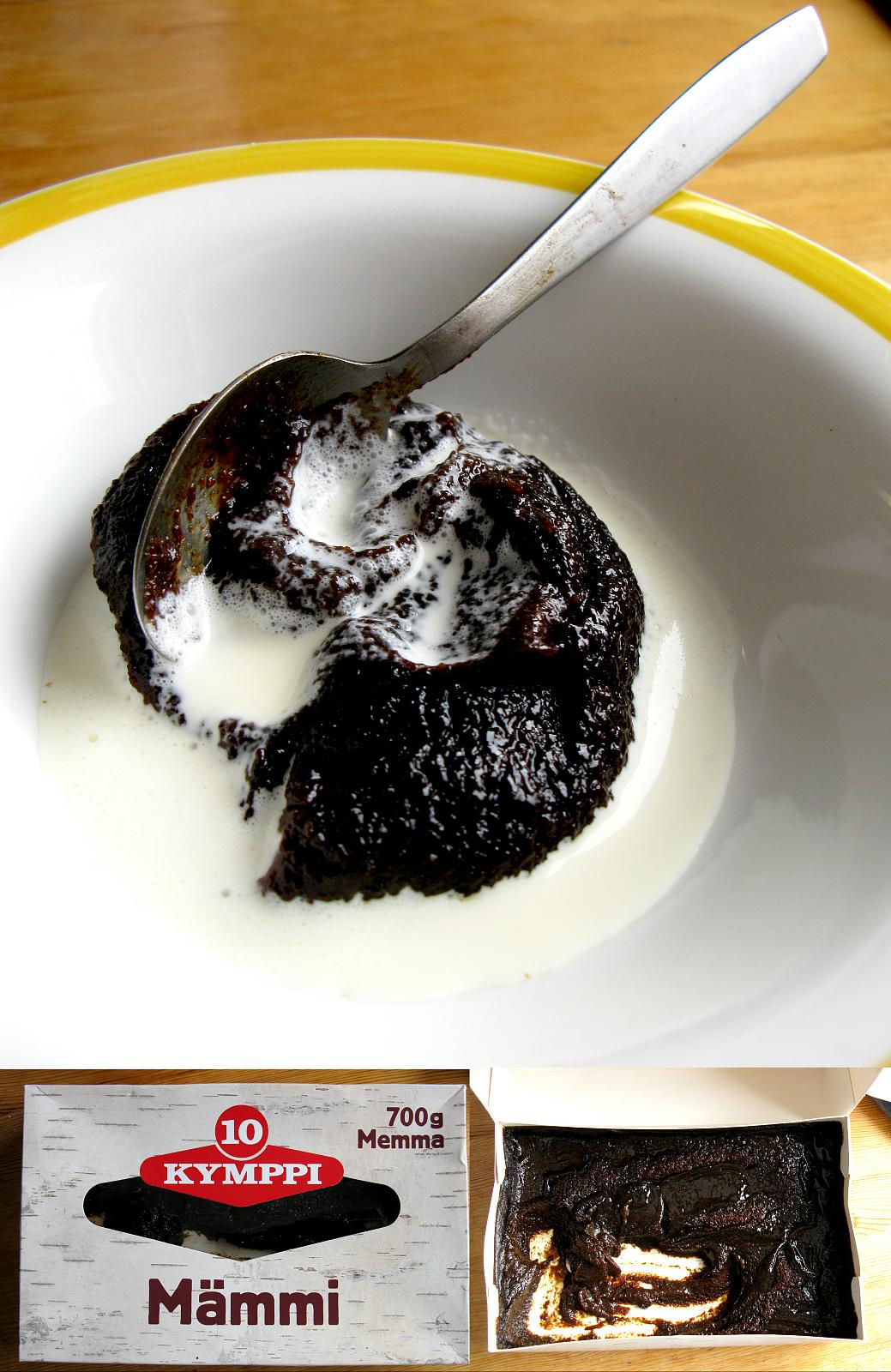
Mämmi (dessert during Easter time)

=== Sweets ===
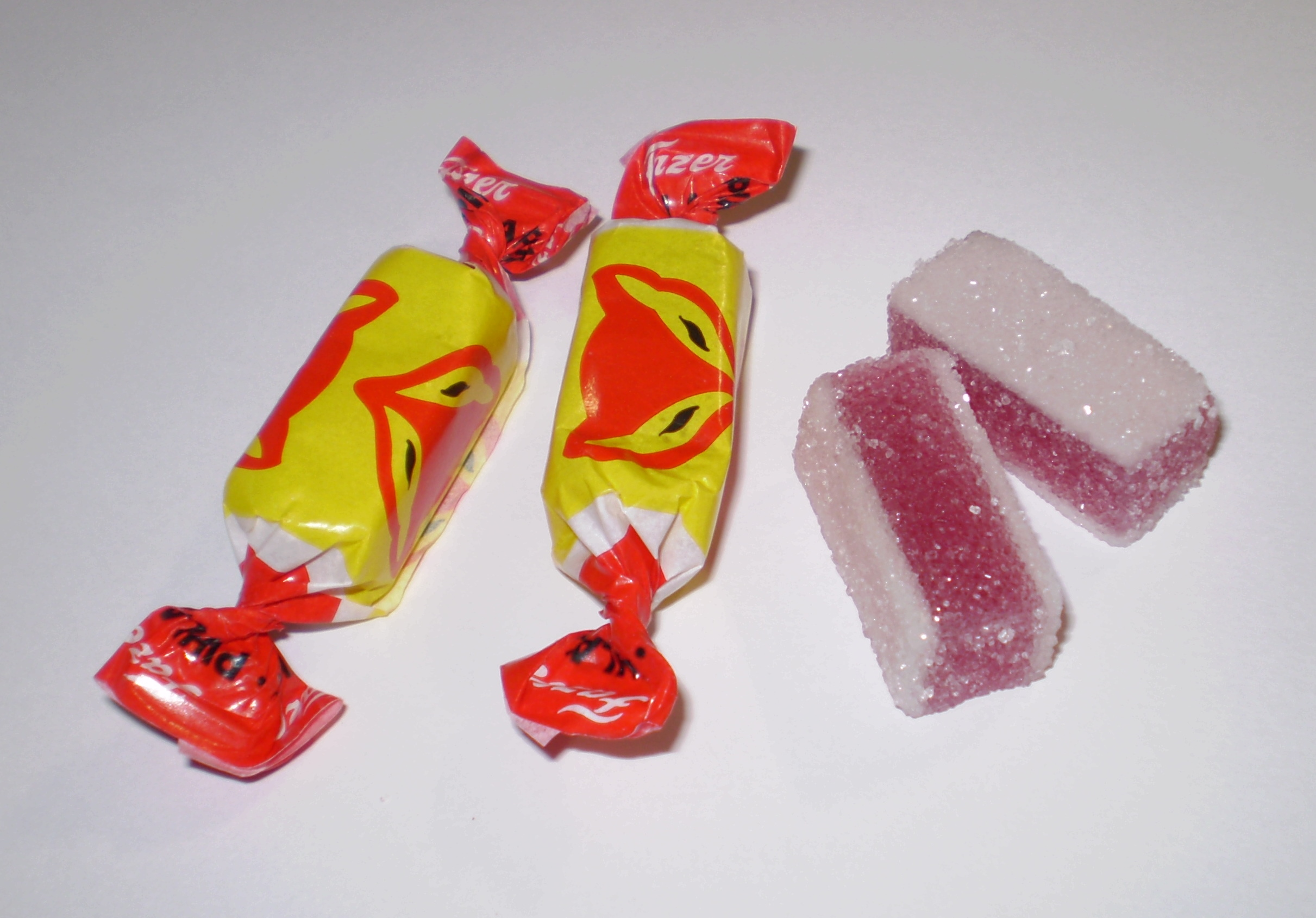
Pihlaja marmalade candy

- Salmiakki – salty black liquorice candy
- Licorice pipe – sweet black liquorice candy
- Sisu pastil – gum arabic manufactured candy
- Fazer Blue (Fazer Sininen) – milk chocolate
- Kismet – (waffle chocolate bar)
- Tupla – (chocolate bar)
- Pihlaja – marmalade candy
- Kiss-Kiss – hard pink peppermint-flavoured shell and a sticky toffee filling candy
- Marianne – hard peppermint-flavoured shell and a chocolate filling candy
- Omar – caramel candy
- Wood tar – (terva) flavoured candy, such as Terva Leijona
- Jenkki – Finnish chewing gum
- Mynthon – throat lozenge, pastille

== Examples of Finnish dishes ==
The term perinneruoka ("traditional dish") is often applied to specialties that are rarely eaten on a daily basis. These are often regional, associated with the older generations or specific holidays—for example, mämmi on Easter—and most people eat these dishes rarely, or not at all. In contrast, with perinneruoka, the term kotiruoka ("home-made food") is applied to daily staple dishes. Meatballs, pea soup and rye bread are examples of such staples.

The following list is a sample of typical dishes traditionally consumed in Finland.

=== Typical Finnish dishes ===
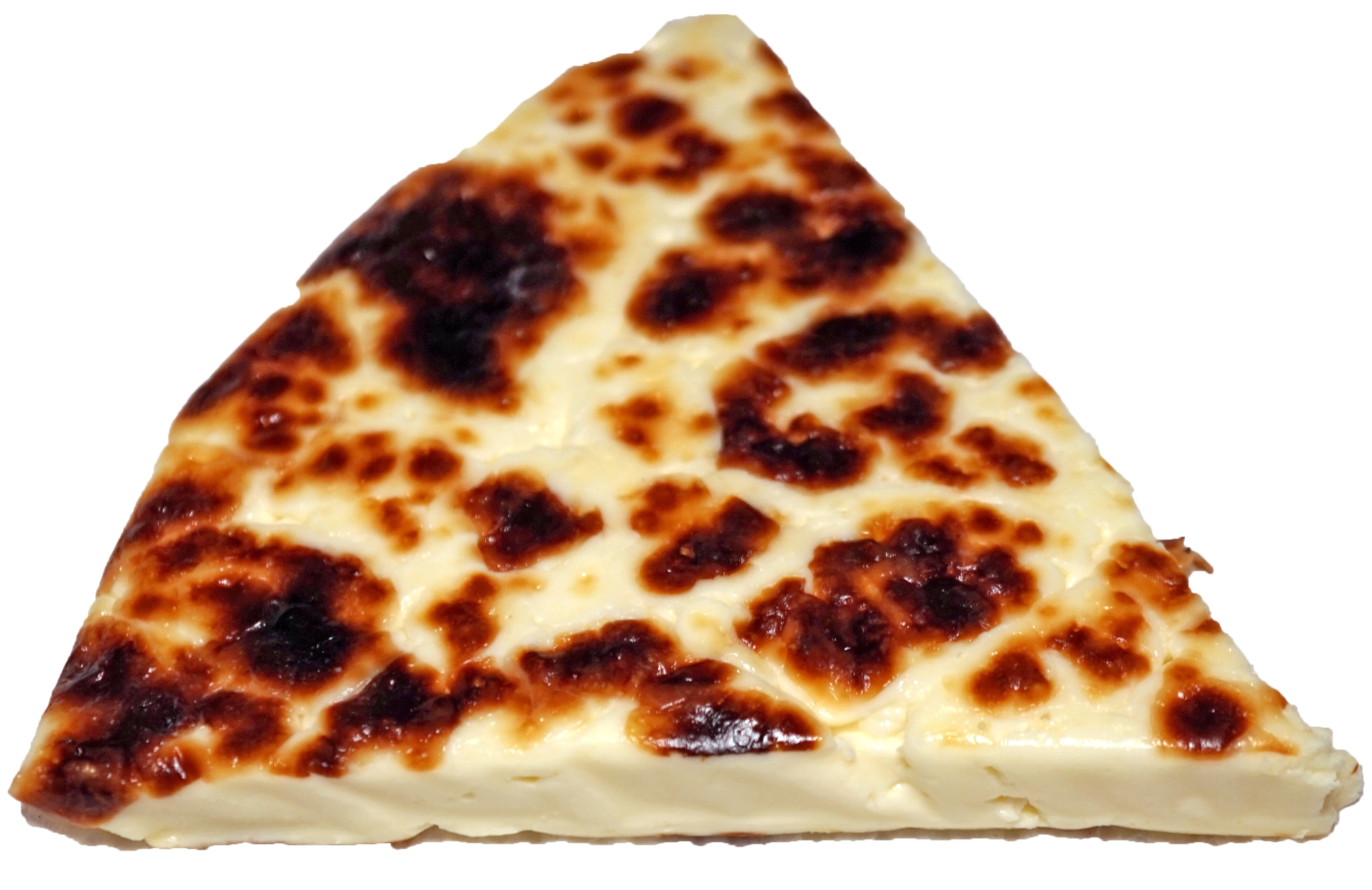
Leipäjuusto is a soft cheese.

- Kaalikääryleet – cabbage rolls
- Game – moose, deer, grouse, duck, hare, and other wild meats. Rarely attainable in restaurants, except the finest ones. Common amongst those whose hobby is hunting.
- Hernekeitto – pea soup, usually served on Thursdays, along with pancakes for dessert.
- Leipäjuusto, alternate names hiilikko and juustoleipä – a halloumi-like soft cheese
- Viili – a yoghurt-like fermented milk product
- Perunamuusi – mashed potato, a common side dish
- Pickled vegetables
- Lihapullat – Finnish meatballs, often in gravy and with lingonberry sauce on the side
- Palvikinkku and palviliha – smoked ham or beef
- Karelian hot pot - stew of combination of beef and pork and vegetables
- Fried vendace - usually served with mashed potatoes

=== Holiday specialties ===
==== Shrove Tuesday ====
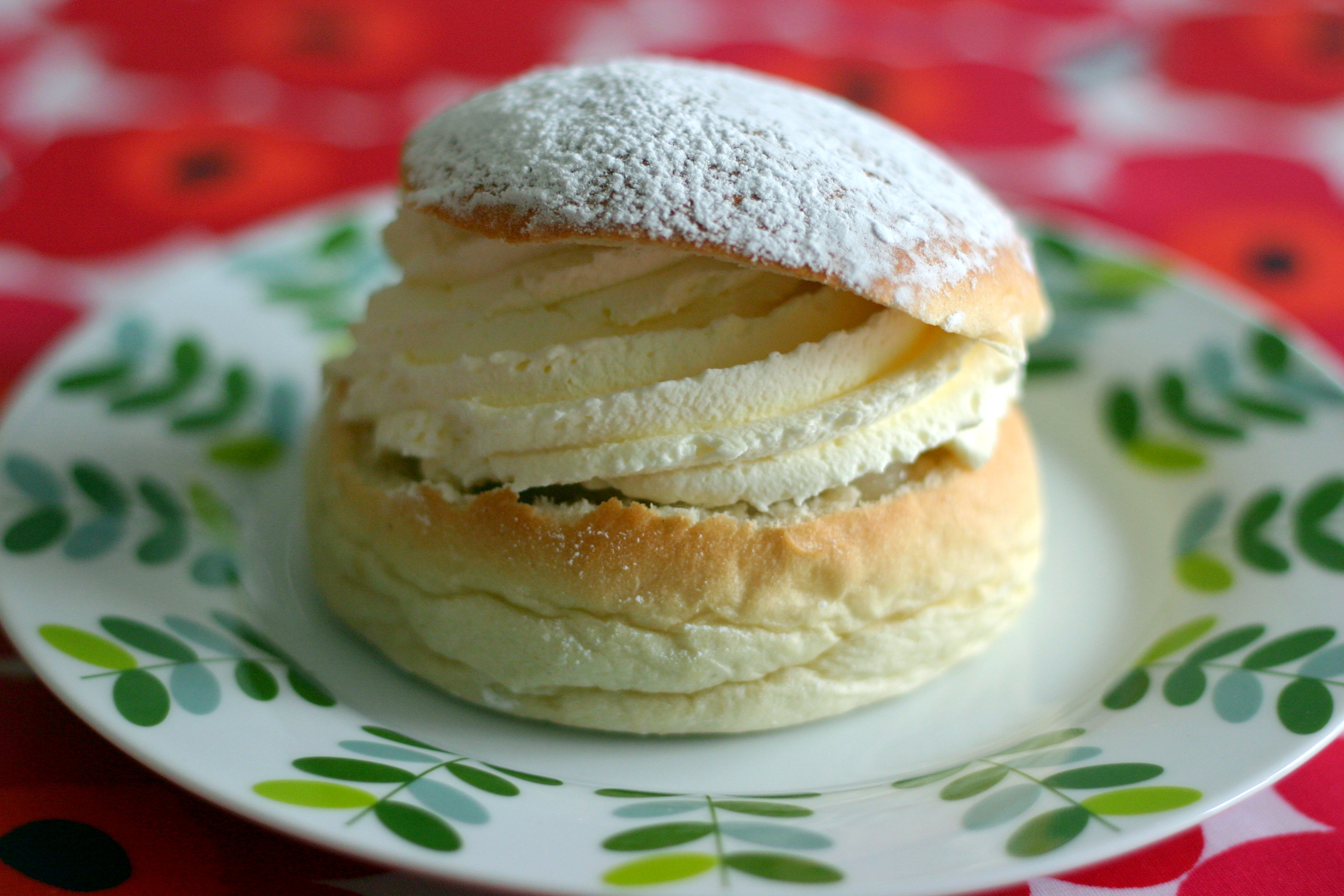
Laskiaispulla

- Hernekeitto – pea soup made with ham
- Laskiaispulla – ('Shrovetide pulla') filled with whipped cream and almond paste or jam

==== Easter ====
- Mämmi – Easter dessert pudding: sweetened, oven-baked rye malt porridge, served with sugar and milk or cream, available frozen around the year. In the Catholic era it was Lent food and also served on Good Friday.
- Pasha – a dessert made of quark, butter, eggs and spices; originates from Russia

==== Vappu (May Day) ====
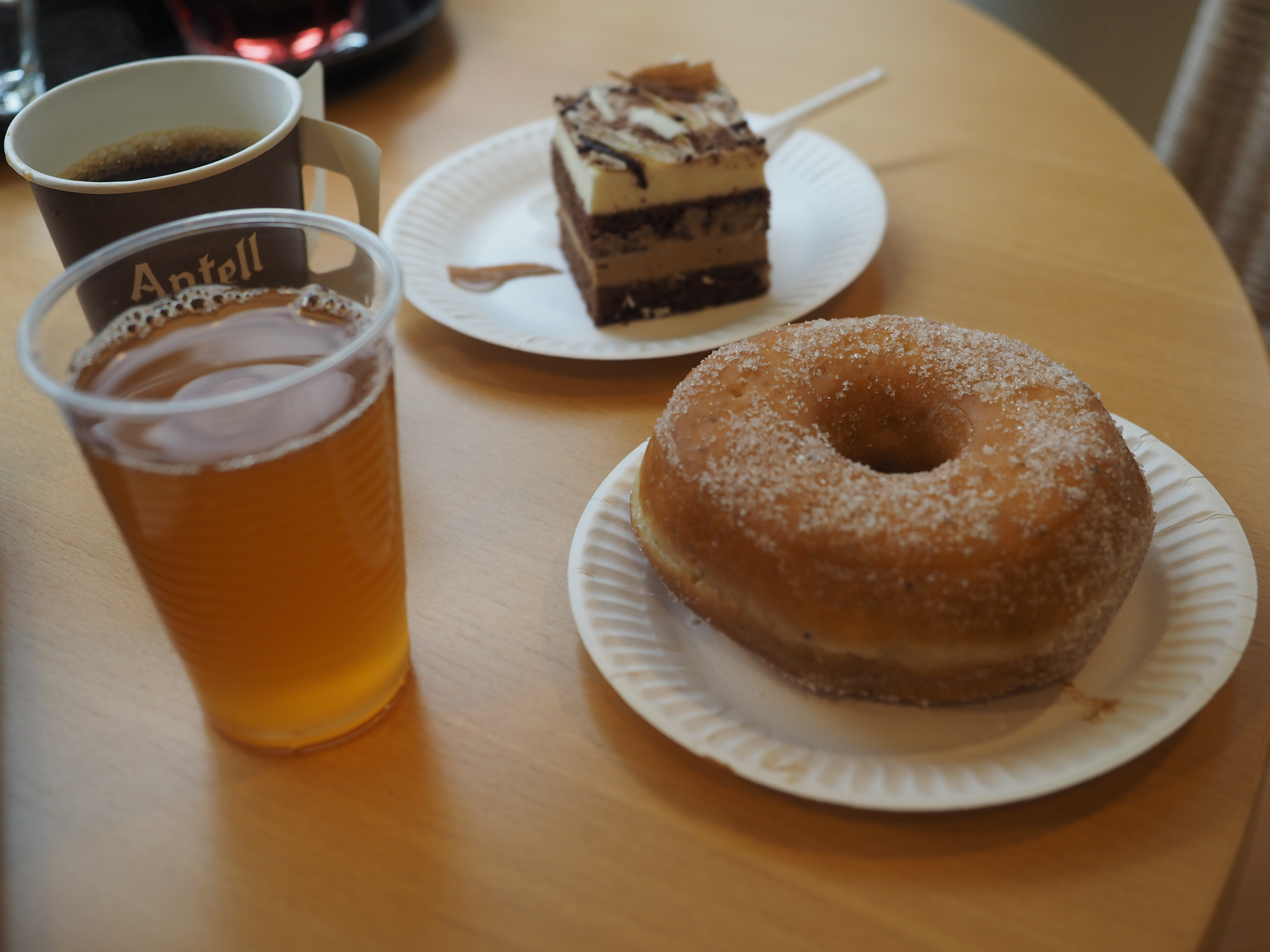
A munkki and a glass of sima served as dessert on 30 April, Vappu eve

- Sima – mead, home-made or purchased
- Munkki (deep-fried pulla coated in sugar, similar to doughnuts)
- Tippaleipä ('May Day fritters'), a kind of funnel cake

==== Christmas ====
- Joulupöytä ('Christmas table') consists of many dishes, some of which are almost entirely exclusive to Christmas, such as lipeäkala.
- Glögi, mulled wine, is served during the holiday season.

== Regional cuisine ==
=== Lapland ===
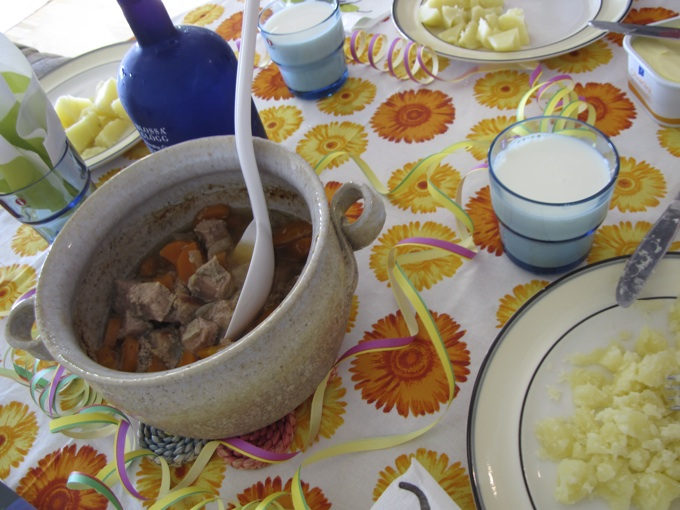
Karelian stew has been voted as the national food of Finland.

- Sautéed reindeer (poronkäristys)
- Lohikeitto salmon soup with cream

=== Kainuu ===
- Rönttönen, pastry with lingonberry filling (PGI protection under EU law)
- Smoked meat soup
- Kainuun juustoleipä, bread cheese
- Vendace fish soup
- Pettuleipä ('Pettu-bread'), a bark bread made from rye flour and pine phloem during famine years

=== Karelia ===
- Karelian pasties are popular throughout the whole of Finland
- Karelian stew is often eaten on Finland's Independence Day and on Christmas
- Sultsina sold at the market square in Joensuu and other places in the area
- Särä, slow roasted mutton and potato dish from Lemi

=== Savonia ===
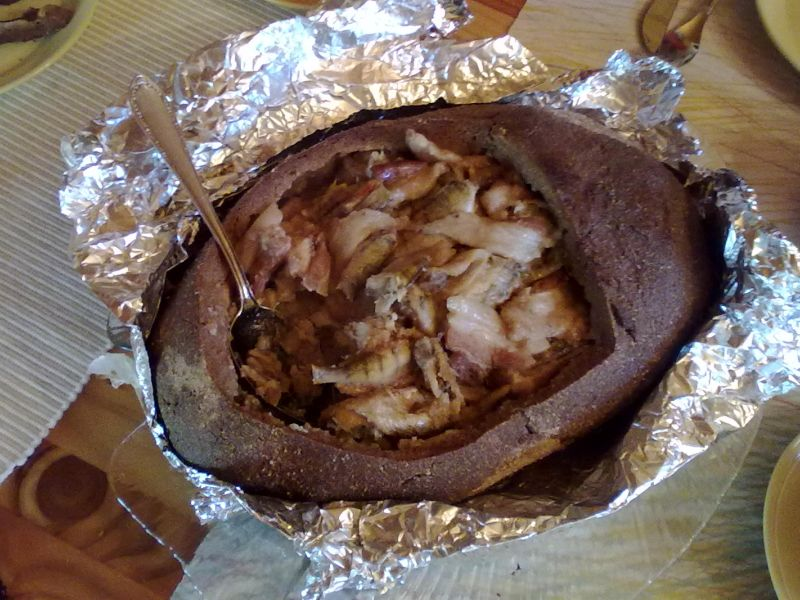
Traditional Savonian (Eastern Finland) 'kalakukko' made with European perch and pork belly

- Kalakukko, fish pasty loaf
- Mykyrokka, blood dumpling soup
- Lörtsy, pastry filled with sour or sweet fillings (meat, vegetable or jam)

=== Ostrobothnia and Åland ===
Due to the location on the west coast, the cuisine has some local specialities.

- Klimpsoppa, flour dumpling soup
- Åland pancake, typically made of leftover porridge and served with plum jam
- Swedish svartbröd ('black bread') is eaten in Swedish-speaking Åland; similar dark bread, known as skärgårdslimpa ('islander's bread', referring to Åland), is made on southern coast, and in Malax on the Ostrobothnian coast (malaxlimpa). This bread, coloured dark brown, is made from rye and contains a substantial quantity of dark syrup.

=== Other specialties ===
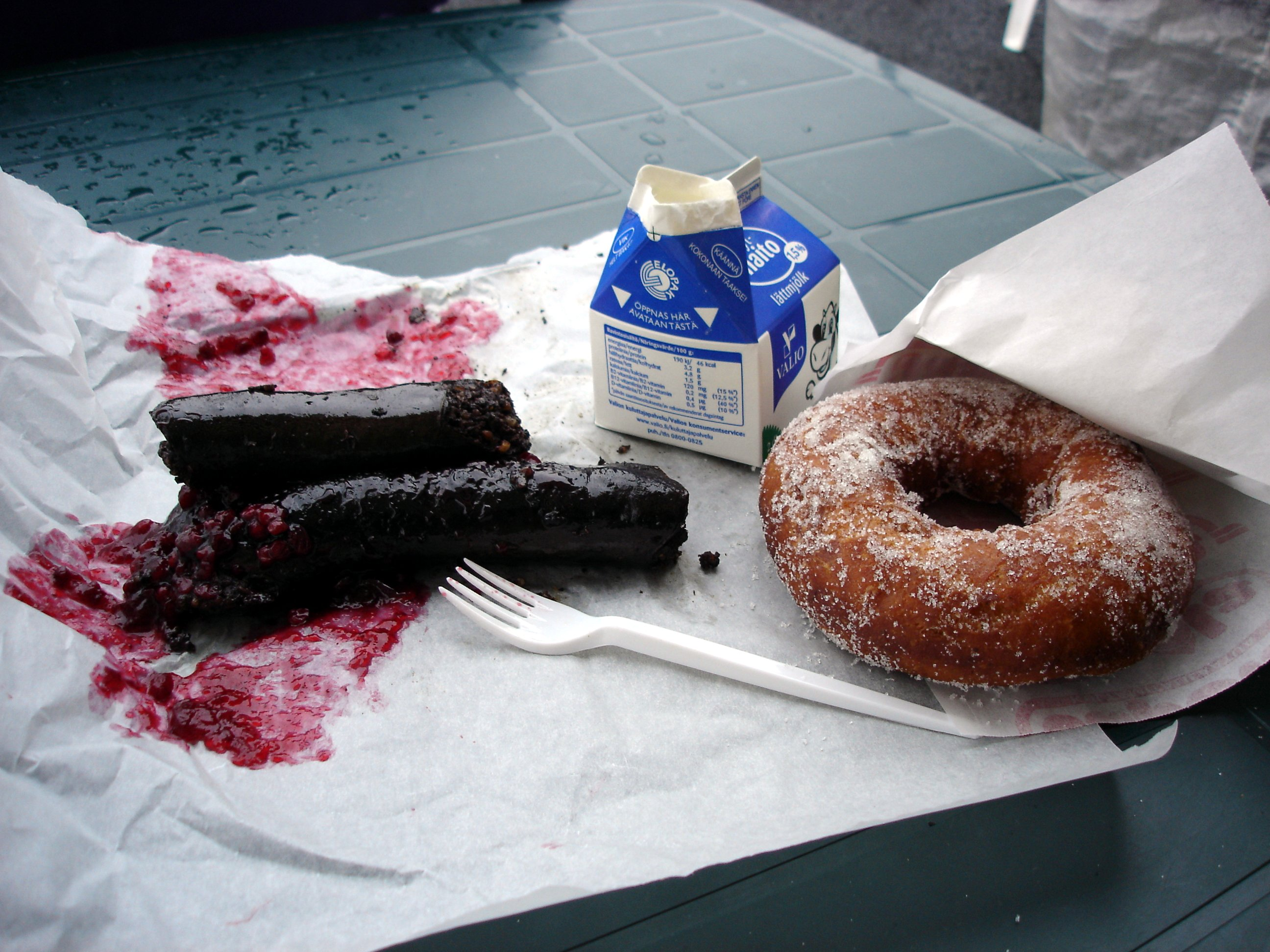
Mustamakkara meal

- Kesäkeitto – a traditional vegetable soup with butter and milk
- Mustamakkara – blood sausage from Tampere
- Rössypottu from Oulu (mixed blood pudding and pork stew)
- Hapanvelli (rye and pea porridge) from Virolahti
- Kakko, a type of white bread baked mostly in the Satakunta region

== Meals ==
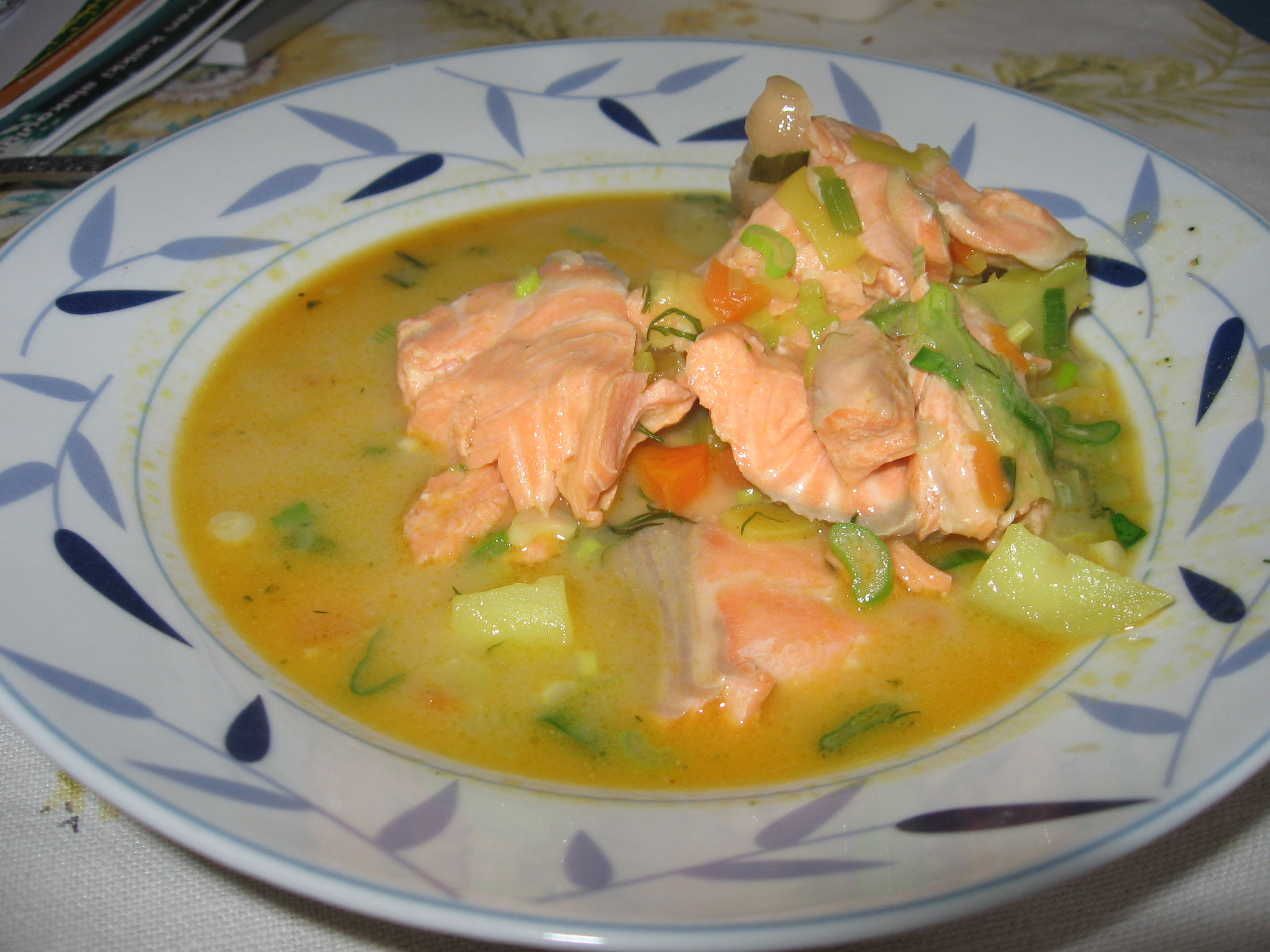
Lohikeitto is a creamy salmon soup and a common dish in Finland and other Nordic countries.

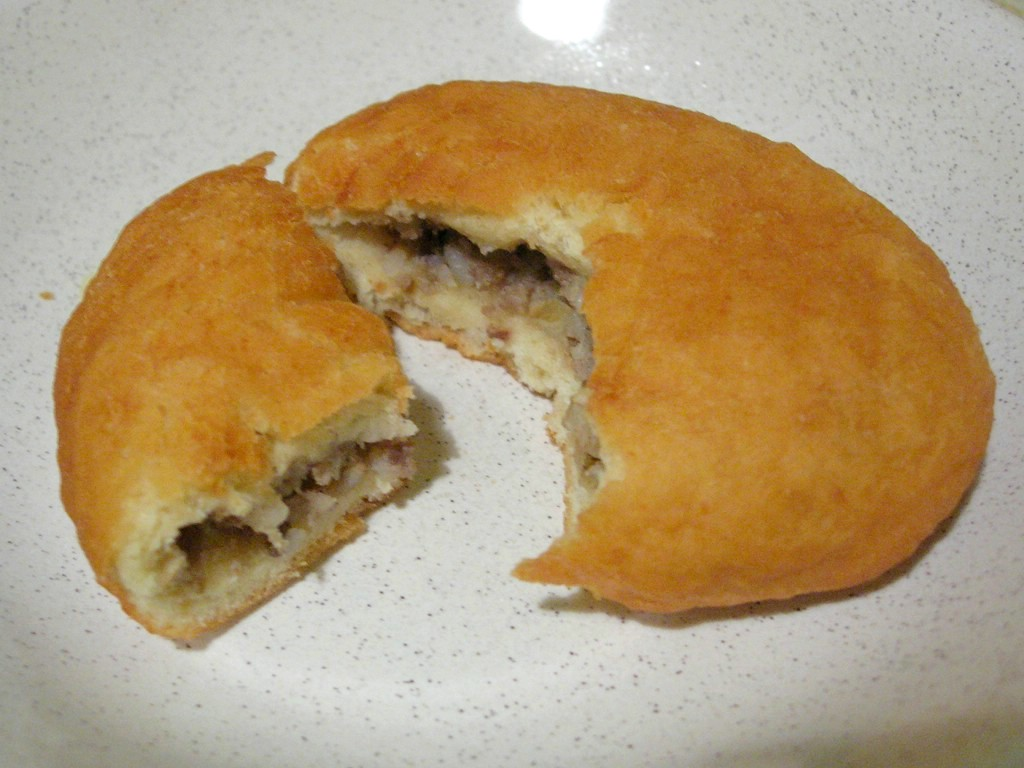
Lihapiirakka (meat pie) is a common street food in Finland.

Common meals are breakfast (aamupala), lunch (lounas), dinner (päivällinen) and supper (iltapala). Sometimes there is also an afternoon snack (välipala) or a coffee break where a light snack is served. In all primary and secondary schools, including high school, a hot free lunch is served as part of Finland's welfare state system. Lunch, eaten around noon, is usually a warm meal, although some people may select a lighter meal such as a sandwich or a salad. Taking a lunchbox is not as common as elsewhere in Europe. Universities also provide lunch for students, but contrary to primary and secondary schools, lunch in universities is not free of charge but subsidized.

Lunch typically consists of a single course with optional side salad, bread and dessert. Many workplaces have a lunch restaurant, and if not, employers often give lunch vouchers. Restaurants often have a separate lunch menu for this purpose. In the evening, the dinner is usually a hot meal, again with side dishes. Meals are usually single-course, commonly consisting of meat of some sort (pork, lamb, chicken, beef) and potatoes, rice or pasta with the meat. Soups, such as pea soup or fish soup, are not considered appetizers only, but may be served as lunch or dinner, and they are correspondingly heavier and come in larger portions.

Dinner is typically the most substantial meal of the day. However, it is served rather early at 5 pm, so that there is often a separate supper at 8-9 pm. This supper (iltapala) is a light snack.

=== Breakfast ===
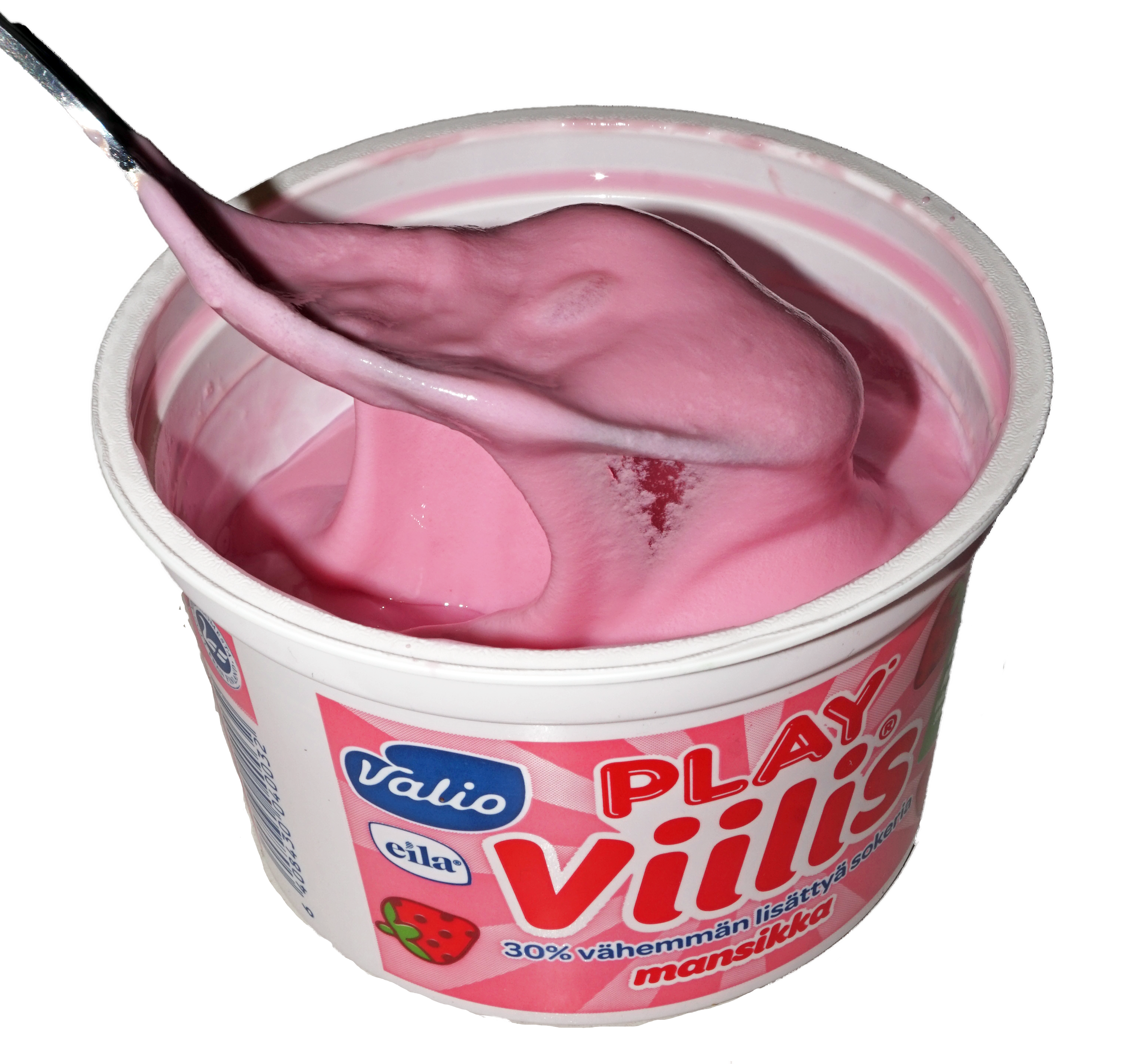
Valio Viilis (strawberry flavor)

Breakfast is seen as a substantial meal and usually consists of open sandwiches. The sandwich is often buttered, with savoury toppings such as hard cheese or cold cuts. Sour milk products such as yoghurt or viili are also common breakfast foods, usually served in a bowl with cereals such as corn flakes, muesli, and sometimes with sugar, fruit or jam. A third food that is commonly eaten at breakfast is porridge (puuro), often made of rolled oats, and eaten with a pat of butter (voisilmä, lit. 'butter eye') or with milk, or fruit or jam, especially the sort made of raspberries or strawberries (sometimes lingonberries). Drinks are milk, juice, tea, or coffee.

Pannukakku, a type of baked oven pancake, is considered a dessert in Finland, but is often eaten for breakfast in the Finnish diaspora in the United States and Canada.

=== Coffee breaks ===
Finland has the highest coffee consumption per capita in the world, averaging 12 kilograms (26 lb) of coffee per person annually. It is typical for a Finn to drink coffee continuously throughout the day, often accompanied by a sweet bun or a sandwich. Most workplaces allocate time for coffee breaks, and serving coffee is very likely to happen to a visitor to a private home. Finns consider this a small courtesy.

== Criticism ==
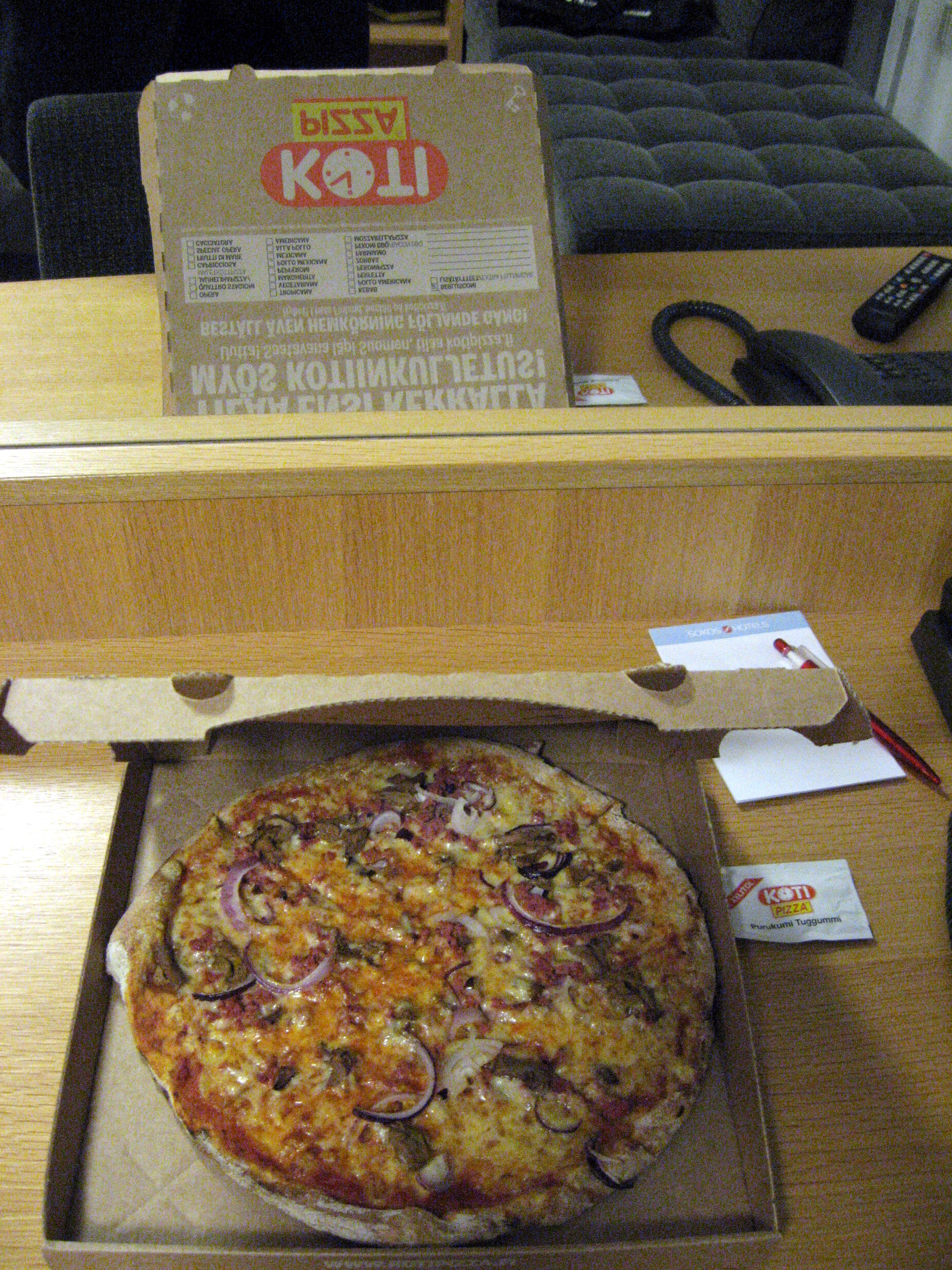
Pizza Berlusconi

In 2005, Finnish cuisine came under heavy fire from two leaders of countries renowned for their cuisines. The Italian prime minister Silvio Berlusconi claimed, "I've been to Finland and I had to endure the Finnish diet so I am in a position to make a comparison." Berlusconi started his anti-Finnish food campaign in 2001. He went on: "The Finns don't even know what prosciutto is." This followed the initial decision by the European Commission to establish the European Food Safety Authority in Helsinki. On 4 July 2005 French President Jacques Chirac claimed that "After Finland, [Britain is] the country with the worst food."

After Chirac's and Berlusconi's critiques, some international food reporters answered:

"Chirac and Berlusconi are wrong! Finnish cuisine is much more international than I expected. I have eaten very good food in wonderful restaurants, visited market places and enjoyed in good cafeterias. Cheese is very good in Finland. I also love Finnish cloudberry and smoked fish." (Ute Junker, Australian Financial Review Magazine, Sydney, Australia)

"Food in Finnish restaurants is extremely good. Especially I love Finnish salmon, mushroom soup and desserts. I have also got very good Finnish wines. The worldwide reputation of Finnish cuisine isn't very good – but it should be!" (Liliane Delwasse, Le Figaro, Paris, France)

"I have eaten only good food in Finland. Food in Finland is very fresh. Bread, berries, mushrooms and desserts are very delicious. Finnish berries (especially cloudberry), salmon, cheeses and reindeer should be available in London, too." (April Hutchinson, Abta Magazine, London, England).

Finnish pizza chain Kotipizza won the 2008 America's Plate International pizza contest in New York, while Italian-American pizza came in second. They named their award-winning smoked reindeer pizza Berlusconi as symbolic payback for the critique Finnish cuisine had received from the Italian prime minister earlier.

== See also ==
- Beer in Finland
- Culture of Finland
- Sami cuisine
- List of Christmas dishes
- Porilainen
- Swedish cuisine
- National Finnish Food Day
