= Lohikeitto =

Nordic salmon and potato dish with carrots and leeks

Salmon soup (Lohikeitto)
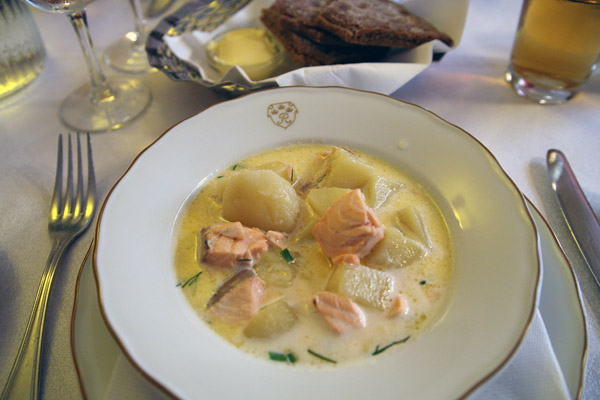
- Alternative names: Creamy salmon soup, laxsoppa
- Type: Soup
- Place of origin: Finland
- Main ingredients: Salmon fillets, potatoes, leeks

Salmon chowder (Finnish: lohikeitto [ˈlohiˌkei̯tːo], Swedish: laxsoppa) is a common dish in Finland and other Nordic countries. It consists of salmon fillets, boiled potatoes, carrots and leeks. The dish is served hot, and typically seasoned with fresh dill, allspice, salt and black pepper. The soup is made with cream or whole milk, making it a chowder with a creamy flavour and texture.

== See also ==
- Finnish cuisine
- List of fish dishes
- List of soups
