= Kakko =

Kakko may refer to:

- Kakko (instrument), a Japanese double-headed drum
- Kakko (bread), a type of Finnish bread baked mostly in the region of Satakunta

== People ==
- Kakko (singer) (born 1969), Japanese actress and singer
- Kakko of Friuli (died 617), joint duke of Friuli

=== People with the surname ===
- Erik Kakko (born 1971), Finnish ice hockey player
- Kaapo Kakko (born 2001), Finnish ice hockey player
- Minea Blomqvist-Kakko (born 1985), Finnish golfer
- Roope Kakko (born 1982), Finnish golfer
- Tony Kakko (born 1975), Finnish singer-songwriter
