= National Finnish Food Day =

Early Life

The National Finnish Food Day (Finnish: Suomalaisen ruoan päivä, Swedish: Finländska matens dag) is a day celebrating Finnish food, observed on 4 September. It was launched in 2019 by the organisation behind the Finnish label-of-origin Hyvää Suomesta ('Produce of Finland'), together with the over 300 food producers certified to use the Hyvää Suomesta label on their food packaging.

The National Finnish Food Day seeks to promote food produced in Finland, as well as the food producers, and to raise the awareness of Finnish food among consumers.
