= Sultsina =

Karelian pastry

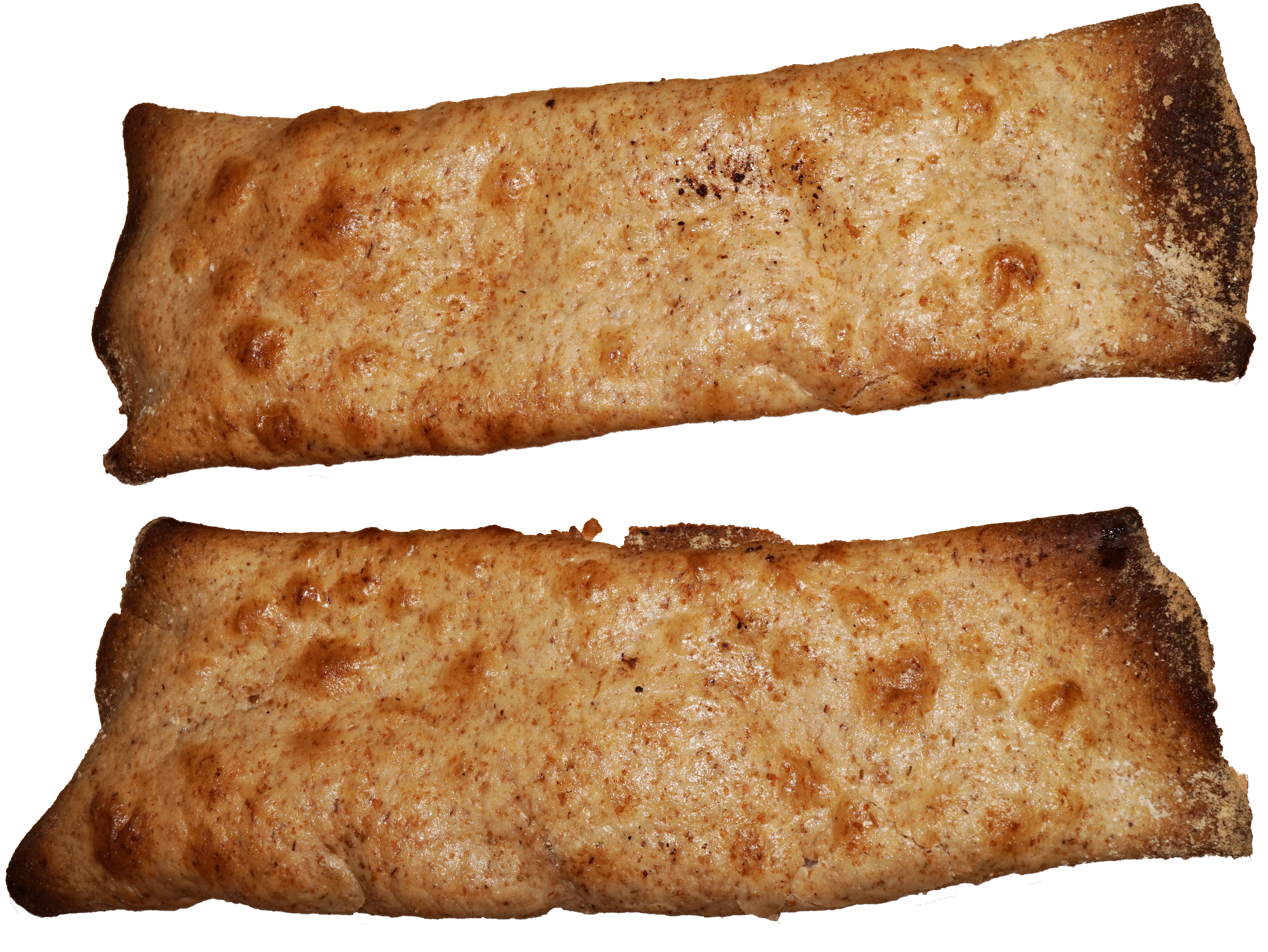
Sultsina

Sultsina (Karelian: šul’ččina, Livvi: sul’čin) is a traditional Karelian dish, a cross between a crêpe and a flatbread, made of unleavened rye dough and a farina (mannapuuro) filling. Rice pudding can also be used as a filling.

The stiff dough is formed by mixing rye flour and water and rolling to form thin circles, much like for Karelian pasties. It is then cooked directly on a clean burner or in a dry frying pan or griddle, on relatively high heat. One or both sides are then basted with melted butter or a mixture of melted butter and water and then stacked upon one another. The filling is then spread over the pastry, leaving the edges exposed and the sultsina is folded, bringing one side to the middle, the other side over that. The sultsina is then cut in half. Like most traditional Karelian pastries, sultsinas are best when eaten fresh as they do not keep well.
