= Vispipuuro =

Traditional Scandinavian breakfast

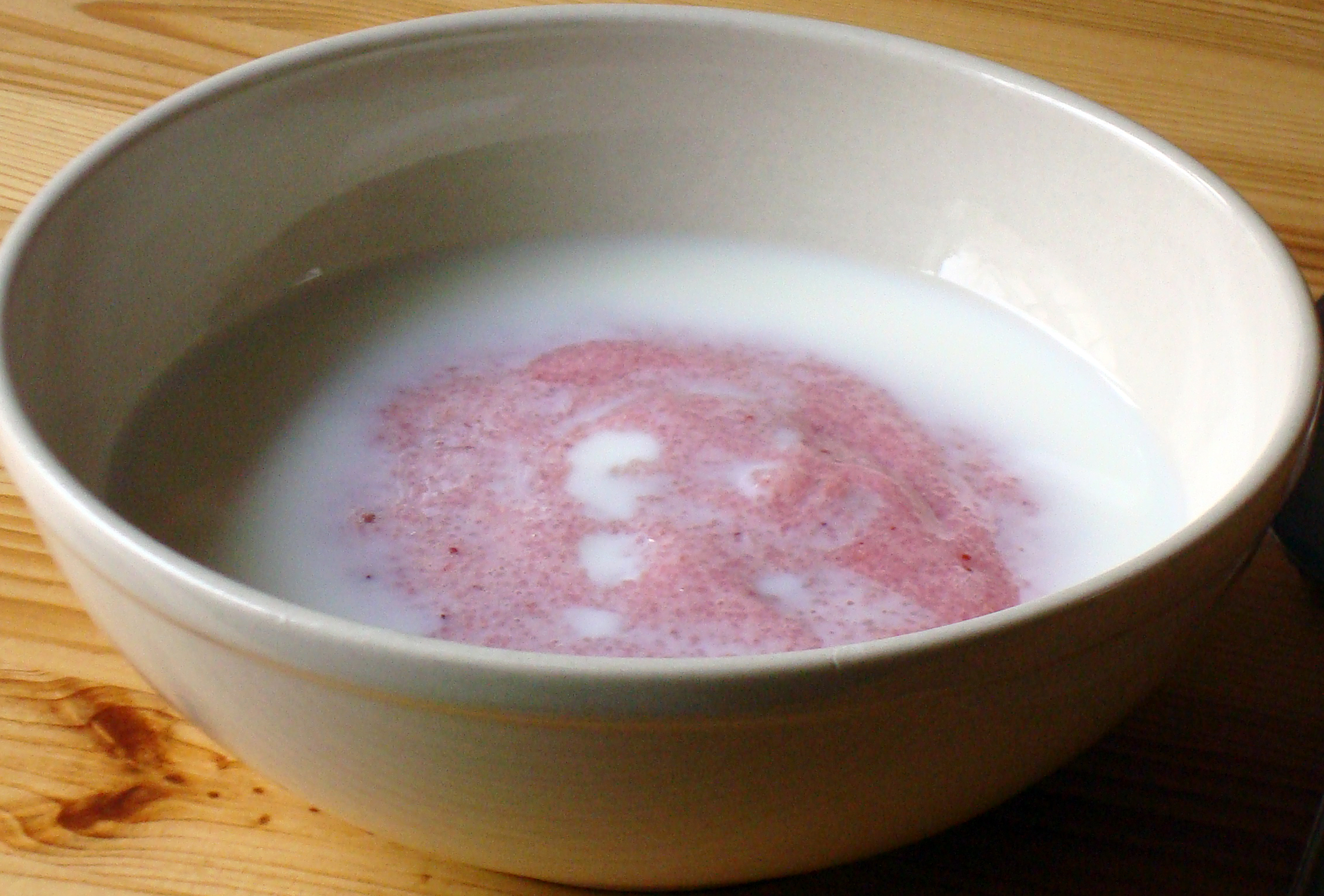
- Type: Porridge
- Course: Dessert
- Place of origin: Finland, Norway, Sweden, Estonia, Latvia
- Region or state: Northern Europe
- Main ingredients: Wheat semolina, berries (usually lingonberries)

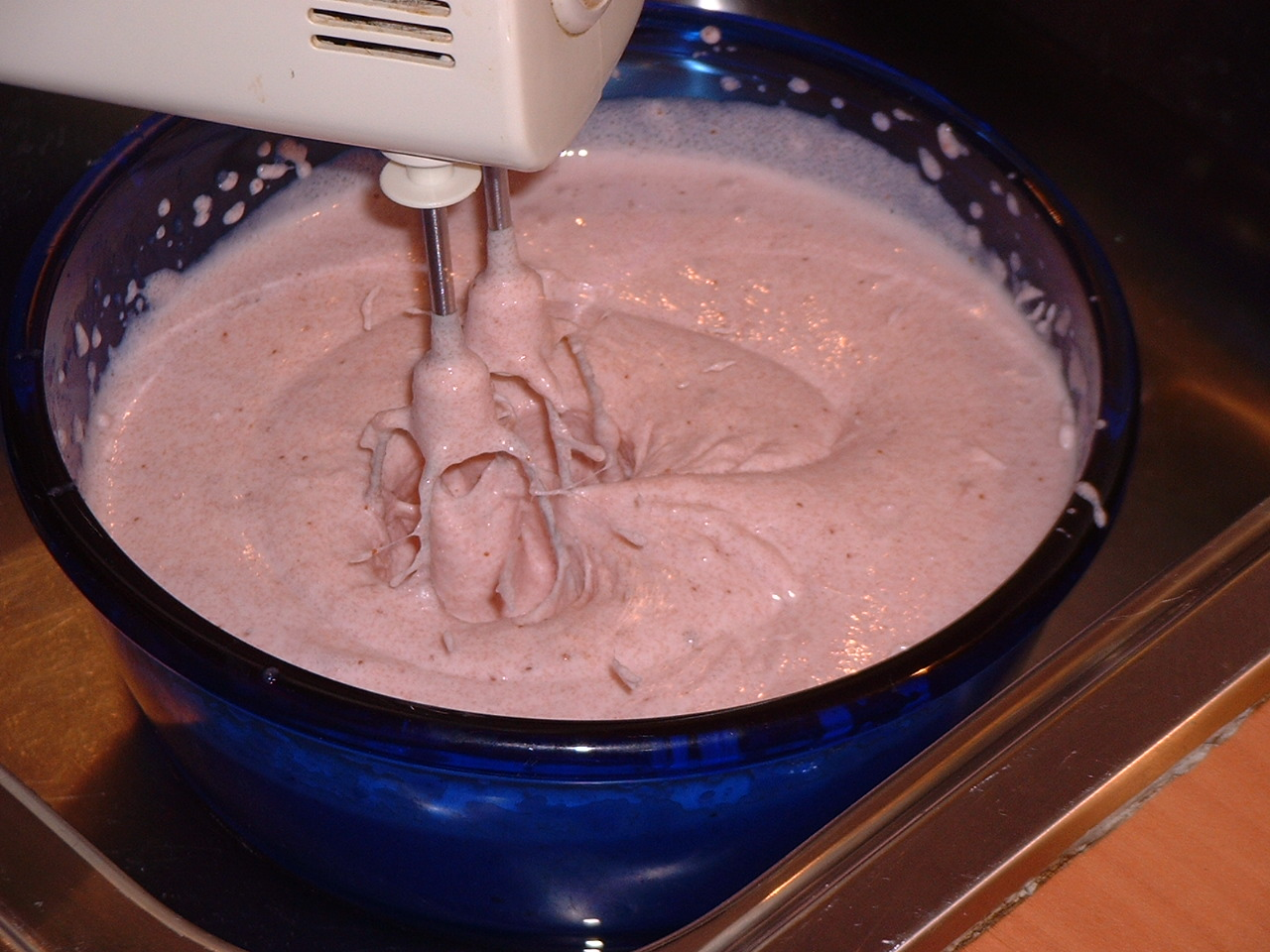
Whisking while it is cooling down in water filled kitchen sink

Vispipuuro (Finnish: [ˈʋispiˌpuːro], "whipped porridge"), russedessert (Norwegian name), vispgröt/klappgröt/klappkräm (Swedish name), debesmanna (Latvian name, "sky-semolina"), or mannavaht (Estonian name) is a sweet, wheat semolina (manna) cold porridge made with berries, usually lingonberries.

Vispipuuro is mostly used as a breakfast dish for children, and more rarely eaten as a dessert.

Vispipuuro is eaten in Finland, Norway, Sweden, Latvia, and Estonia. The main ingredients are usually semolina, berries, and sugar or other sweeteners.

In Sweden, it is usually made by adding lingonberry cordial to the water, in which the semolina is cooked, as the texture is supposed to be smooth, without little bits of berry in the porridge. Alternatively, the berries are strained out before the semolina is added. After the mixture has cooled down, the porridge is vigorously whipped to a light, mousse-like consistency. Alternatively, the porridge pot can be put in the kitchen sink, partially filled with cold water and whisked in the pot, so it cools down while being whisked with a hand mixer. The dessert is usually served with milk and optionally sugar. Other berries and fruit that can be used are redcurrants, cranberries, apricots, gooseberries and strawberries. The name "russe" may refer to the color after it has been whipped or indicate that the dessert may have a connection with Russia.

== See also ==
- List of porridges
