= Rönttönen =

Finnish pie

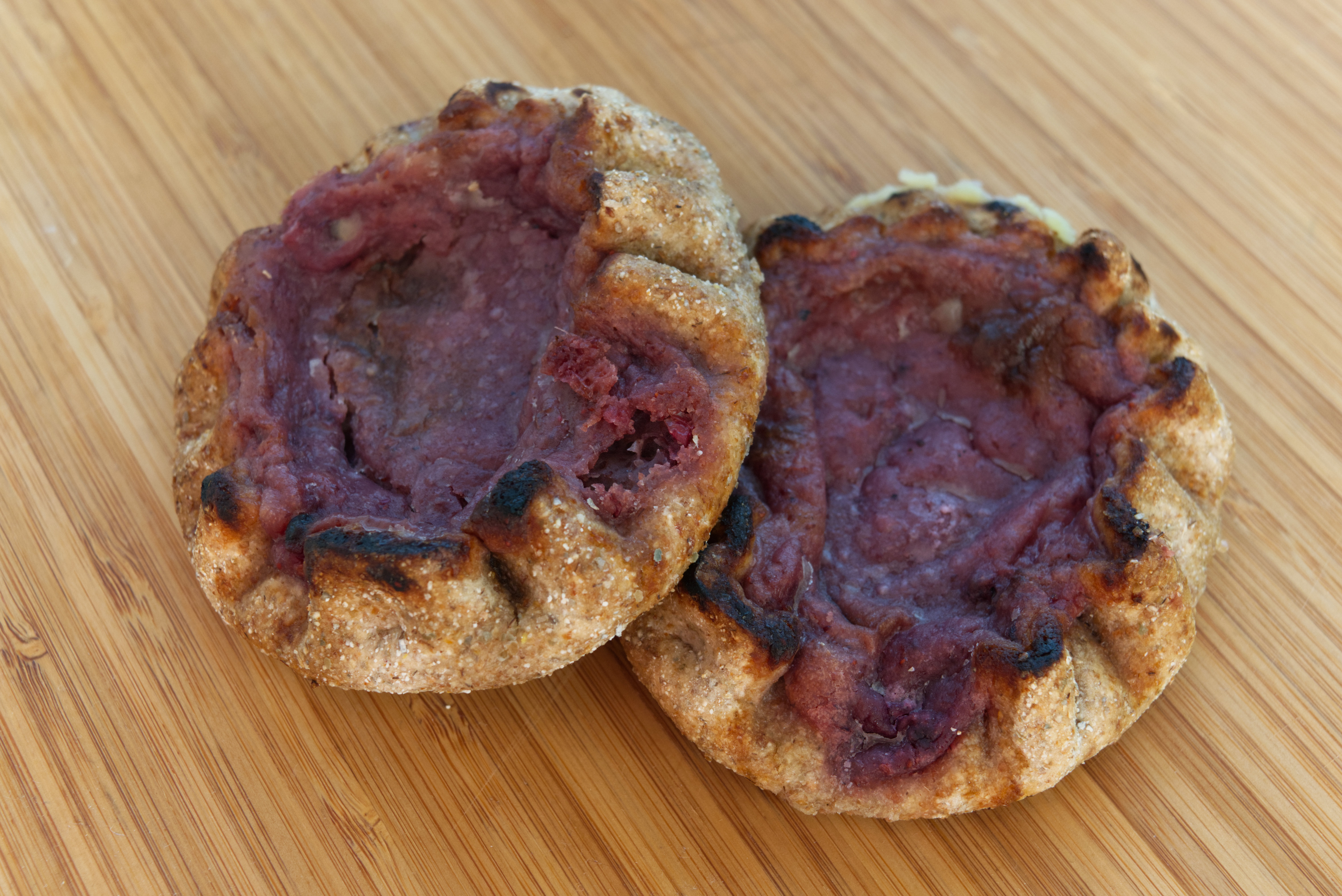
- Rönttönens.
- Type: Pie
- Place of origin: Finland
- Region or state: Kainuu
- Main ingredients: Barley or rye dough, mashed potatoes, berries (usually lingonberry)

A rönttönen (Finnish pronunciation: [ˈrøntːønen]) is a traditional sweet Finnish delicacy from the region of Kainuu.

A small (about the size of the palm of a hand) open faced pie consisting of a crust made of barley or rye dough, filled with a sweetened mashed potato and berry (most often lingonberry) filling.

Typically, it is served as an accompaniment to a coffee.

The Kainuun rönttönen has a protected geographical indication under the EU law.
