= Aakkoset =

Finnish candy brand

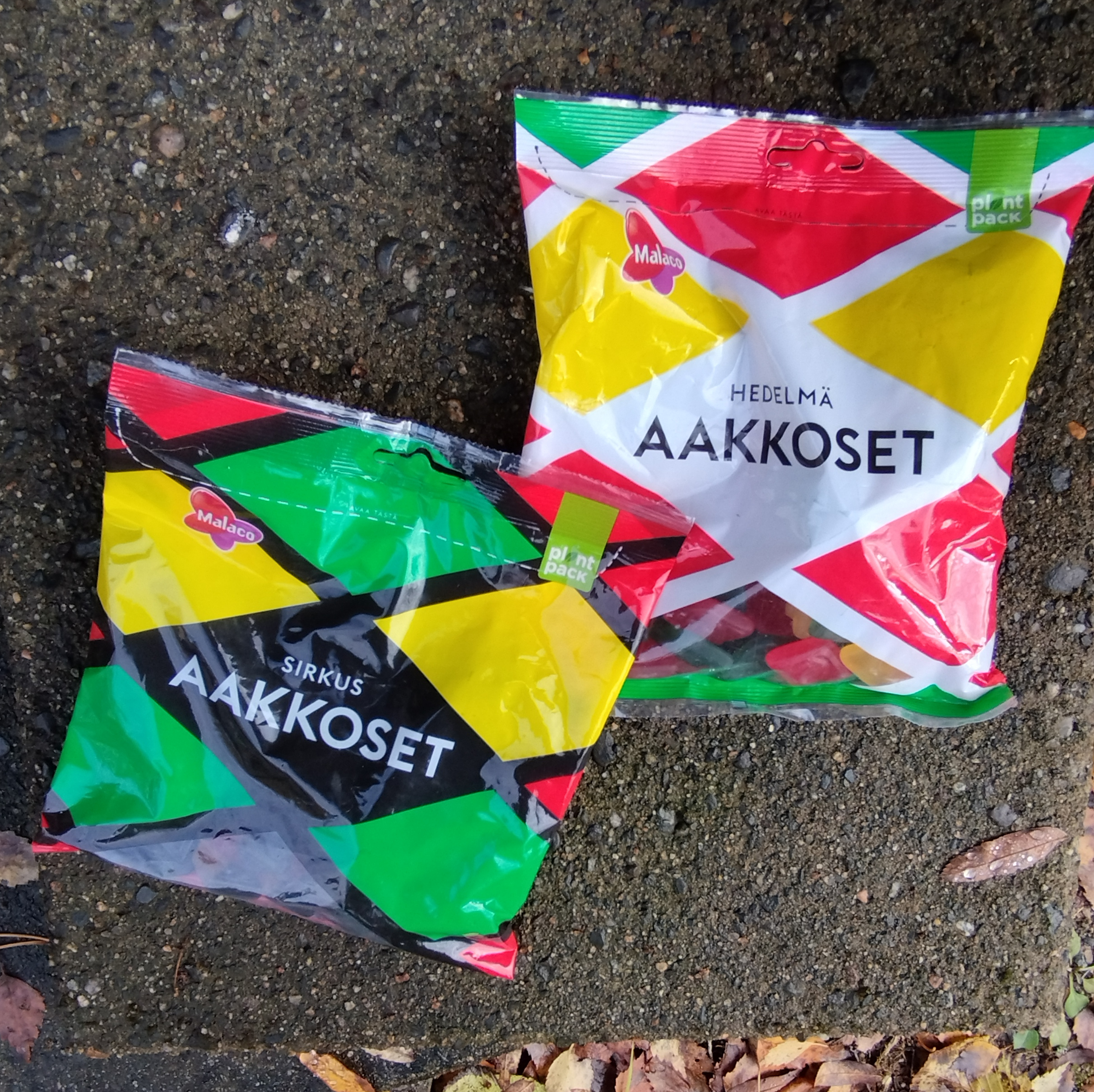
Aakkoset Sirkus and Aakkoset Hedelmä candy bags

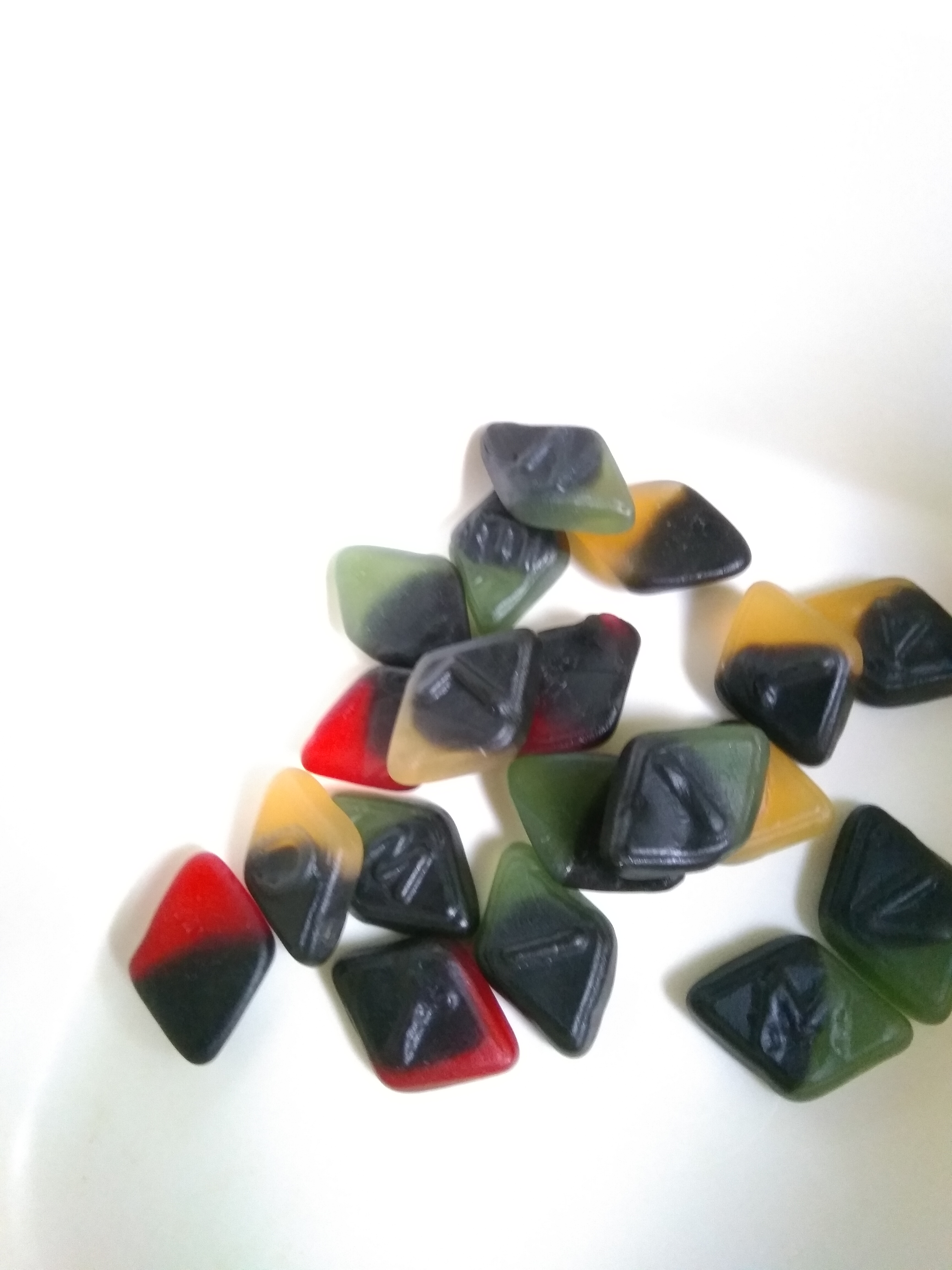
Circus Aakkoset candy.

Aakkoset (Finnish for "alphabet") is a Finnish brand of candy sold in Finland since 1970, currently sold by Cloetta under the Malaco brand name. The name "Aakkoset" comes from the various capital letters of the alphabet decorating the lozenge-shaped candies.

There are several different varieties and bag sizes available. Aakkoset is one of Cloetta's most popular brands of candy and one of the best selling brands of candy of the S Group and Kesko.

In 2019 there were six varieties of Aakkoset: Choco, Fruit, Berry, Salty Liquorice, Circus and Fruit & Foam. There is also Jenkki chewing gum under the name Aakkoset available. Aakkoset is Finland's oldest domestic salty liquorice candy sold in bags.

== History ==
Hellas brought Aakkoset onto the market in 1970. Salty liquorice had grown more popular in the 1960s, when Chymos introduced Pantteri. Hellas also had its own salty liquorice candy. In the early 1970s consumption of candy grew more common as kiosks started selling loose candy. The book Salmiakki from 2001 mentions Aakkoset, Super Salmiakki and Pirate coins as symbols of this era.

In 1982 Kassu Halonen composed and wrote the music to the Aakkoset commercial starring Helena Lindgren.

In 1995 the content of the Aakkoset bag was changed and the mix had three different flavours, from a more liquorice-intense flavour to a flavour with higher ammonium chloride content. Sales increased temporarily, but customer feedback caused a return to the original flavour.

In 2000, the three best selling salty liquorice candies in Finland were Pantteri by Fazer, Aakkoset by Leaf and Salmiakki by Halva.

Leaf, a later producer of Aakkoset, fused with Cloetta in 2011.

In 2014 the best-selling candy bags of the S Group were various mixes such as Aakkoset, Remix, Tutti Frutti + Choco and Pirate coins.

In 2016 Cloetta's best selling candy bags were TV Mix Original, Circus Aakkoset, Fruit Aakkoset and Lauantaipussi ("Saturday candy bag"). In 2017 Circus Aakkoset was the second-best selling brand of loose candy in Finland. The Circus Aakkoset bag weighing 315 grams was the third-best selling candy bag of the S Group and the sixth-best selling candy bag of Kesko.

Circus Aakkoset was the eighth-best selling brand of loose candy of the S Group.

== Flavours ==
In 2019 there were six flavours of Aakkoset available: Choco, Fruit, Salty Liquorice, Circus, Fruit & Foam and the new flavour Berry. There is also Jenkki chewing gum with the Aakkoset brand available. Salty Liquorice Aakkoset has a mild ammonium chloride content.

== Discontinued flavours ==
The Cloetta marketing chief was asked in 2016 which of the company's previous flavours was most sought to bring back. The winner was the Aakkoset Sweet and Sour mix from the early 2000s.

In 2018 the Emoji Aakkoset mix bag was introduced, including watermelon, cola, grapefruit, blueberry, orange, peach, mango and strawberry flavoured candies. The bag was no longer on the market in 2019.

== Production ==
Aakkoset is produced by molding, where the candies are shaped in gypsum molds, which are pressed into the candy mass by a machine. In the process starch syrup, sugar, starch and thickening agent are mixed in water and aromas and colouring is added to the mix. The prepared mix is poured on a plank surface covered with corn starch powder. From this surface the candies are moved to a drying closet for one or two days, after which the powder is removed and the candies are shined before packing.
