= Leaf International =

Defunct confectionery company

Leaf International BV
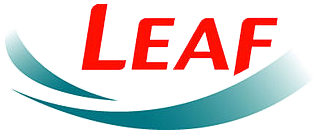
- Type: Private
- Industry: Confectionery
- Founded: 1940; 86 years ago
- Founder: Sol S. Leaf
- Defunct: February 2012; 14 years ago
- Fate: Merged into Cloetta
- Successor: Leaf Brands
- Headquarters: Oosterhout, Netherlands; Stockholm, Sweden
- Key people: Bengt Baron (CEO, 2009–11)
- Products: Candy, chewing gum, pastilles, trading cards
- Revenue: €527m (2010)
- Owner: CVC Capital Partners; Nordic Capital
- Number of employees: 2,400

Leaf International BV was a confectionery company founded in the 1940s. Leaf had sales of approximately €527m (2010) and 2,400 employees. It had 11 factories in seven countries. Leaf was owned by CVC Capital Partners, Nordic Capital, and management. Bengt Baron was the CEO of Leaf.

After several mergers and acquisitions Leaf merged with the Swedish confectionery company Cloetta, and dropped the Leaf name.

Leaf was also notable for its trading cards, more specifically the baseball cards sets, with the first of them released in 1948.

== History ==
The company was founded by Sol S. Leaf in Chicago, Illinois, in the 1940s. Its history includes a number of mergers, acquisitions, and divisions, as well as several name changes.

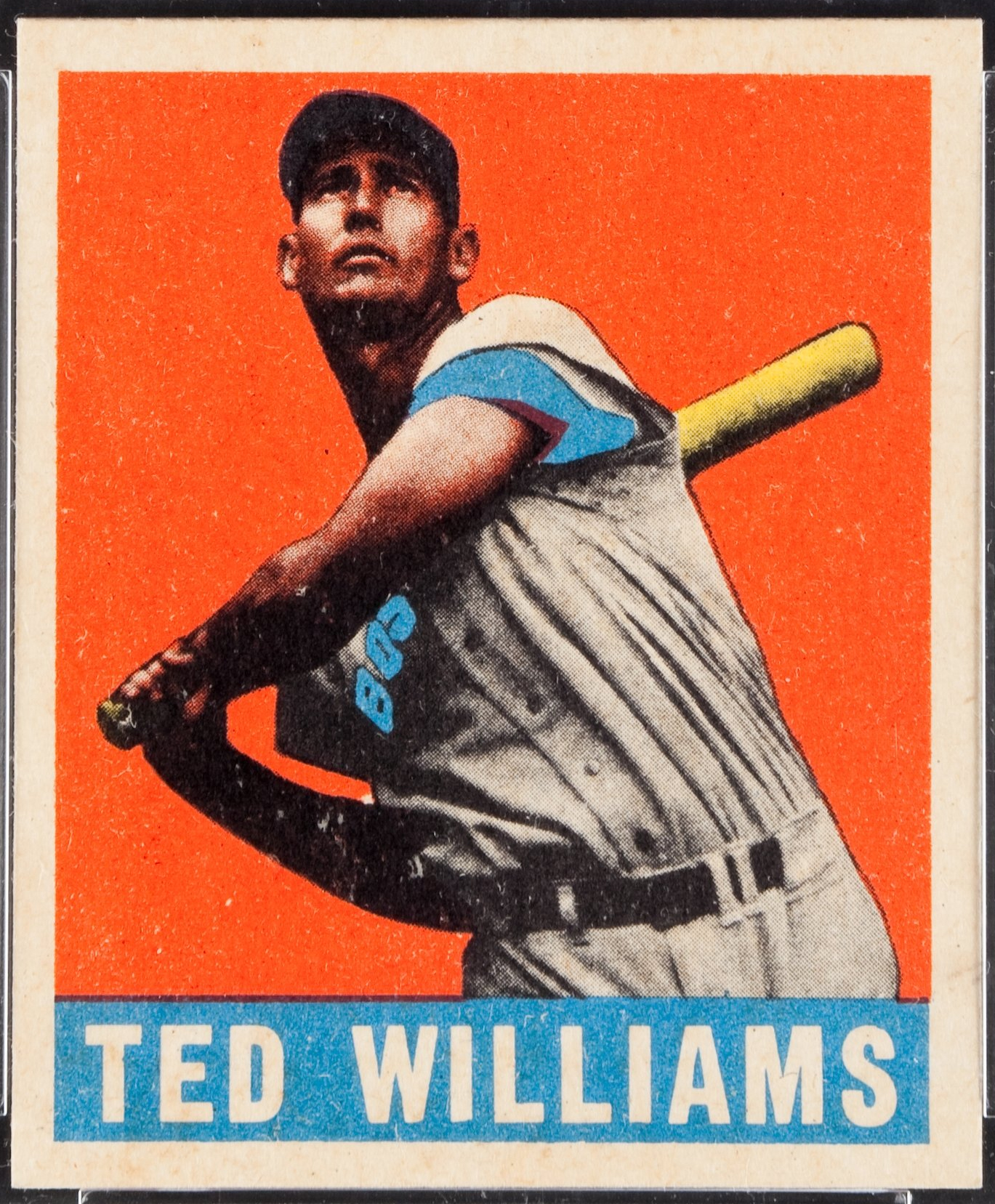
1948 Ted Williams baseball card. This set was the first post-World War II set in full color

In 1940, the Leaf Confectionery Company introduced Rain-Blo Bubble Gum. In 1947, the Overland Candy Company (makers of Whoppers brand malted milk candy) merged with the Chicago Biscuit Company, Leaf Confectionary Company, and Leaf Machinery to form Leaf Brands. In 1948, Leaf issued its first set of baseball cards, the first post-World War II color set. In 1949, Leaf Brands reintroduced Whoppers' Malted Milk Balls.

In the 1960s, Whoppers Malted Milk Balls brand and other products manufactured by Leaf Brands were purchased by W. R. Grace and Company, which sold them back in 1976.

In 1983, Leaf acquired Jolly Rancher. Also in 1983, the Leaf Candy Company in Illinois was purchased by Huhtamäki Oyj of Helsinki, Finland, who merged it with Phoenix Candy (the maker of Now and Later) and another candy company it had acquired, all under the Leaf name. Huhtamäki Oyj acquired the Donruss trading card division of General Mills at about the same time and merged it into Leaf.

In 1986, Leaf purchased some confectionery brands from Beatrice Foods, maker of Milk Duds. Also in 1986, Leaf, Inc. sold Phoenix Candy to Kouri Capital, a Finnish investment firm, changing its name to Phoenix Confections.

In 1988, Hollywood Brands, maker of Payday and Zero, was purchased from Sara Lee by Huhtamäki Oyj and became part of Leaf, Inc. In 1989, the Heath bar was purchased by Leaf.

In the 1990s, Leaf became one of the world's top-ten confectionery companies; it was especially strong in non-chocolate products such as pastilles and chewing gum. By 1993, Leaf was the fourth largest candy producer in North America.

In 1996, the Hershey Foods Corporation acquired the Leaf North American confectionery operations from Huhtamäki Oyj. Over the next few years, Leaf manufacturing and sales became integrated into existing Hershey manufacturing and sales operations, effectively ending Leaf's existence as a separate operating unit in the US.

In 1999, Leaf's European and Asian business, with brands such as Läkerol, Jenkki, and Sportlife, was sold to the Dutch company CSM, which added the brands to their confectionery unit, which already included Malaco, Red Band, and Venco. In 2000, CSM acquired Continental Sweets with market positions in France, Belgium, the Netherlands, and the UK. In 2001, CSM acquired Socalbe, based in Italy, along with brands such as Dietorelle and Dietor.

In 2005, CSM sold its confectionery unit to two private equity firms, CVC Capital Partners and Nordic Capital, that restored the Leaf name and continue to own the company today. In 2007, Leaf acquired Cadbury Italy, including the brand Saila, which originated from Warner Lambert's Confectionary Division. The company acquired Leaf Holland B.V in May 2010. In February 2012, Leaf's merger with the Swedish confectionery company Cloetta (that had been announced in December 2011) was completed.

== Products ==
Leaf products included sugared and sugar-free gum, pastilles, candy, liquorices, peppermints, chocolates, nougats, sweeteners and chews.

== Brands ==
At the moment of the merger, Leaf owned the following brands:

- Red Band (Netherlands)
- Läkerol (Sweden)
- Malaco (Sweden)
- Saila (Italy)
- Sportlife (Netherlands, Belgium)
- Jenkki (Finland)
- Chewits (United Kingdom)
- Xylifresh (Netherlands)
- King (Netherlands)
- Sisu (Finland)
- Dietor (Italy)
- Galatine (Italy)
- Sperlari (Italy)
- Tupla (Finland)
- Mynthon (Finland)
- Dietorelle (Italy)
- Venco (Netherlands)
- Ahlgrens bilar (Sweden)
