= Sisu (candy) =

Finnish confectionery brand

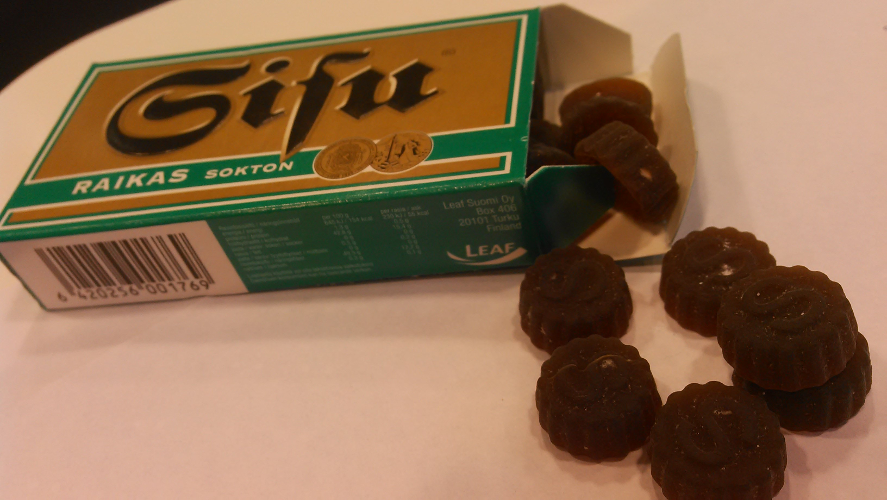
Sisu pastilles and their packaging made by Cloetta in spring 2015

Sisu is a Finnish brand of candy, currently produced by Leaf International.

Sisu was introduced to the market in 1928 by the Turku candy company Tehdas-Osakeyhtiö Seres (later Oy Seres Ab). Development of the candy was begun one year earlier by the Seres chemist Johan Ponkamo, with the intention of developing a candy to match the Swedish Läkerol. For assistance, he used a recipe for wine gum tablets containing gum arabic he had found from a German book. Combining gum arabic and liquorice to form a candy with satisfactory composition proved difficult and time-consuming work. The special Sisu aroma was only born after countless attempts and experiments. Its composition is and remains a closely guarded secret.

Directly after its introduction to the market, Sisu won a gold medal at the international food products fair in Liège, Belgium. A picture of the medal won by Sisu was placed on the front side of the candy box and has been there ever since.

== Name and logo ==
The inventor of the name "Sisu" and its exact moment of conception are not known. Most probably the name was the result of group work at the Seres factory, like many other names of the factory's products. Sisu was a term clearly in fashion in the 1920s. The Sisu packaging and logo was developed by Arnold Tilgmann (1902–1978), 25 years at the time, and working in Turun Kivipaino. The Sisu logo has remained the same since the 1920s. The name "Sisu", printed in old Fraktur typeface in the logo (with the long s), may be mistaken as "Gifu" among those not familiar with the blackletter characters.

== Advertising of Sisu ==
Sisu became a favourite of Finns in the 1930s with very little advertising. The candy was particularly recommended for singers, orators and smokers, in practice it was a popular breath refresher and cough medicine. In the 1950s and 1960s, advertisements for Sisu could be seen in the local press, occasionally in nationwide newspapers, such as Suomen Kuvalehti. The same advertisement images were used for several years, sometimes even for several decades.

A new era began in advertising in the middle of the 1970s, when Sisu began to be advertised on television. The classic advertisement with the slogan "In the beginning, there was a swamp, a hoe and Jussi" was made by the advertisement company Lintas. The advertisement was an instant favourite among the Finnish public, and it was even broadcast in the 1980s.

In the late 1980s, owned by Rettig Group, advertising Sisu was closely connected to ice hockey. The new owner Leaf also continued with the ice hockey theme. Sisu's ice hockey campaign culminated in Finland's world championship in ice hockey in spring 1995. Sisu ice hockey cards came to the Finnish market in 1993. The cards were published until 1996.

On Sisu's 70th birthday in 1998, celebratory advertisements featured the mountaineer Veikka Gustafsson. Gustafsson, along with Patrick Degerman, had been the first to climb one of the tallest mountains on the Antarctic. The mountain was named Mount Sisu.

Advertising of Sisu has been closely attached to rock music festivals since the launch of the Sisu Horna candy in 2002. In 2007, Sisu began sponsoring the power metal band Sturm und Drang, founded in 2004 in Vaasa and consisting of Finland-Swedish young musicians from 16 to 17 years.

== Different flavours of Sisu ==
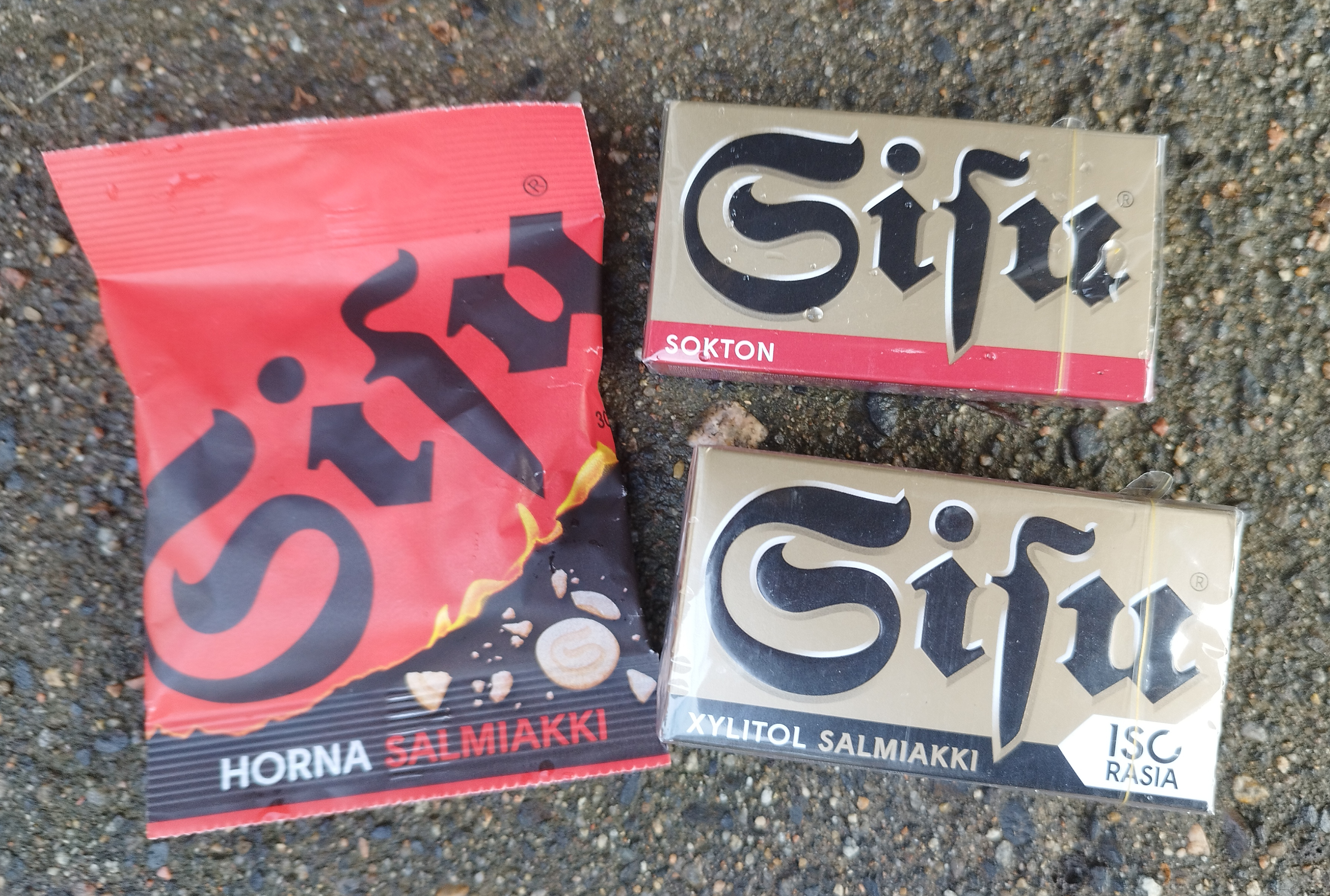
Sisu products in the 2020s

In the 1970s, a version of Sisu sweetened with sorbitol was introduced to the market. The candy had already been marketed as sugarless, but according to law, candy sweetened with sorbitol could not be marketed as sugarless. Therefore, Sisu developed a new term "Sokton". In the early 1970s, a sugarless version of Sisu and a version sweetened with xylitol, developed in connection with the dentistry department of the University of Turku, were introduced to the market.

The first new version of Sisu produced by Leaf was Salmiakki-Sisu, launched in 1994, which immediately became Finland's most sold salty liquorice candy. Production of sugared Sisu was stopped in 1998. In the 2000s, various new flavours of Sisu have been produced. One of the most popular is Sisu Horna, which is different in composition and sold in small paper bags. Sisu Horna is sweetened with sugar. A new version introduced in the celebratory year 2008 is the liquorice-flavoured Sisu Sysi.

== Producers of Sisu ==
The Seres factory was located in Hämeenkatu in Turku in 1928, after which production shifted to Rauhankatu in 1938. The Seres factory was owned by the Kaukopaasi and Ponkamo families until the 1970s, when it was sold to Rettig Group, known as a tobacco factory. A new factory was opened in Aura in 1973, where Sisu was produced until 2013. Instead, Sisu's owners have changed: Rettig Group sold its candy business to Huhtamäki in 1992, and so Sisu became part of Leaf, owned by Huhtamäki. In 1999, Sisu became owned by the Dutch CSM. Nowadays, Leaf and Sisu are owned by the international investors CVC Capital Partners and Nord Capital, and the production was moved to Italy in 2013.

== See also ==
- List of breath mints

== Sources ==
- Rauno Lehtinen: Sisulla siitä selviää! Atena, 2008. ISBN 978-951-796-519-4
