= Mynthon =

Finnish brand of pastilles

- Product type: Pastilles
- Current owner: Cloetta
- Produced by: Cloetta
- Country: Finland
- Introduced: 1970s
- Markets: Finland, Baltic countries, Sweden, Norway, Denmark
- Previous owners: Merijal, Leaf
- Website: www.mynthon.com

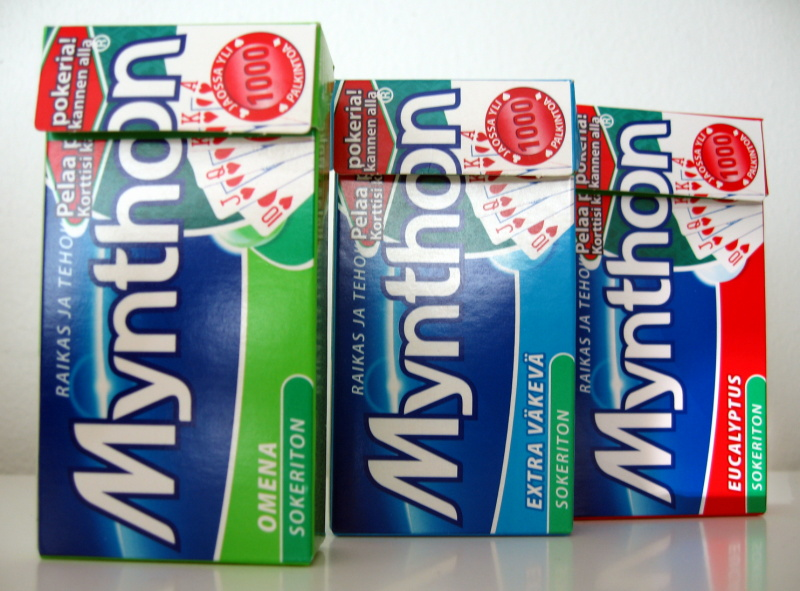
Boxes of Mynthon pastilles.

Mynthon is a Finnish brand of pastilles owned by Cloetta. It has been produced since the 1970s. Mynthon is the best selling brand of pastilles in Finland with a market share of about 30%: its annual sales are about 22 million items. As well as Finland, Mynthon is sold in the Baltic countries, Sweden, Norway and Denmark. The pastilles are especially used to relieve a sore throat.

== History ==
Mynthon was launched in the 1970s, when it was produced by the company Merijal from Oulu. Merijal was fused with Leaf in 1992. Leaf produced the pastilles in Turku, later also in St. Petersburg in Russia. Currently the pastilles are produced in Slovakia.

Mynthon was a long-time favourite among Leaf's products, and was one of the best-selling brands of pastilles in eastern Europe and a market leader in the Baltic countries. For example, in 2003 Mynthon was the second-most popular brand of pastilles in Russia. In the early 2000s, Russia was Leaf's single most important export country and Mynthon pastilles were its most important export product. In 2008, Mynthon was Finland's second-most popular brand of pastilles, after Sisu, also produced by Leaf. Leaf's share of Finland's pastille market was about 70% at the time.

In 2010 Mynthon's share of the Finnish market for pastilles was about 30%.

== Flavours ==
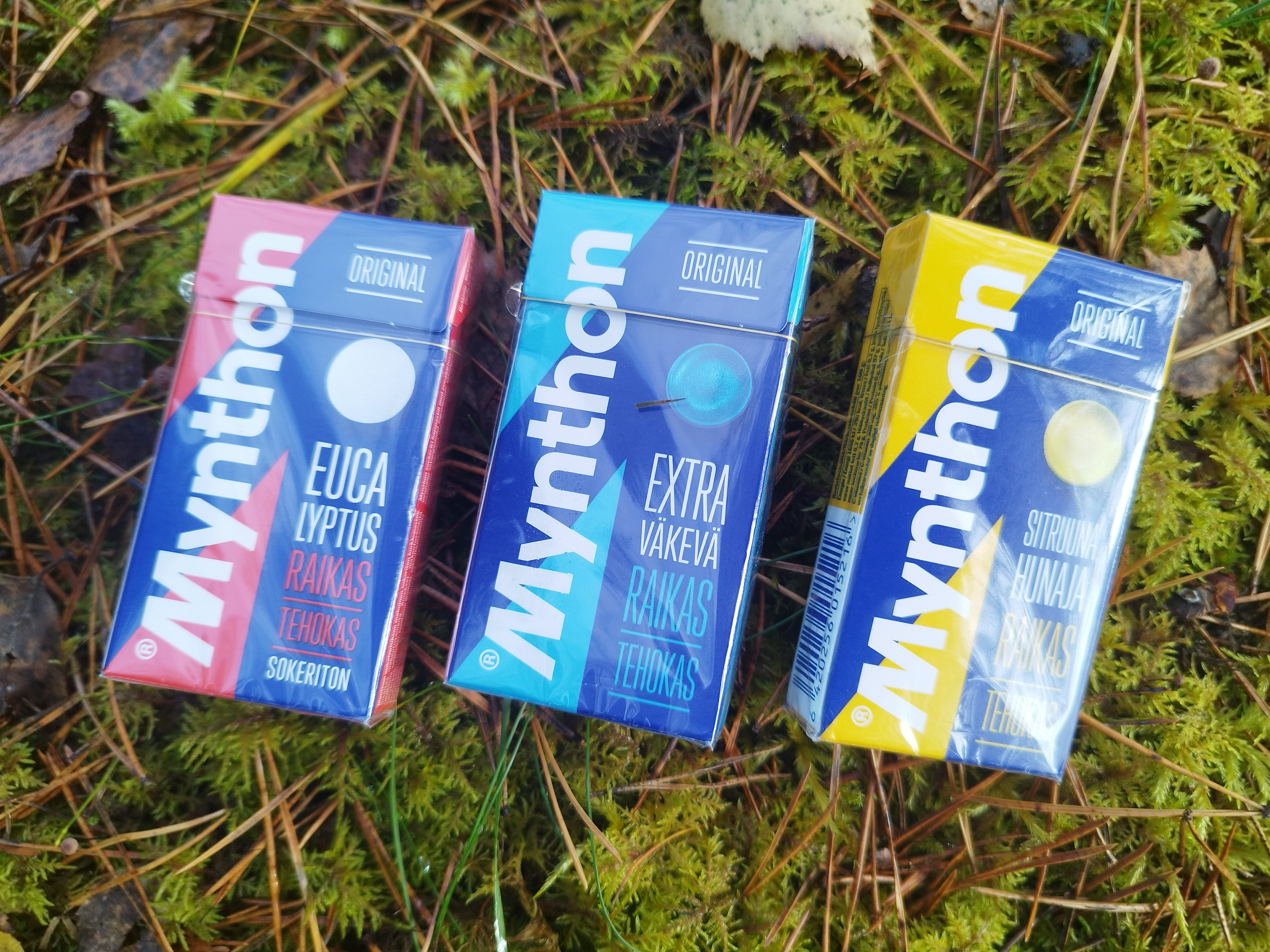
Mynthon packages in 2020s

Mynthon is sold in various flavours, such as eucalyptus, menthol, cola, fruits and berries, both sweetened with sugar and without.

In 2012 Mynthon pastilles came in three versions: Original, Kaira and Spring. The Original version was sold in eight flavours in packages from 31 to 39 grams, Kaira in two flavours in 25 gram packages and Spring in three flavours in packages from 31 to 34 grams.

In 2016 the pastilles were sold in the following versions:

- Xylitol products: Mynthon Xylitol Menthol (31 g), Mynthon Xylitol Cool Mint (31 g) and Mynthon Xylitol EucaMenthol calcium+B (30 g).
- Sugarfree products: Mynthon Extra Strong Sugarfree (35 g), Mynthon Eucalyptus Sugarfree (35 g), Mynthon Cool Mint Sugarfree (35 g), Mynthon C Blackcurrant Sugarfree (31 g), Mynthon C Apple Sugarfree (31 g), Mynthon Extra Strong Sugarfree (85 g), Mynthon Cool Mint Sugarfree (85 g), Mynthon Extra Strong Sugarfree 4-pack (140 g).
- Other products: Mynthon Zip Mint Euca-mint (30 g), Mynthon Zip Mint Menthol (30 g), Mynthon Extra Strong (39 g), Mynthon C Lemon-Honey (39 g), Mynthon C Lemon-Honey (85 g), Mynthon Salty Liquorice (85 g), Mynthon Cool Mint 4-pack (140 g), Mynthon Peppermint (60 g), Mynthon Fresh Breath Aqua Menthol (18.8 g).

Mynthon also came in three flavours of chewing gum: Mynthon Fresh Breath Aqua Menthol chewing gum (44 g), Mynthon Fresh Breath Ice Citrus chewing gum (44 g) and Mynthon Cool Mint chewing gum (44 g).

In 2017, cola-flavoured Mynthon was introduced.

== Marketing ==
In 2010 marketing Mynthon moved from Dynamo Advertising to Skandaali.

In 2015 a promotional video for Mynthon was made, where the beauty contestant Sara Chafak proposed kisses for men in an elevator in a candid camera session. The video received negative feedback and its idea was questioned. Two days after the publication of the video the Mynthon Facebook page said that the video will be discontinued: "Humour is an art and we failed to convey the message we wanted."

In May 2016 the band Teflon Brothers published a video announcing it was changing its name to Mynthon Brothers. The video referred to the artist Pyhimys's way of gathering various new projects for himself: "Nää on taas näit Pyhin juttui, en mä tiedä, mist se oikein tulee" ("This is yet another of Pyhi[mys]'s things, I don't know where it is coming from"), commented Heikki Kuula. Pyhimys explained the change of name by saying that the rap artist Snoop Dogg had changed his name to Snoop Lion and the musician Bruno had changed his name to Bruno Mars, and the reason for both of them was "clearly co-operation with chocolate bar brands".

The video also starred Cloetta's CEO Ville Perho, who had signed an agreement that the band took responsibility of marketing the brand. "We want that Mynthon also appeals to the younger target audience. Co-operation with Teflon Brothers is a new way to be present in media interesting young men", said Hanna Korhonen, Cloetta's chief of marketing, about the video. The co-operation with Mynthon, intended to last a long time, is concentrated on social media, various kinds of content and summertime festivals. The co-operation started with the Lähiöunelmii single, whose music video was shot in Los Angeles. The design and implementation of the campaign was done by Cloetta as well as Universal Music, ToinenPHD and Bob the Robot.

== See also ==
- Throat lozenge
