= Merijal =

Confectionery factory in Oulu, Finland

Merijal Ab
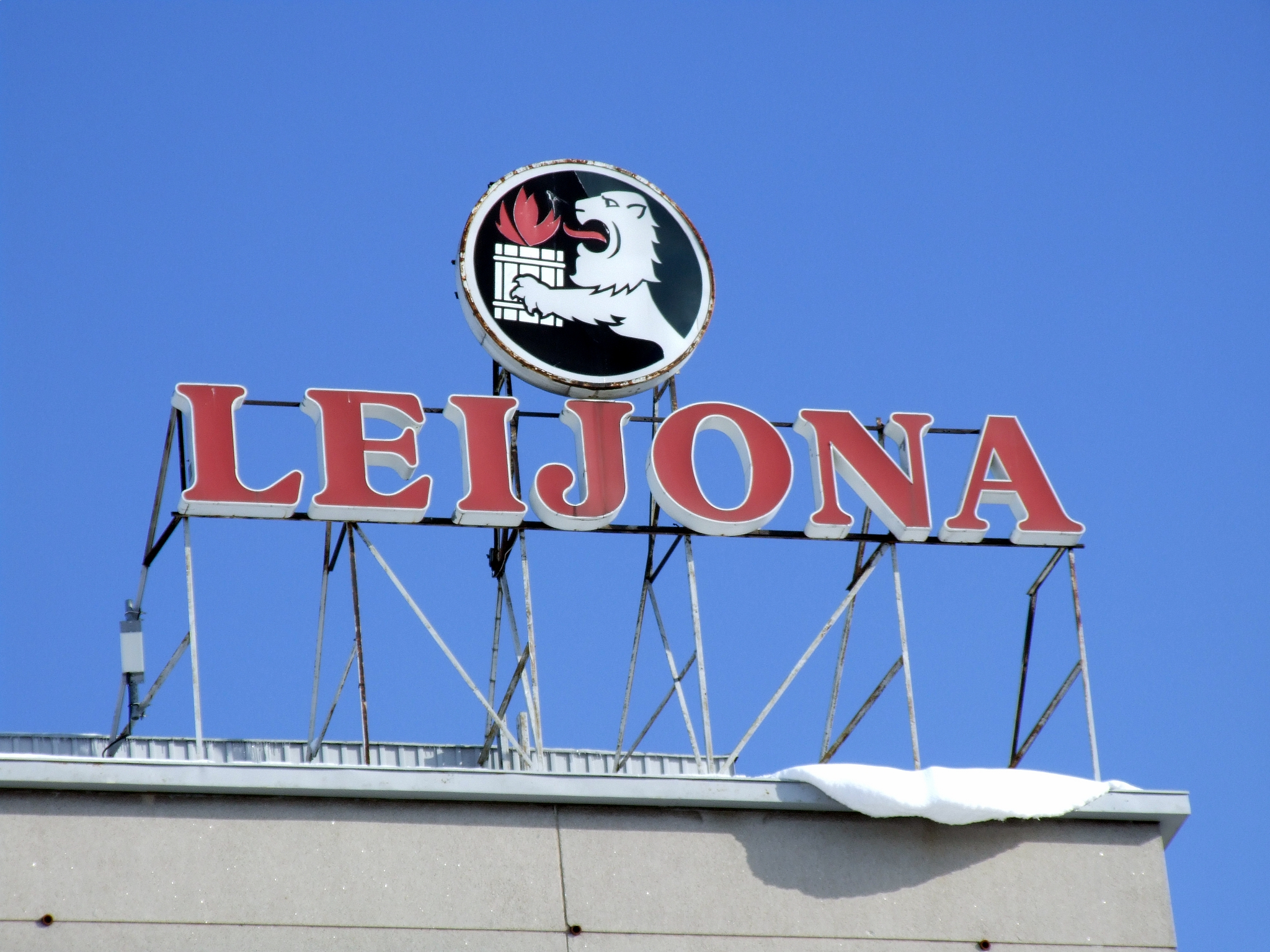
- The Terva Leijona advertisement in Tuira. There used to be a text saying "Merijal" under the text saying "Leijona".
- Company type: Factory
- Industry: Candy
- Founded: 1915
- Founder: Y. W. Jalander
- Defunct: 1996
- Headquarters: Oulu, Finland

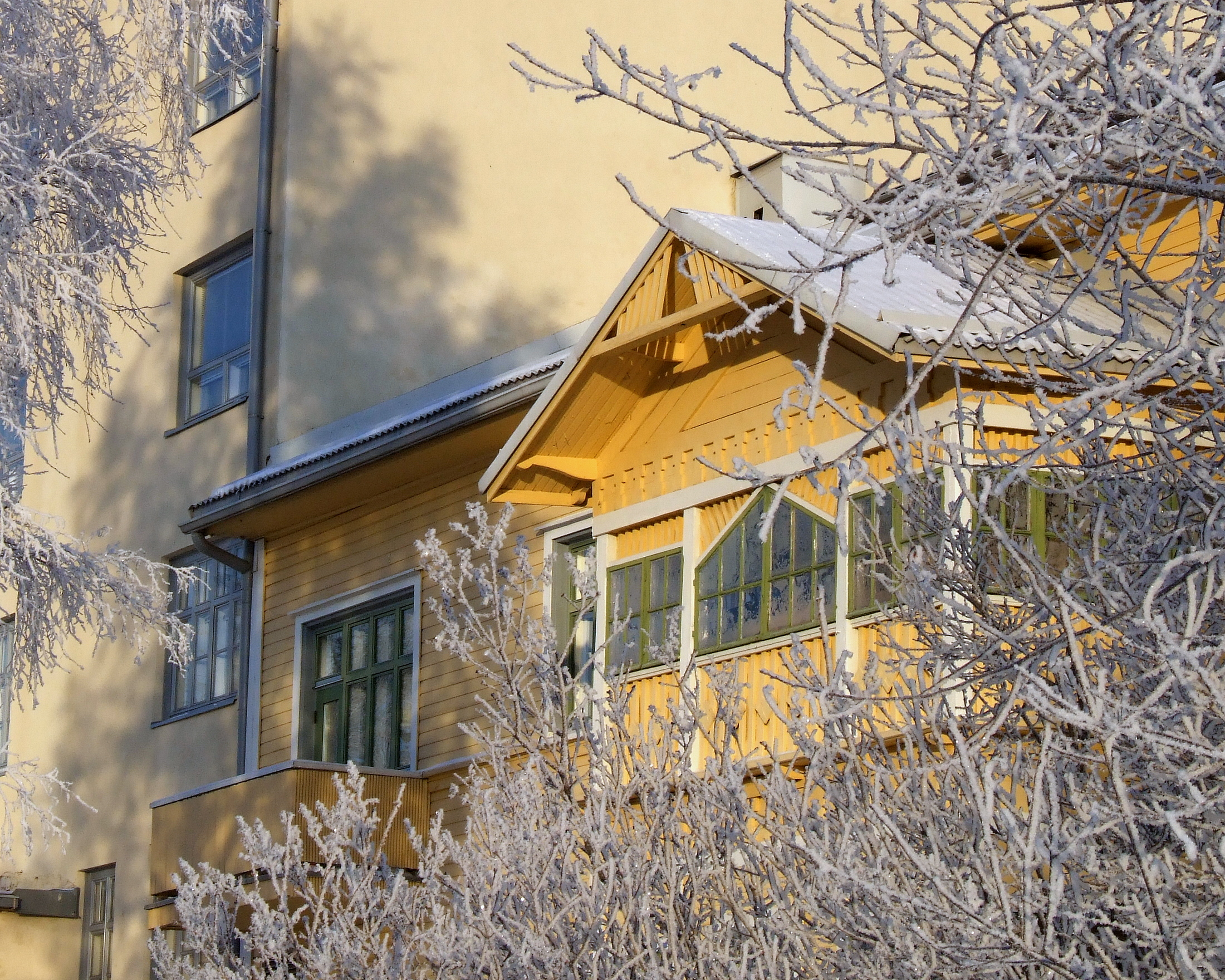
Merijal's old factory buildings in winter 2007.

Oy Merijal Ab was a Finnish candy factory based in Oulu.

== History ==
The factory was founded by pharmacist Y. W. Jalander in 1915. The original name of the company was Oy Merikosken Teknokemiallinen Tehdas Ab, but it was changed to Merijal already the next year. The factory worked for almost its whole existence on Koskitie street in western Tuira on the shore of the river Oulujoki.

The factory originally made products for the after-war shortage years, but various candies were included in its products already at an early phase. The first known candy pastille was the liquorice pastille MerMar. In the middle 1920s Sulo liquorice cough drops were invented. In its earlier times, the factory also hosted a coffee roastery.

In the 1930s there were quite a lot of products, a total of 188, of which over a hundred were candies. Jalander developed a tar-flavoured candy based on his research at the University of Leipzig. The Leijona ("Lion") pastille entered the market in 1934. It was named after Jalander's Leijona pharmacies in Helsinki and Oulu. There were about a hundred employees at the time.

Rolf Klärich and Eero Hahtonen bought Merijal in 1960. The Rettig Group tobacco factory (P. C. Rettig & Co) bought Merijal and the Turku-based Oy Seres Ab in the 1970s when they wanted to expand their business to the candy industry. Merijal was fused to Retting in 1972. At the same time, Merijal brought one of its hit products, the filled candy pastille Pastirol, onto the market. In the 1970s, the number of employees reached its peak, almost three hundred.

In the 1990s the candy industry started centralising and internationalising its operations. Rettig sold Merijal to Leaf International in 1992. Leaf closed the Merijal factory down in 1996. Nowadays Leaf is known as Cloetta Suomi Oy and it produces some of Merijal's successful pastille products, such as Mynthon.

After Merijal closed down, the factory buildings were used by electronics industry subcontractors. The YIT group bought the buildings, and an architecture contest of the design of the area was held, which was won by the architecture bureau A-Studio with their design "Kolmoset" ("The Triplets"). The old factory was almost completely dismantled in spring 2008, and YIT constructed a new residential area called Merijalinranta at the site. The first apartments were completed in October 2009.

== Leijona illuminated advertisement ==
One of the last things remaining of Merijal in Oulu is an illuminated advertisement for Leijona pastilles on top of an apartment building on Merikoskenkatu in Tuira. The original "Merijal" text was removed from the advertisement in the 1990s. The advertisement was temporarily removed for repairs in September 2008. The advertisement was put back in place on May Day 2009. The repairs were paid for by Lions Club Oulu Terwa and performed by Oulun Neon Oy.

== Famous products ==
- Terva Leijona pastilles
- Sulo pastilles
- Pastirol filled candies
- Mer-Mer drops
- Mynthon pastilles
- Tutti Frutti pastilles
