= Ahlgrens =

Swedish confectionery company

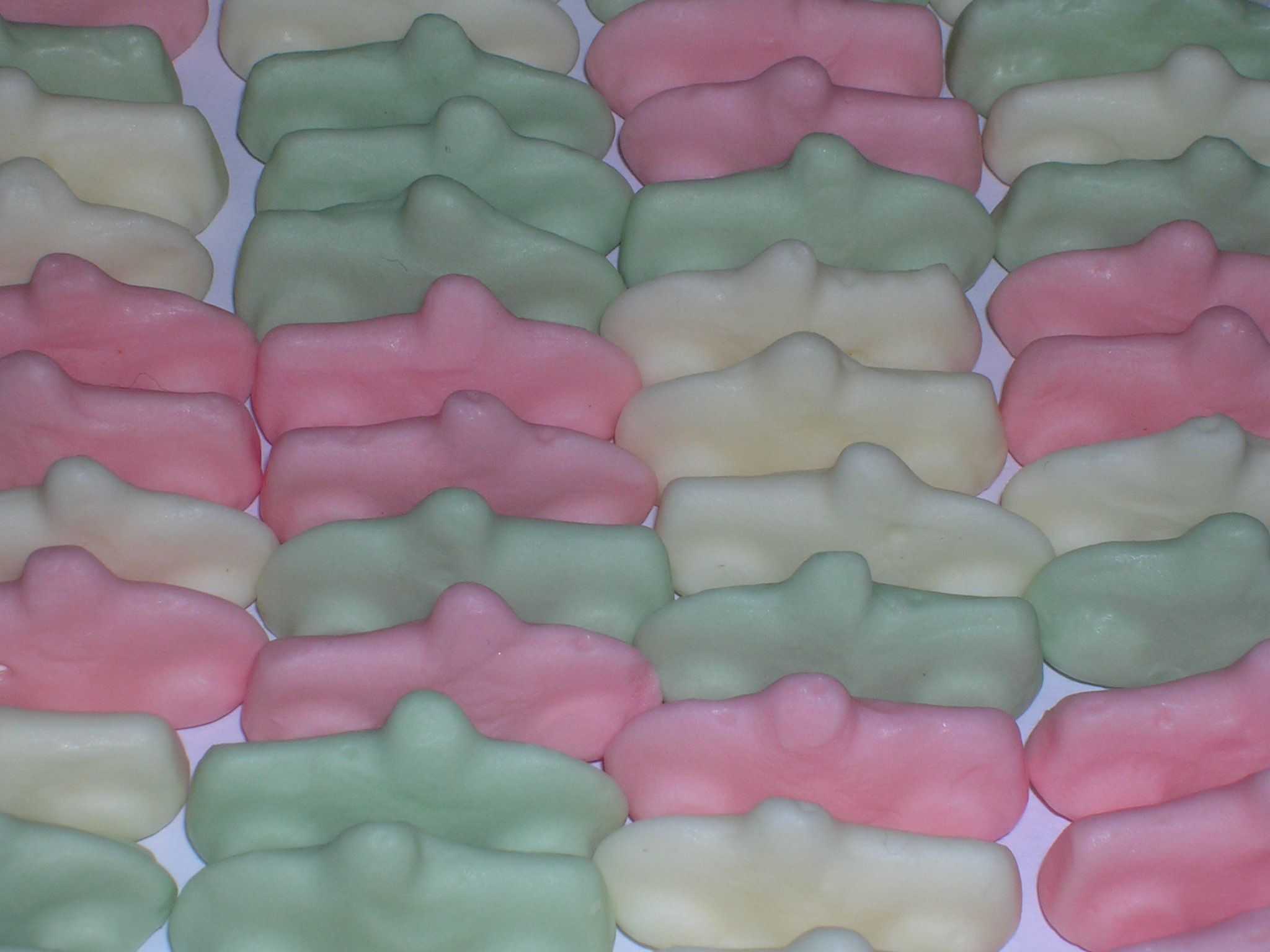
Ahlgrens bilar candies

Ahlgrens was a Swedish confectionery company. It was founded by Fredrik Ahlgren in the town of Gävle in 1885 as a store that sold paint and wallpaper, later expanding to the production and sale of various types of chemicals, perfumes and other products. In 1908, Ahlgrens introduced Läkerol, a mouthwash. A pastille of the same name was introduced the next year, and is still sold internationally in several variants.

In 1993, the company was bought by Huhtamäki, and all its products were rebranded to Leaf, with the exception of Ahlgrens bilar.

First introduced in 1953, Ahlgrens bilar ("Ahlgren's Cars") are a marshmallow confection, and the brand's best-known product. The product's tagline is "the world's most sold car", which may technically be correct by number of cars. The popularity of Ahlgrens bilar in Sweden has led to stores catering to Swedish tourists and residents in other countries selling them as well.

The brand has been extended to other car and road-related products, liquorice car tyres, travel trailers and sour road signs, the latter including elk warning signs, which are popular among German tourists.
