= Laekrits =

Confectionery brand

Laekrits, not to be confused with lakrits (Swedish for liquorice), were milk chocolate oblate spheroid-shaped candies with hard licorice candy shells. Laekrits were produced by Cloetta USA Inc., a subsidiary of Cloetta.

They were originally introduced to the US market in 1998. The name was filed for trademark protection in 1995, the trademark was registered in 1997, and re-registration after 6 years did not take place, so the trademark protection lapsed in 2004, as the procedures for maintaining the rights did not take place.
