= Grether =

Grether is a surname of Swiss German or South German origin. Notable people with the surname include:

- Esther Grether (c. 1936–2025), Swiss art collector and businesswoman
- Nicole Grether (born 1974), German badminton player
- Simon Grether (born 1992), Swiss footballer

== See also ==
- Grether's Pastilles, a Swiss brand of confectionery
