= Malaco =

Swedish brand of confectionery products owned by Cloetta

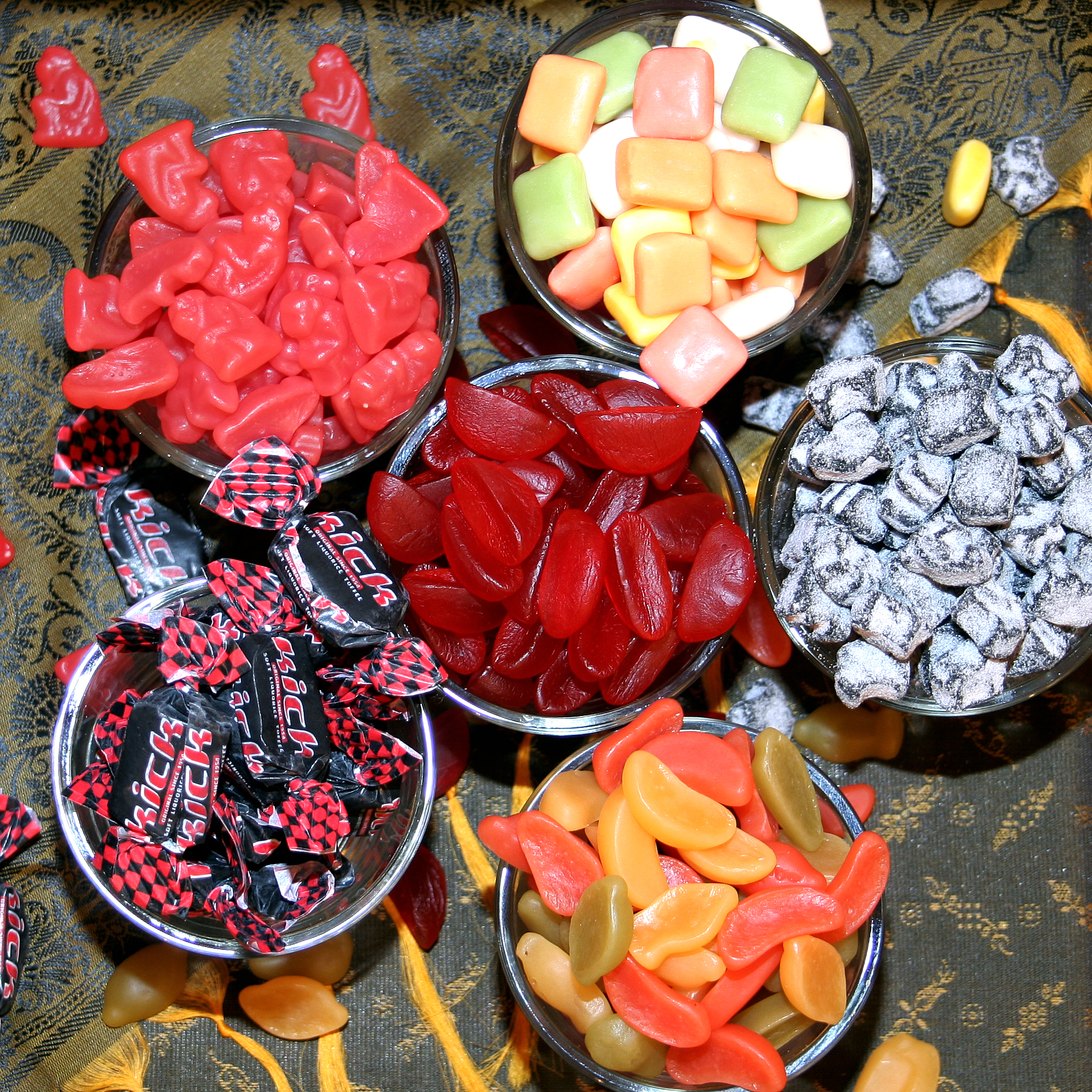
- Assorted Malaco candy
- Product type: Confectionery
- Current owner: Cloetta
- Produced by: Cloetta
- Country: Sweden
- Introduced: 1934
- Related brands: Swedish Fish, Gott & Blandat
- Markets: Sweden, Norway, Denmark, Finland, United States, Israel, Netherlands
- Previous owners: A/S Lagerman junior, Marabou Group, Kraft General Foods, CSM, Leaf

Malaco is a Swedish brand of confectionery products owned by Cloetta. Their products are sold in Sweden, Norway, Denmark, Finland, the US, Israel and the Netherlands among others. Products include Brio, Fruxo, Pim Pim, Swedish Fish, Djungelvrål, Gott & Blandat, and Malaco Crazy Face.

== History ==
Malaco was established in 1934 under the name Malmö Lakrits Compani by the Danish company Lagerman. The name Malaco comes from the initial letters of Malmö Lakrits Compani. The business was originally located at Lundavägen 17 in Malmö, but in 1948 it was moved to a newly built factory on Norbergsgatan in the Sofielund industrial area. Another factory was added in 1968 in Slagelse, Denmark (closed in 2011). The Malmö factory was shut down in April 2001, and since then no production has taken place in Malmö, only storage. Sales were initially limited to the Nordic countries, but from the 1950s there was also extensive export to the United States. In 1988, the company was acquired by the Marabou Group, which from 1990 became part of Freia Marabou A/S, itself purchased by Kraft General Foods in 1993. Malaco was sold again in 1997 to the Dutch food group CSM. After CSM acquired the Finnish confectionery business Leaf (originally part of, among others, Ahlgrens), the two companies merged to form MalacoLeaf AB. After a change of ownership in March 2005, MalacoLeaf was renamed Leaf. Leaf was in turn acquired by Cloetta in 2011.
