= Y. W. Jalander =

Finnish pharmacist

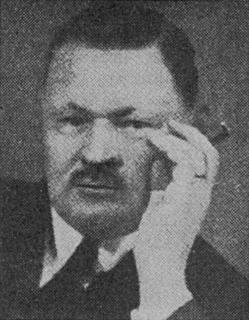

Yrjö Wilhelm Jalander (19 May 1874 Helsinki - 6 July 1955 Helsinki) was a Finnish pharmacist and the founder of Oy Merijal Ab and the pharmaceutical factory Leon.

Jalander's parents were Fredrik Wilhelm Jalander and Thecla Alexandra Forsell (1850–1910). His older brother was Major General, Governor and Minister Bruno Jalander.

Jalander graduated as a pharmacist from the University of Helsinki in 1900, and completed a degree in chemistry in Leipzig in 1904. From 1904 to 1908, Jalander ran the Åström Technochemical Plant in Turku, which he had founded together with the manufacturer Edvard Åström. Jalander operated a pharmacy in Ruukki from 1900 to 1903, in Karstula from 1908 to 1910 and in Mariehamn from 1911 to 1915. He then had a pharmacy in Oulu from 1914 and in Helsinki from 1918. Jalander bought Korkeavuorenkatu and Ratakatu corner plot in Helsinki on which he built a red-brick residential house completed in 1920, known as the house of Jalander. In this house, Jalander opened the Lion Pharmacy in 1921, which operated in the same location until 2007. Jalander also founded Oy Merijal Ab's technochemical plant in Oulu in 1915 and the pharmaceutical plant in Leon in Helsinki in 1922.

In the 1930s, Jalander was involved in Publishing Company Vasara, which published National Socialist and antisemitic literature. He was also the editor-in-chief of the Nazi Siniristi magazine, published by Vasara and contributed to Finland-Swedish Nazi newspaper För Frihet och Rätt.

In 1934, Jalander developed a tar-flavored cough lozenge Terva Leijona, which he named after the Leijona pharmacies he owned in Helsinki and Oulu. These pastilles became popular and are sold to this day.

== Works ==
- Apotekskarta öfver Finland. Helsingfors 1896, 1902, 1910
- Handköpssynonymika för apotek. Helsingfors 1896
- Handköpssynonymika för apotek jämte bihang, upptagande allmännare farmaceutiska synonymer, samlade och sammanställda av Y. W. Jalander. Helsingfors 1902
- Farmaceut-matrikel : biografiska uppgifter över de nuvarande och vordne farmaceuter vilka icke inneha' eller innehaft apotek i Finland. Uleåborg 1903, Helsingfors 1912
- Apteekkilupakysymys yhteiskunnan kannalta : ovatko yksityiset, epäoikeutetut harrastukset tyydytettävät yleisten kustannuksella? Karstula 1908
- Käsikauppanimistö apteekkeja varten / Handköpssynonymika för apotek. 1923
- Farmaseuttisia synonymeja / Farmaceutiska synonymer. Helsinki 1925, 3. painos (Lennart Skoglundin kanssa) 1932
- Suomen apteekit ja apteekkarit 1689–1938 / Finlands apotek och apotekare 1689-1938, tekijät Lennart Skoglund ja Y. W. Jalander. Helsinki 1938
- Den evige juden : en orientering i den aktuella judefrågan. Vasara, Helsingfors 1939
- Farmaseuttisia ja kemiallisia synonymeja / Farmaseutiska och kemiska synonymer, koonnut Y. W. Jalander. Tekijä 1948
- Farmaseuttisia ja kemiallisia synonymejä lisäyksiä I. 1949
- Apteekkilaitoksen tulevan kehityksen suuntaviivoja / Apoteksväsendets framtida gestaltning. Helsinki 1950
- 60 vuotta farmaseuttisella alalla / 60 år på den farmaceutiska banan . Tekijä 1951
- Ovatko lääkkeiden hinnat Suomessa liian kalliit? / Äro läkemedlens pris i Finland alltför höga?. Helsinki 1952
- Yliopiston apteekki / Universitetsapoteket. Helsinki 1952 (erikoispainos Hufvudstadsbladetin artikkelista 15.8.1952)
- Verotus kansanvaltaisessa maassa / Skatteväsendet i ett folkstyrt land. Helsinki 1953
- Hur förverkligas ett sant folkstyre? : socialism och folkstyre. Helsingfors 1954
- Synonymica pharmacetutica et chemica / Farmaseuttisia ja kemiallisia synonymeja, tekijät Y. W. Jalander, Jaakko Mäki. Suomen farmaseuttiliitto, Helsinki 1961
