= Huhtamaki PPL =

Indian multinational company

Huhtamaki PPL Limited or HPPL (formerly: The Paper Products Limited) is an Indian multinational company specializing in flexible packaging and packaging solutions, founded in 1935 in Lahore. In 1999, the company became part of Huhtamäki Oyj, Finland. It has been involved in the field of packaging for over 80 years.

The company has its registered office in Mumbai, India; and as of 2016, has 14 manufacturing locations across India and sales offices in Mumbai, Delhi, Bangalore and Kolkata.

The company manufactures flexible laminates, films, specialized pouches, cartons, tube laminates, labels, shrink sleeves, rotogravure cylinders, packaging machinery etc. It caters to customers across sectors ranging from food and beverages, personal care to pharmaceuticals, industrial products etc.

== History ==
The company was founded in 1935 as ‘The Paper Products Limited’ by Mr. Sardarilal Talwar. The company's first assignment was converting paper into paper products for the British Army Dairy, thus starting flexible packaging.

In the 1960s, the company moved from manufacturing packaging products using paper to using cellophane-based products for bread and biscuit packs, along with twist wraps.

In the 1980s, it started polymer-based packaging and created material for commercial use in the form of flexible packaging.

== Huhtamaki-PPL Timeline ==
- 1935 - Established in Lahore as The Paper Products Ltd (PPL)
- 1950 - PPL goes public and is listed on the Bombay Stock Exchange.
- 1960 - Flexible laminate Plant – I commissioned at Thane
- 1996 - Flexible laminate Plant – II commissioned at Silvassa
- 1998 - Flexible laminates & carton manufacturing Plant – III with takeover & extensive refurbishing of A&R Packaging at Hyderabad
- 1999 - PPL becomes a member of Huhtamaki Packaging Worldwide
- 2006 - Flexible laminate Plant – IV commissioned at Rudrapur
- 2007 - High-end pouching solutions commence at Silvassa
- 2010 - New Thane plant
- 2012 - Acquisition of majority stake in Webtech, niche player in premium labels
- 2014 - Capability and capacity expansion at Silvassa plant
- 2014 - The Paper Products Ltd is renamed as Huhtamaki PPL Limited (HPPL)
- 2015 - Positive Packaging Industries Limited becomes part of HPPL
- Huhtamaki PPL sold its Thane Majiwada Based Plant land to Phoenix Mall for 429 Crores.

== Products ==
The company offers solutions such as Flexible Packaging, Specialised Pouches, Thermoforms, Shrink Sleeve Solutions, Decorative Packaging, Value added cartons and Security Solutions and Promotions.

== Awards ==
HPPL has received several awards (as The Paper Products Ltd); recent ones being:

- Kelkar Memorial Award 1994 for Technical Research.
- Worldstar 2013 for Pure Magic Canister
- Worldstar 2014 for Horlicks Shrink Sleeves

== Parent company ==
Huhtamaki, headquartered in Espoo, Finland is a global packaging manufacturer and supplier for various applications. Its primary outputs include cartons and containers for foods and other consumer goods, disposable tableware and films and laminates for uses such as adhesives, plasters and labels.

It has 71 manufacturing units in 34 countries and a support staff of 15,800 globally. Its net sales in 2015 were approximately €2.7 billion.
