= Pastille =

Type of candy meant for light chewing

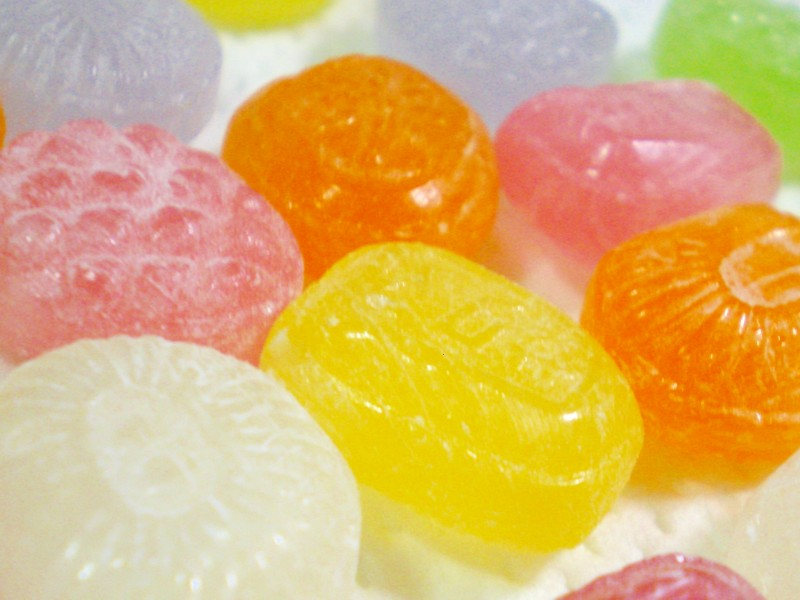
- Sakuma drops
- Alternative names: Troche, medicated lozenge
- Type: Confectionery
- Main ingredients: Thick liquid

A pastille or pastile is a type of sweet or medicinal pill made of a thick liquid that has been solidified and is meant to be consumed by light chewing and by allowing it to dissolve in the mouth. The term "pastille" may also define certain forms of incense.

One kind of pastille is a troche, a medicated lozenge that dissolves like a sweet.

== Origins ==
The word pastille comes from the same origin as pastry, from the Latin word pastillus, for a lump of meal or grain, which was from panis, "bread".

A pastille was originally a pill-shaped lump of compressed herbs, which was burnt to release its medicinal properties. Literary references to the burning of medicinal pastilles include the short story "The Birth-Mark" by Nathaniel Hawthorne, the poem "The Laboratory" by Robert Browning, and the novel Jane Eyre by Charlotte Brontë. They are also mentioned in the novel McTeague by Frank Norris, when the title character's wife burns them to mask an unpleasant odor in the couple's rooms. In Dashiell Hammett's The Maltese Falcon, "a half-filled package of violet pastilles" is among the items found in Joel Cairo's pockets. In Alexandre Dumas's The Count of Monte Cristo, pastilles are used for the delivery of both medicine and poison. They were also widely used during the eighteenth century in Western cultures to take herbal curatives and medicines, which eventually were developed into sweets.

== Production ==
Pastilles are made by pouring a thick liquid into a powdered, sugared, or waxed mold and then allowing the liquid to set and dry. The substances contained in the dried liquid are slowly released when chewed and allowed to dissolve in the mouth. The substances are then absorbed by the mucous membranes of the oral cavity or in the lower gastro-intestinal tracts. Various substances, be they of medicinal nature or for flavour, can be put into pastille forms.

Due to the oily nature of these active substances (essential oils, tinctures and extracts), pastilles are usually based on mixtures of starch and gum arabic, which emulsifies the substance and binds them in a hydrocolloidal matrix. The starch and gum also reduces the rate in which the pastille dissolves and moderates the amount of active substances delivered at a time. Gum arabic also hardens the pastilles and makes them more sturdy in storage and transport.

== Types ==
Well known pastille type candies include:

- Fisherman's Friend medicinal sweets
- Läkerol
- Violets
- Mason Dots
- Mentos
- Mint (candy)
- Pine Bros. throat drops
- Vocalzone Throat Pastilles, natural throat pastilles for voice overuse
- Jujube
- Rowntree's Fruit Pastilles, small round sweets
- Sisu (candy)
- Terva Leijona
- Vichy Pastilles, octagonal candy pastilles
- Wine gum
- Grether's Pastilles
- Pastiglie Leone, Herbal digestives and candy pastilles

== See also ==
- Gum drops
- Throat lozenge
