= Tupla (chocolate bar) =

Finnish chocolate bar brand

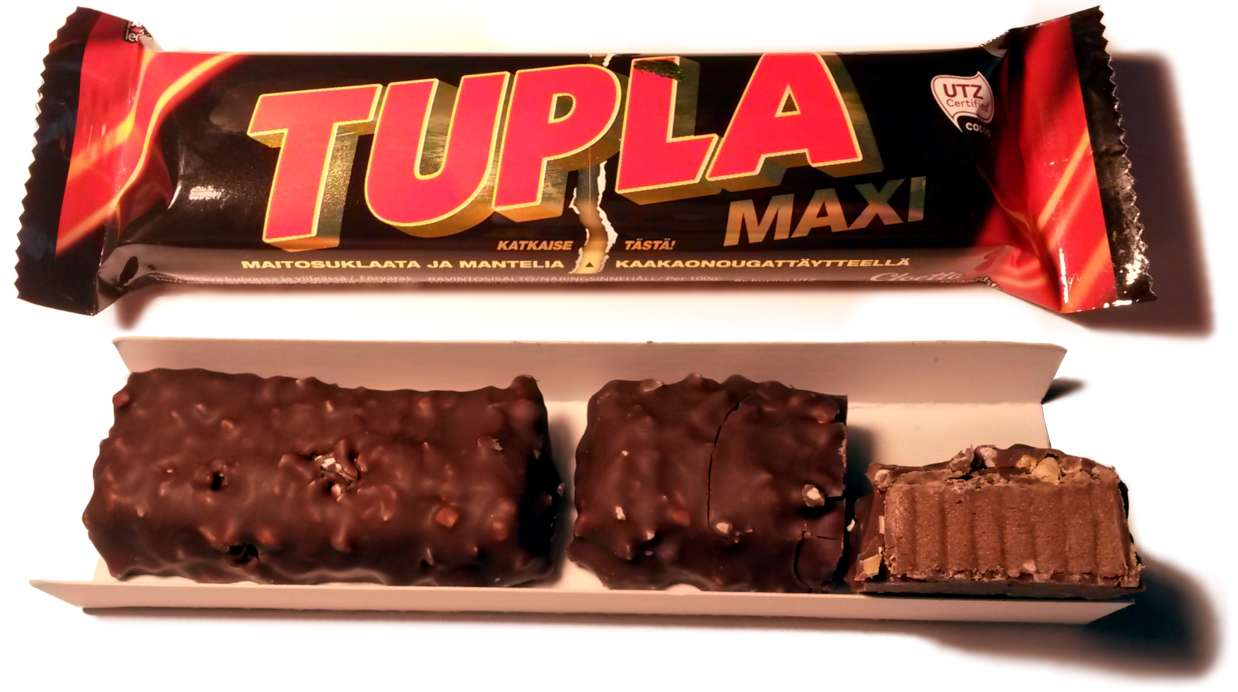
- Product type: Chocolate bar
- Current owner: Cloetta
- Country: Finland
- Introduced: 1960
- Markets: Finland, Sweden, Estonia, Latvia
- Website: www.tupla.fi

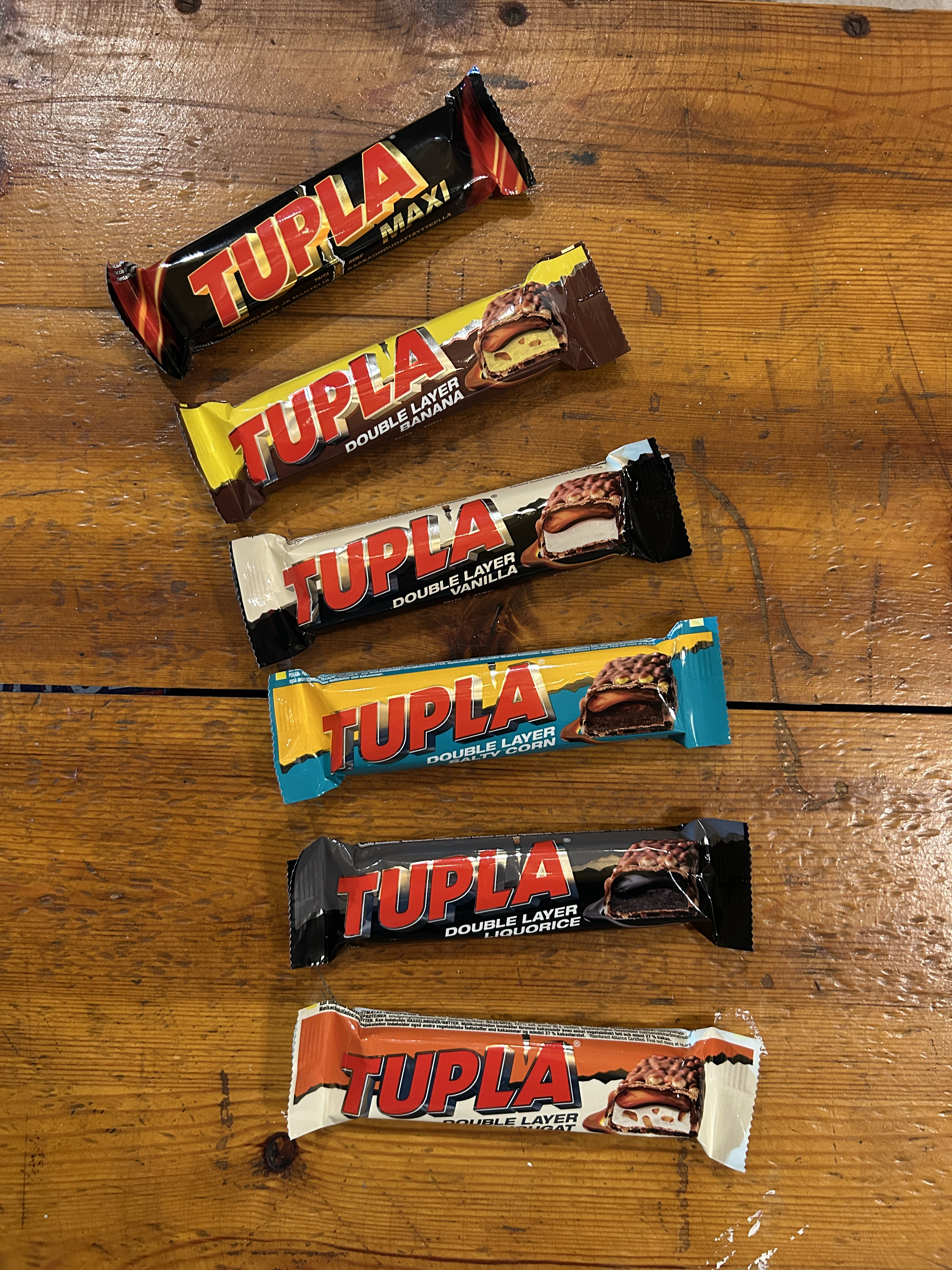
Six Tupla chocolate bars of different flavors are lined up vertically, showing colorful wrappers and their double-layer fillings.

Tupla is a Finnish chocolate bar made by Cloetta. It consists of milk chocolate with a nougat-flavoured filling, coated with bits of almond.

The name "Tupla", meaning "double", comes from the fact that there are always two Tupla bars in a single wrapper. The bars are placed end-to-end.

The original Tupla dates back to the 1960 and is still one of the most popular chocolate bars in Finland. In the 1990s and 2000s two variants have been introduced: Tupla White, with a coating of white chocolate instead of milk chocolate, and Tupla Black, with bits of liquorice added into the filling.

There were even Tupla Easter eggs available in the 1990s. Despite the name, however, there weren't two chocolate eggs nested inside each other.

== Ingredients ==
Glucose syrup, sugar, vegetable fats (palm, shea), skimmed milk powder, cocoa butter, almonds, whole milk powder, cocoa mass, fat reduced cocoa powder, whey powder (milk), hydrolyzed milk protein, salt, flavourings, emulsifier (sunflower lecithin).

== Nutrition information ==
Per 100g: 1954 kJ /463 kcal (Energy), 19g (Fat) of which 10g (Saturates), 64g (Carbonhydrate) of which 57g (Sugars), 6,3g (Protein), 0,47g (Salt).

== Weight ==
Bar weights are 50g TUPLA MAXI and 85g TUPLA KING SIZE.

== Tupla Sport ==
In 2008 a new side-brand was issued, Tupla Sport. Tupla Sport has a high fiber content and comes in two flavours: apple and raspberry. Its main ingredients are chocolate, muesli, almonds and nougat.

== Advertising ==
=== Easy to open at any time ===
In 2019, Tupla ran ads which featured a variety of shots where the packaging was being opened using hands showing the new "Easy to open" feature. The ad was companied by a slogan - "Easy to open at any time". The ads ran in Estonia and Latvia.

== See also ==
- List of almond dishes
