= Swedish Fish =

Fish-shaped chewy candy

- A pack of Swedish Fish
- Product type: Confectionery
- Country: Sweden
- Introduced: 1957; 69 years ago

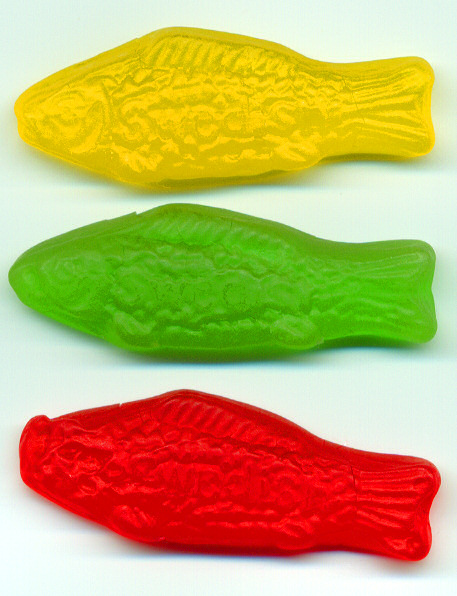
Three Swedish Fish: yellow, green, and red. Each has "Swedish" embossed on its side.

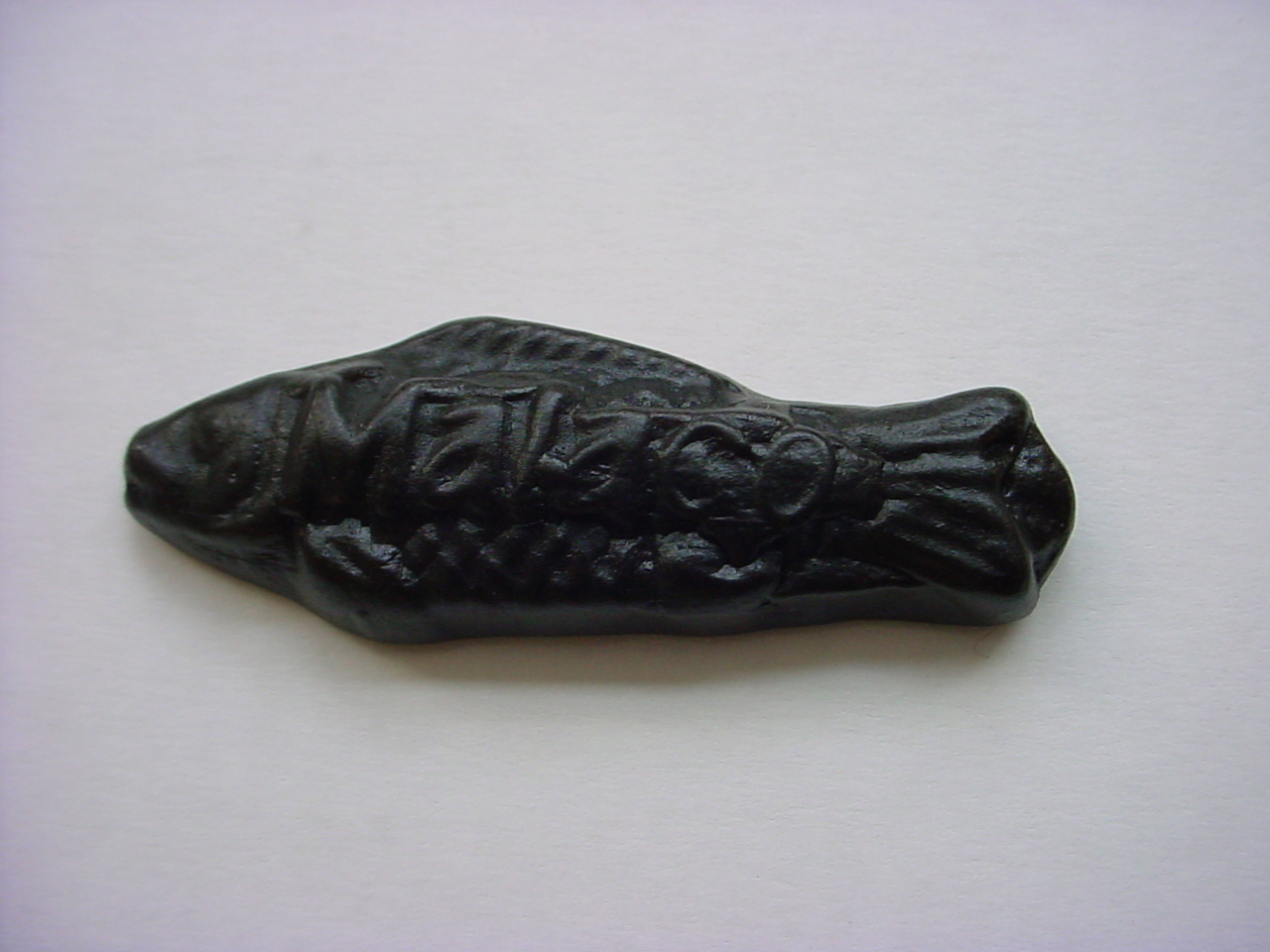
Salmiak-flavored black Swedish Fish or "salted herring", with the manufacturer's name "Malaco" embossed.

Swedish Fish is a fish-shaped, chewy candy originally developed by Swedish candy producer Malaco in 1957 for the U.S. market. They come in a variety of colors and flavors.

== Ingredients ==
Swedish Fish contains:

- Sugar
- Invert sugar
- Corn syrup
- Modified corn starch
- Citric acid
- Natural and artificial flavors
- White mineral oil
- Carnauba wax (Manufactured in Canada) or Beeswax (Manufactured in Turkey)
- Red (Dye) #40
- Yellow (Dye) #6
- Yellow (Dye) #5
- Blue (Dye) #1

Previous wrappers advertised the product as being "a fat-free food". They are gluten-free.

=== Chemical properties ===
One of the ingredients in Swedish Fish is invert sugar, a combination of glucose and fructose. Invert sugar is important in Swedish Fish due to its ability to retain moisture.

Swedish Fish contain modified cornstarch which is used primarily to form its shape. It is utilized as a medium in trays when the product is put in them to be molded. In addition, white mineral oil is added to these trays to supplement the starch, prevent the candy from crumbling, and give it a shiny coating.

Carnauba wax is used in Swedish Fish as a coating and gives the candy a waxy texture.

Citric acid also adds to the product's shelf life.

== In Sweden ==
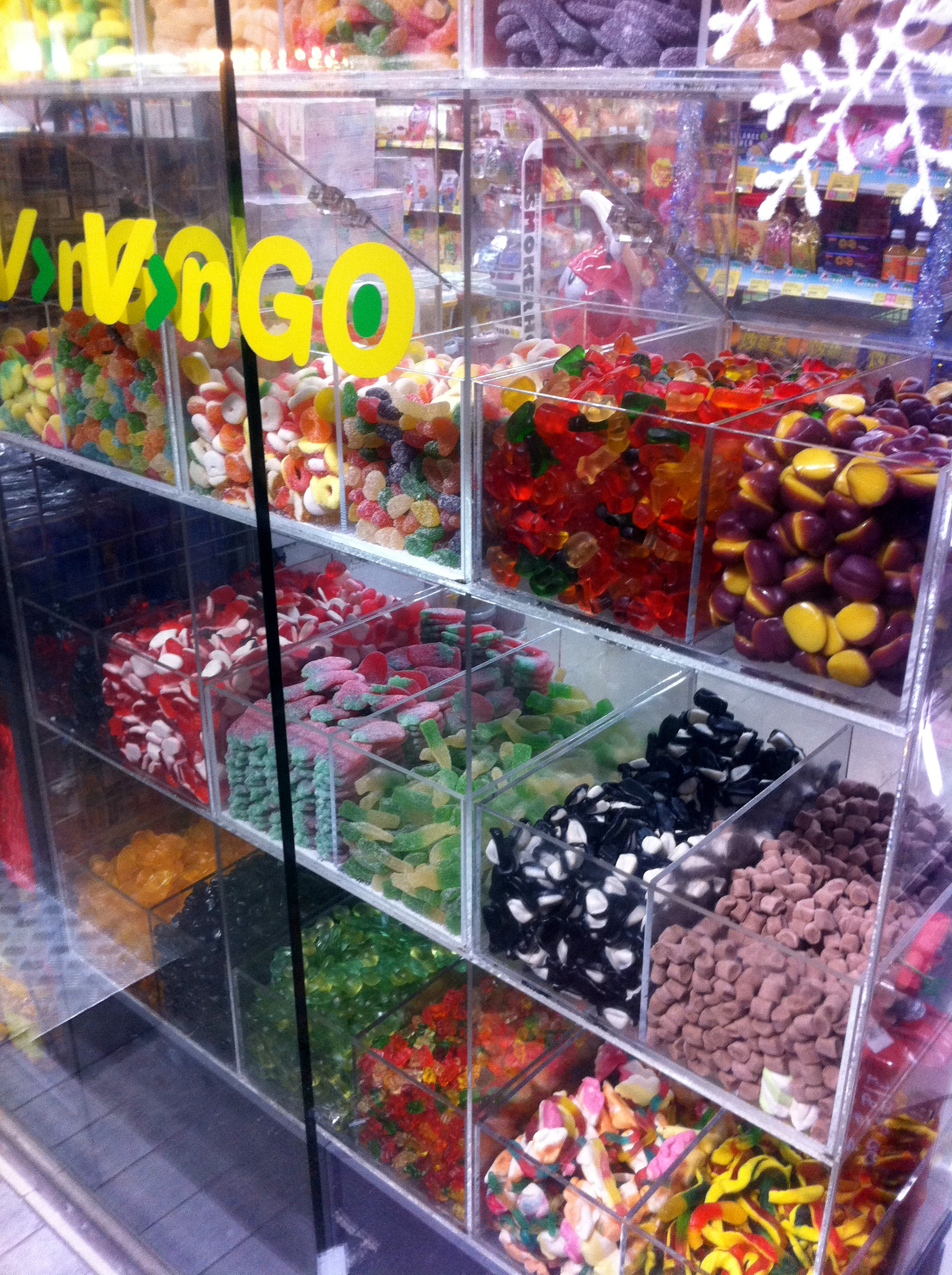
A shelf of pick and mix candies similar to those used in Sweden

In Sweden, a large share of confectionery is sold as pick and mix. Wine gums are sold in many different shapes, of which fish is just one. The Swedish Fish candy is marketed under the name "pastellfiskar", literally "pastel fish", and under the Malaco brand among others. The fish-shaped candies are also part of a Malaco bag of mixed candy called "Gott & Blandat", which translates to "tasty and mixed" in English. This popular candy bag was introduced in 1979 and over the years many variations of it have been made. The Swedish recipe differs from the American one as white mineral oil is banned in Europe due to associated health risks, and many US food dyes are not approved for EU consumption in the same quantities used in the US. It contains glucose syrup, sugar, starch, acid (citric acid), vegetable oils (coconut, rapeseed), flavorings, coating (beeswax) and dyes (E160e, E141, E160a). Malaco also exports "Original Swedish Fish".

== In North America ==
Today, the Swedish Fish consumed in North America are made in Hamilton, Ontario, Canada, and Turkey by Mondelēz International. In Canada, Swedish Fish are distributed under Mondelez International's Maynards Bassetts brand.

The fish are distributed in the U.S. by Mondelēz International. The fish-shaped candy gained enough popularity on its own to where the Malaco, and later Cadbury, company had to do little advertising for the product, until the mid 2010s. During the mid 2010s a resurgence in popularity resulted in greater accessibility in supermarkets and convenience stores where they are often sold prepackaged in plastic bags. Building upon this resurgence, the company created "Giant Fish" television advertisements and a "Treadin' Water" YouTube mini-series, which follows the miscellaneous adventures of four friends and a Giant Swedish Fish sharing an apartment. The first few episodes of the mini-series were published onto YouTube on May 9, 2016.

Originally colored red with a flavor unique to the candy, they are now also available in several different colors, such as Orange & Lemon-Lime. Purple Swedish Fish in grape flavor were discontinued in 2006. The fish come in two different sizes. Initially, the smaller fish came only in red; now fish of both sizes are available in all flavors. According to a visit to the factory on the Food Network's show Unwrapped, green is not lime, but pineapple flavor, while yellow is a lemon-lime flavor. In stores today people can purchase Swedish Fish Tails 2 Flavors, which doubles the flavor per fish. There are three different flavor combinations being blue raspberry strawberry, watermelon pineapple, and raspberry mango. This new version of the product also brings out a variety of new colors for the candy.

== History ==
Swedish Fish were launched on the U.S. market in 1957. The original owner of these candies was the Swedish company Malaco, which wanted to expand its sales to North America and entered partnership with Cadbury. Wanting to create a product that reflected the culture of Sweden in some way and to catch the eye and interest of an everyday American, a fish-shaped gummy candy was created. Fishing was and is still a large part of Sweden's culture, and fish is a considerable part of the Swedish diet. During the time of the creation of Swedish Fish, Sweden was mostly associated with fish so Malaco chose the shape. Mondelez distributes the candy in the U.S. today, but the fish gummies are still distributed by Malaco in Sweden.

=== Partnerships ===
In 2009, Rita's Italian Ice, a U.S. chain that serves Italian ice and frozen custard, introduced a red Swedish Fish flavored Italian ice as a cobranded product.

Trident, a gum company owned by Mondelez Global, produced a Swedish Fish flavored product, which is advertised as "Berry + Lemon" flavor.

In 2016, Nabisco created a test-market product Swedish Fish Oreos, available at Kroger grocery stores in the US.

As of 2023, Trader Joe's sells a similar candy under their private label, called "Scandinavian Swimmers".

In 2022, Ghost, an energy drink company, had a partnership with Swedish Fish. However, in 2025, they had ended partnership along with other brands that Ghost also partnered with.
