= Vocalzone Throat Pastilles =

Throat lozenge brand

Vocalzone
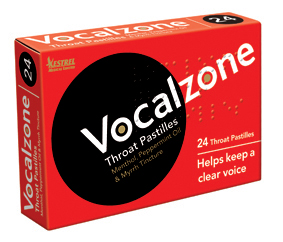
- Product type: Throat lozenge, throat pastille, medicated confectionery
- Current owner: Kestrel Medical Limited
- Country: UK
- Introduced: 1912
- Markets: Worldwide
- Tagline: Helps Keep a Clear Voice
- Website: vocalzone.com

Vocalzone Throat Pastilles is a brand of throat pastille, or throat lozenge, used to help keep a speaking or singing voice clear during public performance and singing. The company was founded in 1912 by William Lloyd, who adapted a medicine he had created for the tenor Enrico Caruso into a pastille form. After Lloyd’s death in 1948, Vocalzone was sold to Ernest Jackson in 1955 before later being acquired by Kestrel HealthCare Limited (now Kestrel Medical Limited) in 1993.

Vocalzone received international attention after being used by Theresa May during her keynote speech to the Conservative Party conference in October 2017 where she struggled with cold. Other notable users of the product include Tom Jones, Derek Jacobi, Hilary Duff, Jme, Frank Turner, James Hetfield, Cristina Scabbia, Nick Holmes, Jerry Only, the Swingles, Katherine Jenkins, Dionne Warwick, Wendi Peters, Stevie McCrorie, Kelly Jones, Jack Savoretti, Gaz Coombes, Simon Mayo and Thom Yorke.

In 2017 the company partnered with British music company The Famous Company, and have sponsored stages at several festivals in the United Kingdom.

The main ingredients used in Vocalzone are menthol, peppermint oil and myrrh tincture, with a small amount of licorice extract. Also present are sucrose, liquid glucose, modified starch (tapioca, maize), vegetable oil, carnauba wax, color E153 (vegetable carbon black, glucose syrup, sodium benzoate E211), and purified water.

Vocalzone is vegan, lactose-free and gluten-free. There are multiple flavors of Vocalzone pastilles, including sugar-free choices, and a Vocalzone tea.
