= Terva Leijona =

Finnish liquorice candy

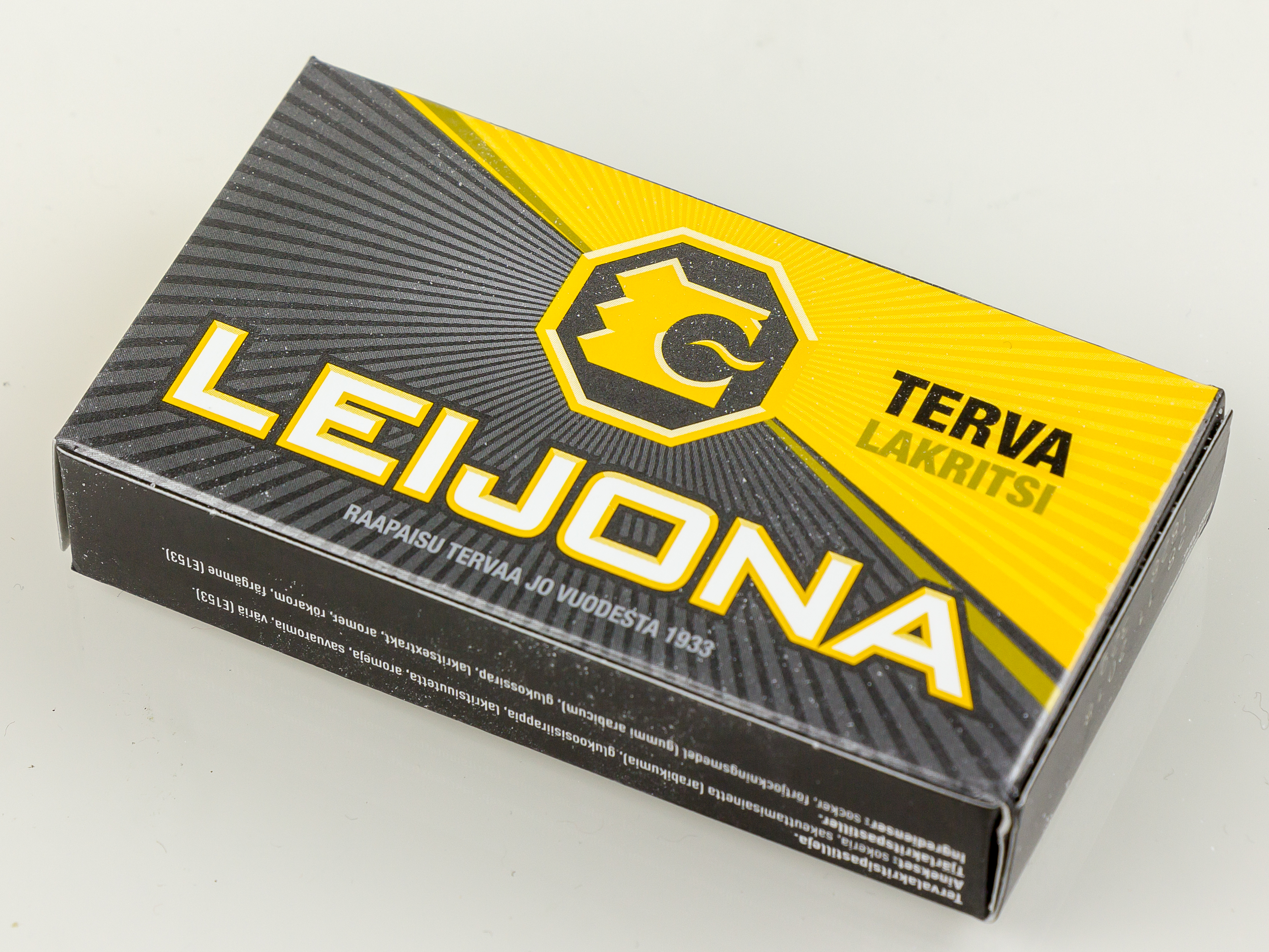
Terva Leijona packet

Terva Leijona ("Tar Lion") is a Finnish liquorice candy with tar flavouring. The candy was originally produced by Merijal and is today manufactured by Cloetta.

It is available in traditional flavours like sugarless, licorice, and salmiakki. Leaf has also released a Villi Pohjola (Wild North) mix that contains more exotic flavours, such as juniper berry - lemon, cloudberry - licorice and lingonberry - havu (pine/spruce needles). The candy was invented by Y. W. Jalander.

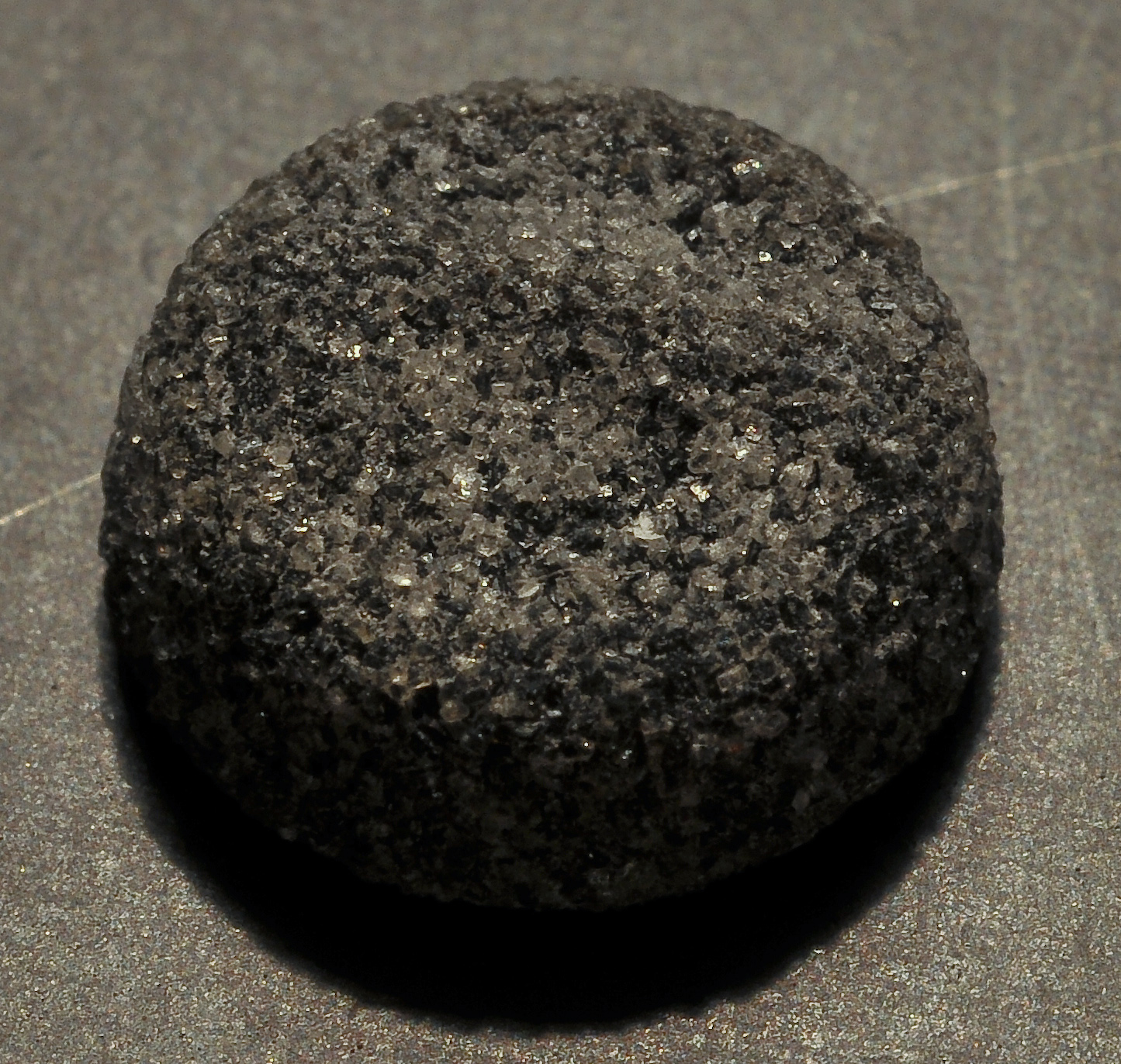
Terva Leijona piece

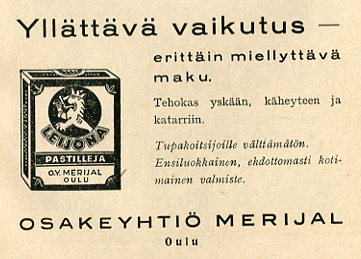
Leijona Pastille advertisement from 1930s

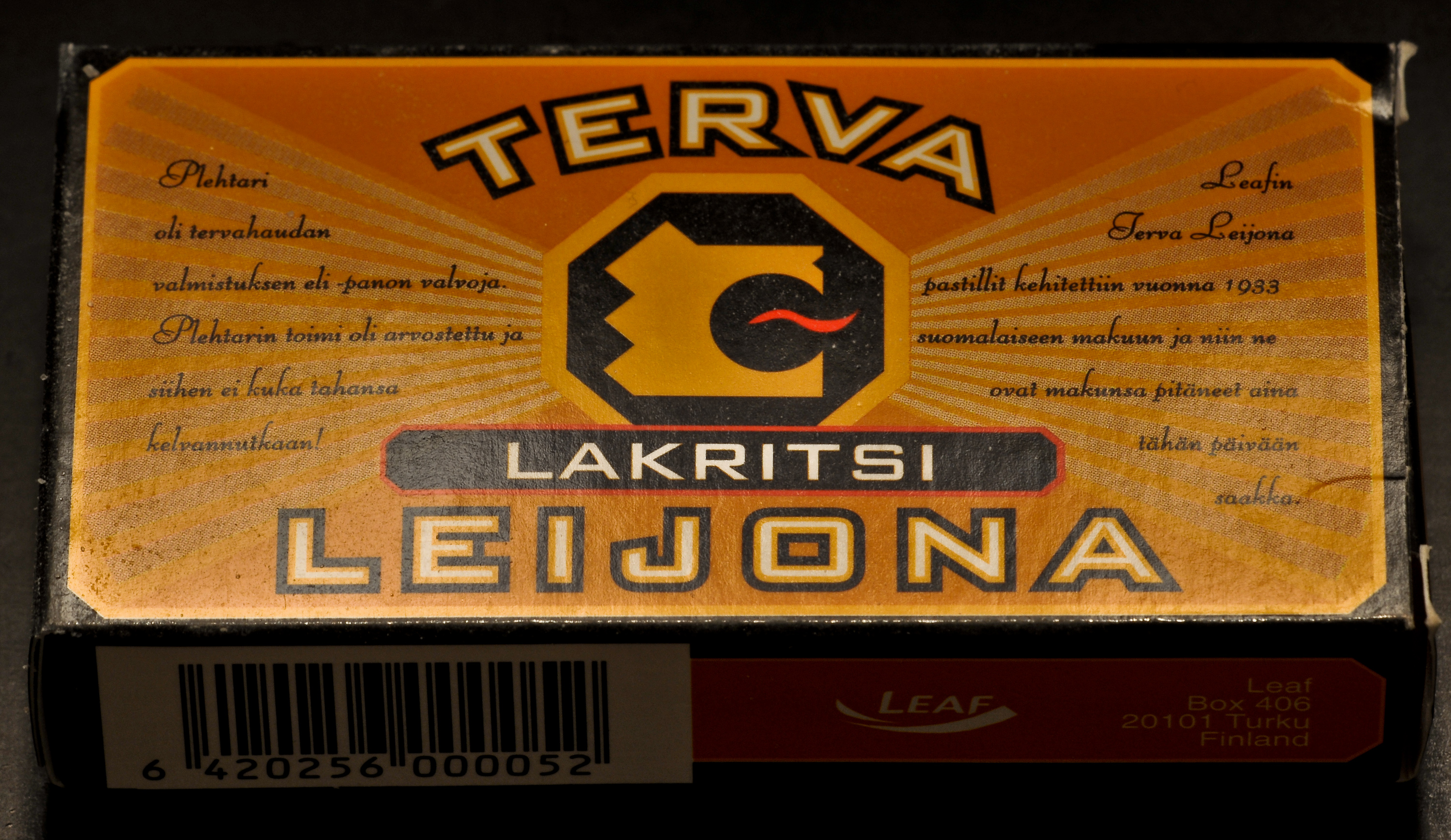
An old Terva Leijona packet
