= Jenkki =

Finnish chewing gum brand

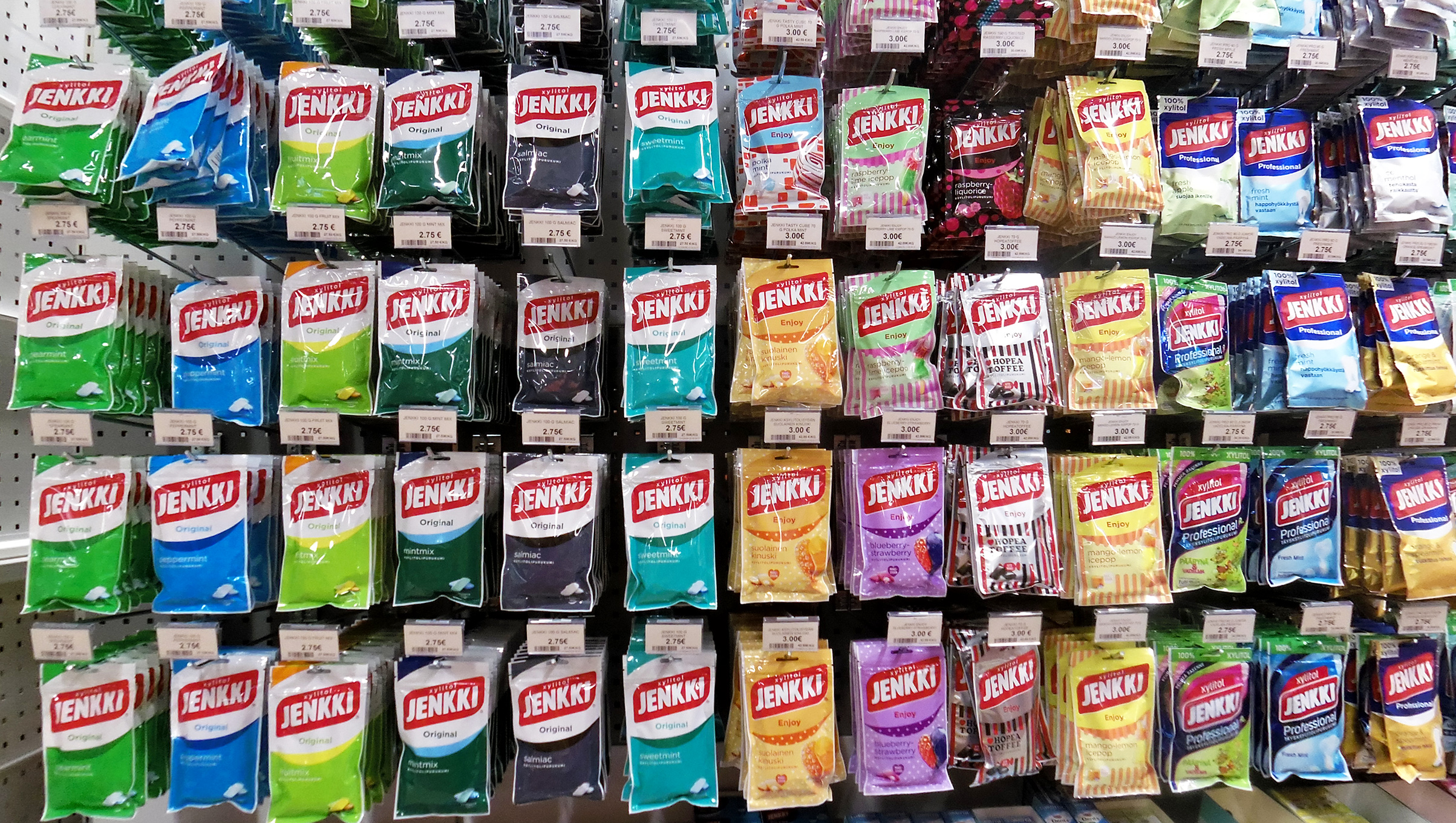
Jenkki xylitol chewing gum packages in Finland

Jenkki ("Yankee") is a Finnish chewing gum brand developed in 1951 by Huhtamäki. Nowadays Jenkki is in ownership of Cloetta.

In 1975 Jenkki introduced the first chewing gum in the world that included xylitol. Xylitol gum was invented in Turku, Finland. The xylitol was originally derived from birch trees. Nowadays Jenkki xylitol gum is available in numerous different flavours, including peppermint, spearmint, eucalyptus, lemon, tutti frutti, strawberry and salmiakki.

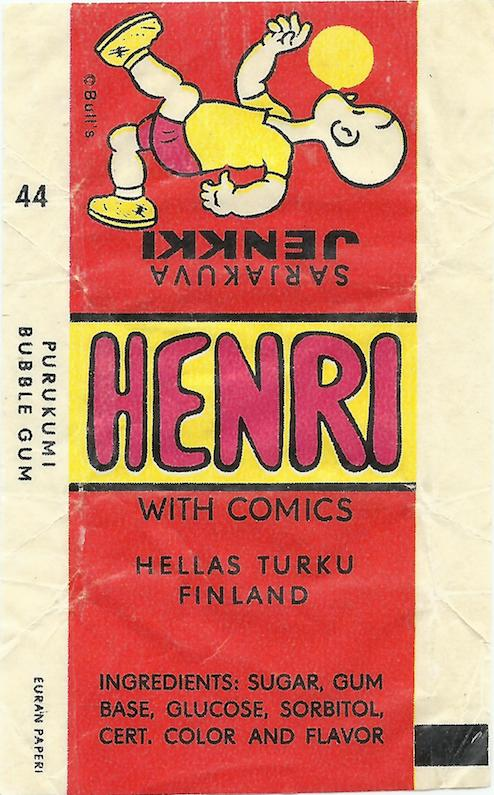
Henri bubble gum wrappers from 1969

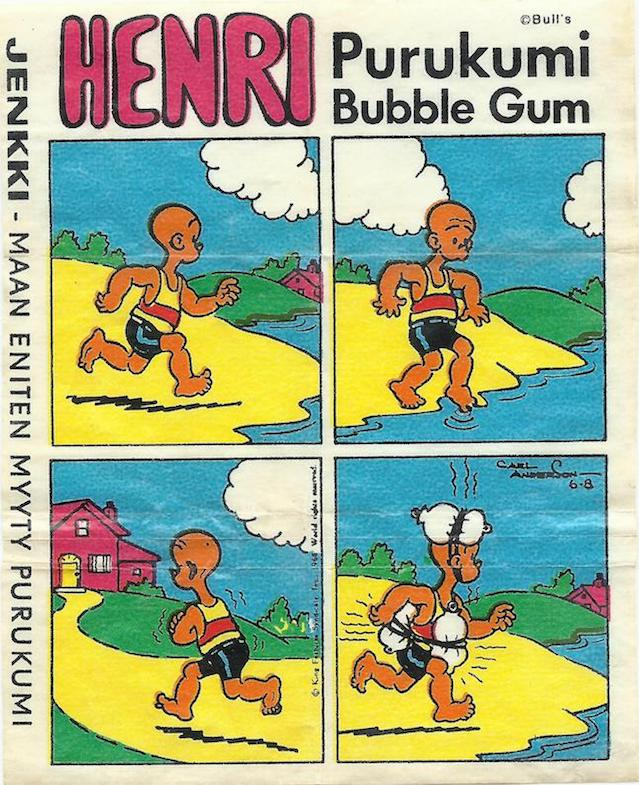
Henri bubble gum wrappers from 1969

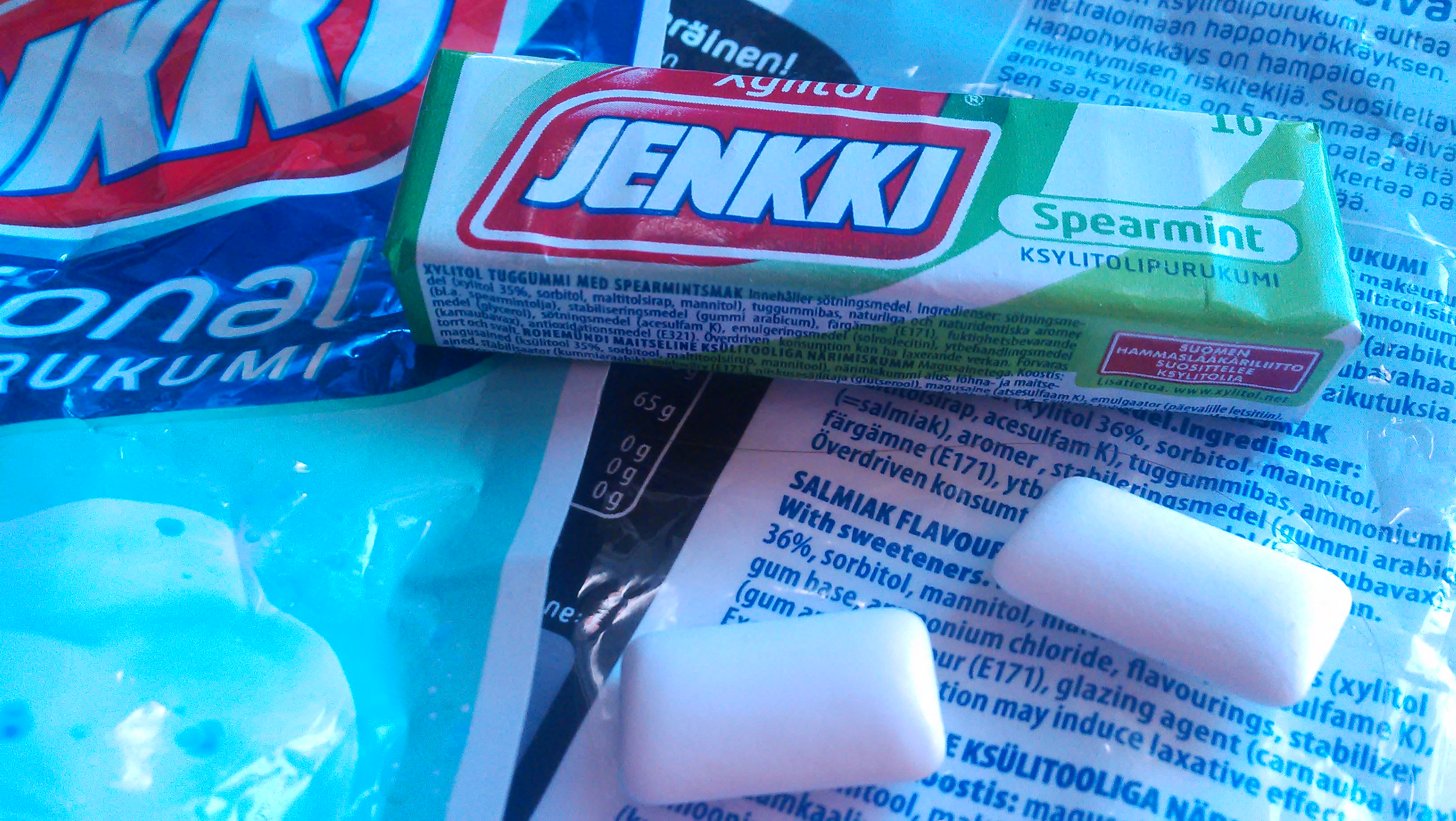
Xylitol jenkki smaller package

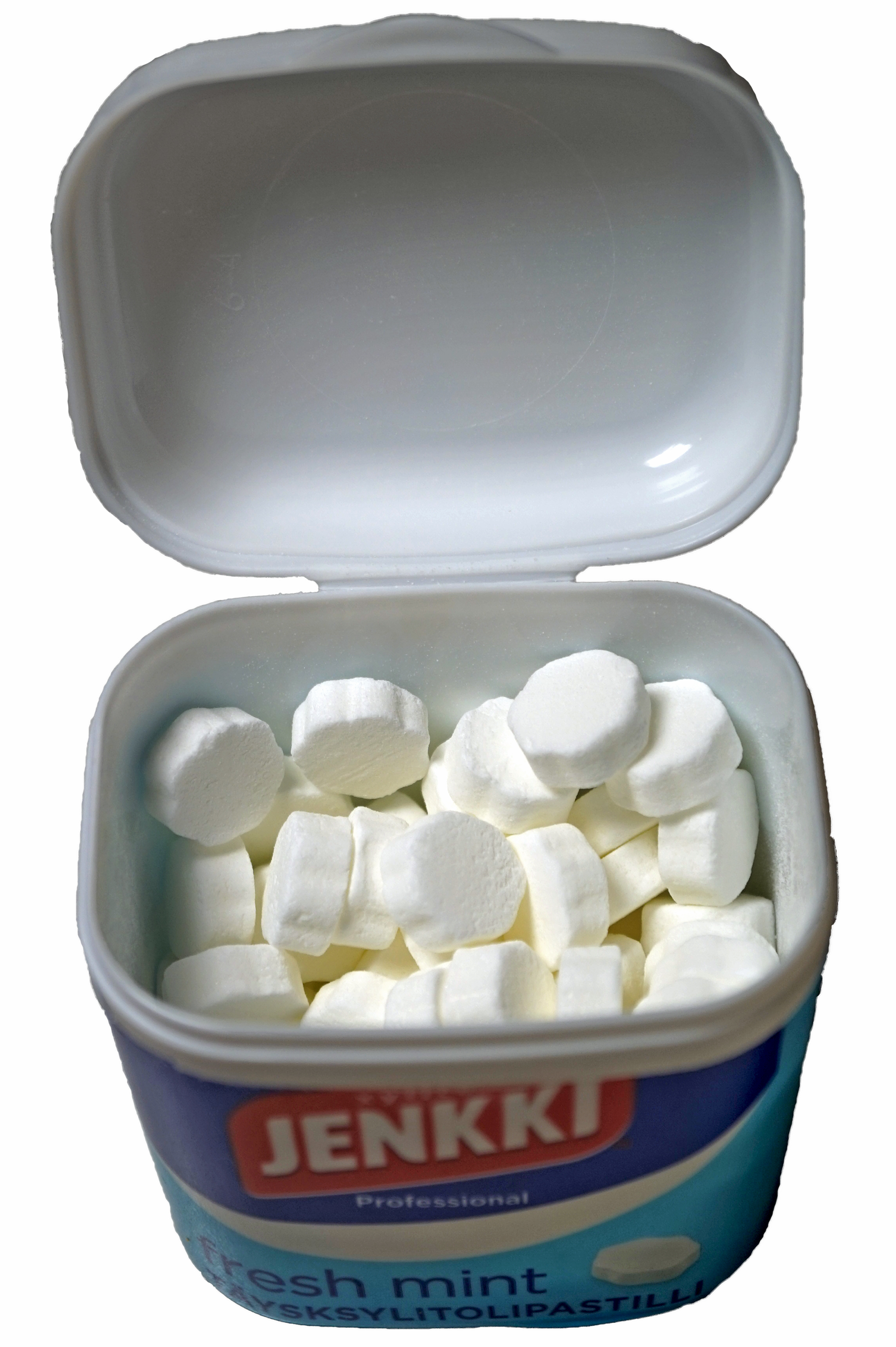
Jenkki Professional
