= Grether's Pastilles =

Brand of pastille candy

Grether's
- Company type: Brand of Doetsch Grether AG
- Industry: Health care, Consumer goods
- Founded: 1850 (as Allenbury's Pastilles)
- Headquarters: Altnau, Canton of Thurgau, Switzerland
- Parent: Doetsch Grether AG, Basel
- Website: grethers.ch

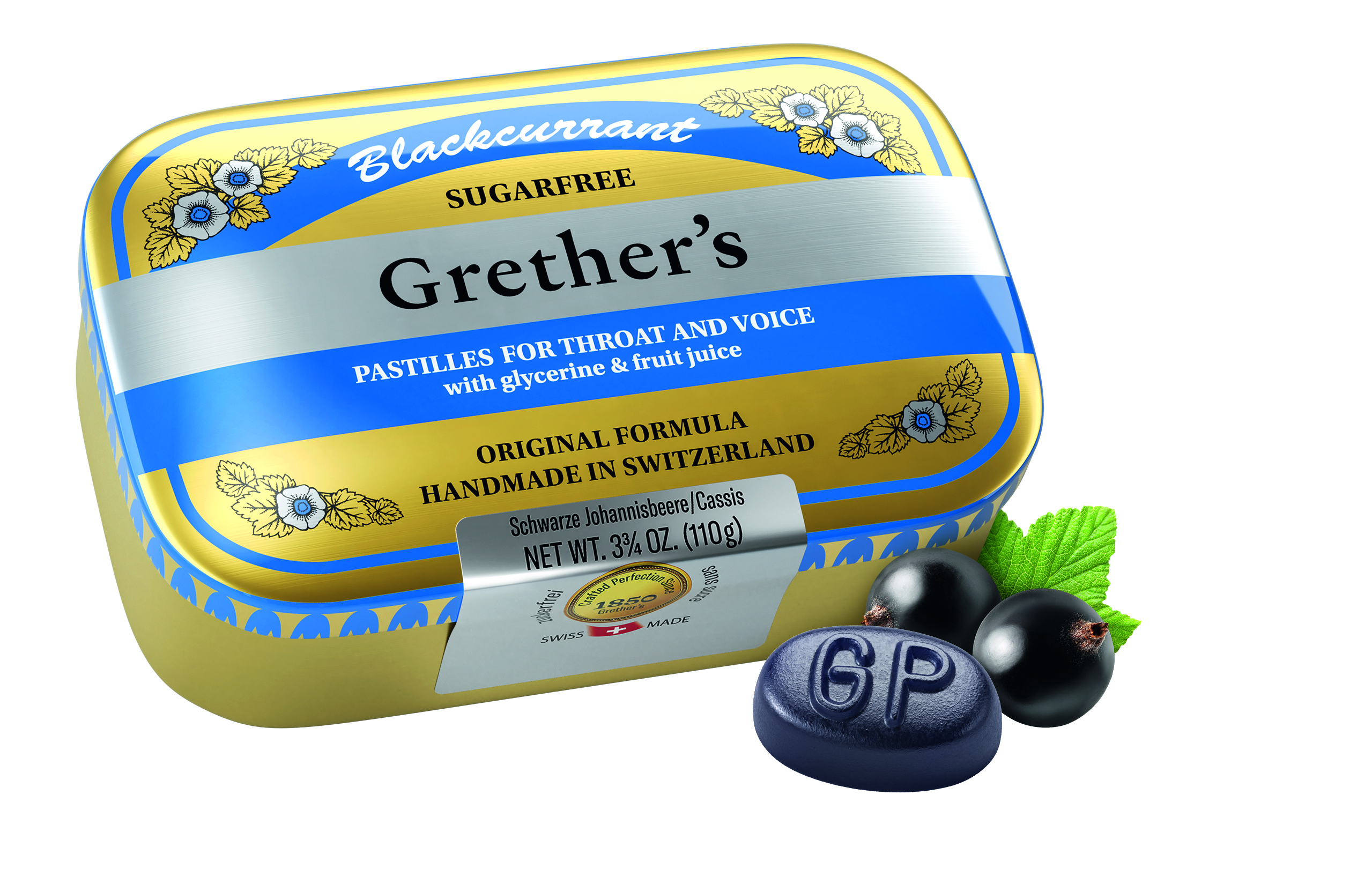
Grether's 110g Blackcurrant

Grether's (formerly Grether's Pastilles and before that Allenbury's Pastilles) is a Swiss brand of glycerin-based soft pastilles, manufactured since 1974 in Altnau on the shores of Lake Constance in the Canton of Thurgau. The brand is owned by Doetsch Grether AG, headquartered in Basel, Switzerland. The pastilles are used for the care of the throat and voice, and are particularly well known for their distinctive gold tin and their widespread popularity in the entertainment industry.

== History ==
=== Origins in England (1850) ===
The origins of Grether's date back to 1850, when the London family business Allen & Hanbury Ltd. first developed and manufactured pastilles based on blackcurrant juice. These were initially sold under the name Allenbury's Pastilles.

=== Introduction to Switzerland (from 1910) ===
From 1910 onwards, Allenbury's Pastilles made their way into Switzerland, where they grew steadily in popularity. Doetsch Grether AG – a company founded in Basel in 1899 by Richard Doetsch and Oscar Grether as a pharmacy – took over Swiss distribution and secured the full brand and distribution rights in 1930.

=== Acquisition and Renaming (1974) ===
In 1974, Doetsch Grether AG relocated production entirely to a manufactory in Altnau on the Swiss shore of Lake Constance and renamed the product Grether's Pastilles. Despite the new name and production site, the traditional manufacturing process based on the original 1850 recipe has remained unchanged to this day.

=== Rebranding to "Grether's" (2023) ===
In early 2023, the brand received a modernised visual identity and has since been marketed under the shortened name Grether's. The iconic gold tin, as the central brand element, was retained unchanged.

== Production ==
The production of Grether's is considered exceptionally labour-intensive and does not permit mass manufacturing. The recipe is based on a unique combination of plant-derived glycerin, natural fruit essences from sun-ripened berries and flowers, and the gelling agent agar-agar, which is extracted from red seaweed.

Because agar-agar does not permit industrial-scale production, individual manufacturing steps are still carried out by hand today. The fruit mass, freshly prepared each morning, is cooked and then left to rest so that air bubbles can escape. The pastilles subsequently mature in specially temperature-controlled climate chambers for a total of approximately three months before going on sale.

Approximately 85 million Grether's pastilles are consumed worldwide every year.

== Properties and Use ==
The pastilles contain plant-derived glycerin, which forms a protective film over the mucous membranes and vocal cords as the pastille dissolves in the mouth. This provides a moisturising and soothing effect in cases of:

- Sore throat and hoarseness
- A strained or muffled voice
- Dry mouth (xerostomia)

Grether's pastilles are not classified as a medicinal product and are available without prescription in pharmacies and drugstores. They stimulate natural saliva production and are considered a complementary measure for vocal care, without claiming therapeutic efficacy against infectious diseases.

== Products and Varieties ==
The current range includes the following varieties:

Variety
Blackcurrant (Classic)
Blackcurrant Sugar-Free
Redcurrant Sugar-Free
Elderflower Sugar-Free
Blueberry Sugar-Free
Ginger-Lemon

The sugar-free varieties contain maltitol as a sweetener, which may have a laxative effect when consumed in large quantities.

Since 2023, part of the range has also been available in smaller-format mini pouches (30 g) in retail, including exclusively at Coop in Switzerland.

== Packaging and the Gold Tin ==
The characteristic gold tin has remained essentially unchanged since the brand's beginnings in the late 19th century and is its most recognisable trademark. Consumers frequently repurpose the tins after the pastilles are finished, using them to store jewellery, coins, or other small items. In Switzerland, the tins have acquired cult status.

=== Limited Editions (from 2019) ===
Since 2019, limited special editions of the Blackcurrant Sugar-Free variety have been released annually in elaborately designed gold tins featuring typically Swiss motifs. Editions I through IV were designed by Basel-based illustrator Patrizia Stalder, whose work was included in the 2018/19 edition of the 200 Best Illustrators Worldwide publication by Lürzer's Archive. From the fifth edition onwards, the designs have been created by Biel-based illustrator and visual artist Capucine Matti.

The limited editions are typically pre-reserved by pharmacies, drugstores, and private collectors and regularly sell out quickly.

== Recognition in the Entertainment Industry ==
Grether's pastilles have enjoyed a strong reputation in the international entertainment industry for decades, particularly among singers and stage performers. Several prominent artists have publicly spoken about their use of the pastilles:

- Ariana Grande stated that she always keeps multiple tins of Grether's with her on tour.
- Katy Perry described the pastilles as an indispensable part of her stage routine and noted that several well-known performers, including Idina Menzel and Alice Ripley, rely on them.
- Hugh Jackman was publicly observed consuming Grether's pastilles regularly during his Broadway performances. He subsequently confirmed this on social media, explaining that the pastilles help him protect his voice during long shows – sometimes splitting a single pastille in two to make it last longer.
- Gwyneth Paltrow and the coaches of the US television show The Voice are among other public figures who have mentioned using Grether's.

== Distribution ==
Grether's pastilles are available in Switzerland, Austria, Germany, and other European countries through pharmacies and drugstores. In the United States, Grether's USA (grethersusa.com) distributes the products via e-commerce and selected brick-and-mortar retailers, including Sprouts Farmers Market locations from 2024 onwards.

== Doetsch Grether AG ==
Doetsch Grether AG is a medium-sized, family-owned Swiss company based in Basel, founded in 1899 by Richard Doetsch and Oscar Grether as a pharmacy. Today it is one of the leading companies in the Swiss consumer healthcare market, specialising in the marketing and distribution of established brands in the fields of pharma, OTC (over-the-counter), and consumer care.

Grether's is the company's most internationally recognised brand and its primary brand ambassador.

== See also ==
- Allen & Hanburys
- Doetsch Grether AG
- Hoarseness
- Xerostomia
