= Huhtamäki =

Finnish consumer packaging company

Huhtamäki Oyj
- Type: Julkinen osakeyhtiö
- Traded as: Nasdaq Helsinki: HUH1V
- Industry: Packaging
- Founded: 1920; 106 years ago
- Headquarters: Espoo, Uusimaa, Finland
- Key people: Pekka Vauramo (Chairman); Ralf K. Wunderlich (CEO); Thomas Geust (CFO)
- Products: Paper, plastic and moulded fibre packaging
- Revenue: ▼€4.0 billion (2025); €4.1 billion (2024)
- Operating income: ▼€321 million (2025); €372 million (2024)
- Net income: ▼€199 million (2025); €232 million (2024)
- Total assets: ▼€4.566 billion (2025); €4.894 billion (2024)
- Total equity: ▼€1.930 billion (2025); €2.124 billion (2024)
- Number of employees: 17,400 (average 2025)
- Website: www.huhtamaki.com

PE-coated disposable paper cup for Burger King. Huhtamaki now partners with Xampla for non-plastic coating

Huhtamäki Oyj (styled Huhtamaki) is a global food packaging company, headquartered in Espoo, Finland. Its products include paper and plastic disposable tableware, such as cups, plates and containers for quick service restaurants, coffee shops, retail stores, caterers and vending operators. The company provides coated paper cups for fast food chains such as Burger King, as well as flexible packaging and labels for food and drink, pet food, pharmaceuticals, household and hygiene brands. Huhtamaki also makes egg cartons and trays, fruit trays and cup carriers.

== History ==
Huhtamaki was initially established as a manufacturer of confectionery in 1920 in Finland and grew in size over the years, eventually becoming an industrial conglomerate with diverse product lines that included ladies' clothing, pharmaceuticals and electronic components. A packaging division was established in 1965 under the Polarpak brand. In 1988, the company decided to concentrate on a single business area. A number of business units were divested over the following decade, including the pharmaceutical division Leiras (sold to Schering) and the original candy business (which by this point included the Leaf brand). During the same period, several packaging companies were acquired.

Today Huhtamaki is solely focused on the packaging sector with around 16,000 employees in over 30 countries. Its North American operations are based within the Kansas City Metropolitan Area in De Soto, Kansas. The parent company Huhtamäki Oyj is listed on Nasdaq Helsinki Ltd.

== See also ==
- Huhtamaki PPL
