= Läkerol =

Swedish candy brand

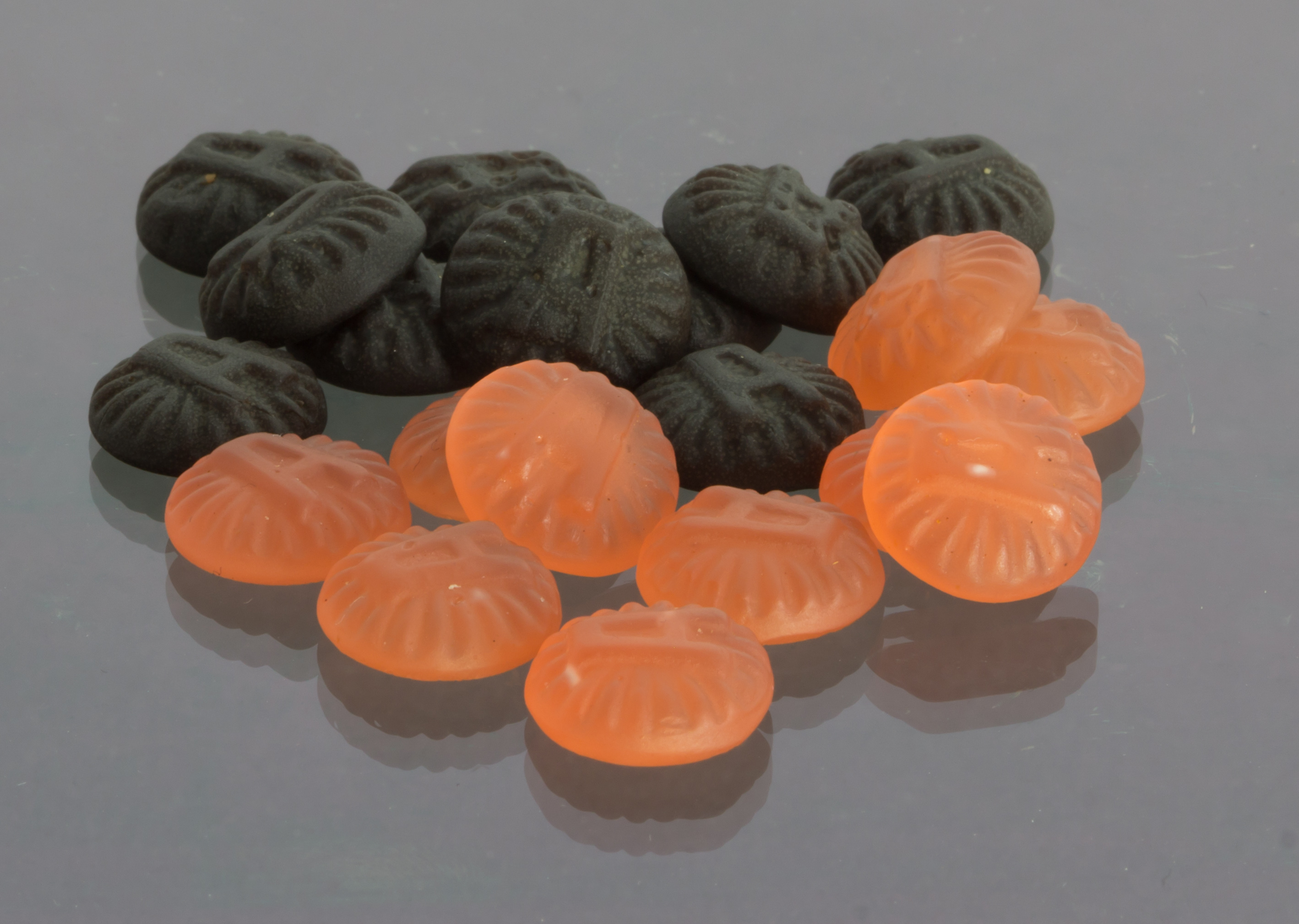
Läkerol Salmiak and Raspberry Lemongrass flavor

Läkerol is a Swedish brand of candies. The candies are sugar-free pastilles with the major ingredient being gum arabic. The candies are produced in a variety of flavors. The candy is produced by the Swedish confectionery company, Cloetta. Läkerol's primary markets are the Scandinavian areas of northern Europe and Finland, after that Switzerland, The Netherlands, Belgium, Singapore, and Hong Kong.

The Monitor ERP Arena in the Swedish city of Gävle was named Läkerol Arena from 2006 to 2014.

In 1909, Adolf Ahlgren (1872-1954) introduced Läkerol. To this day, most Läkerol candies are stamped with the imprint of the letter "A". The name "Läkerol" comes from the Swedish word läka, which means "heal". In the 1980s, Swedish tennis player Björn Borg did a series of advertisements for Läkerol.
