= Cloetta =

Swedish confectionery and nuts company

Cloetta AB
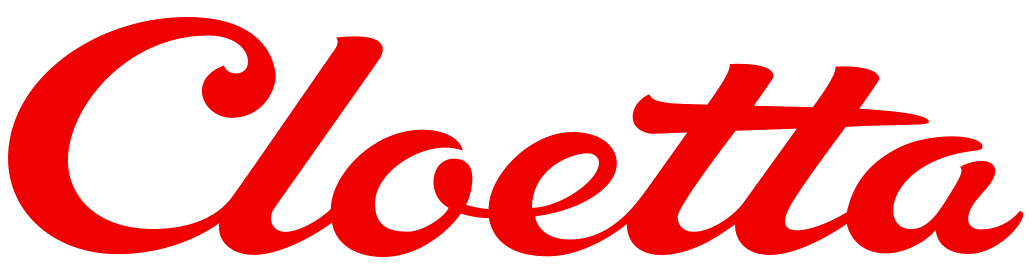
- Type: Public
- Traded as: Nasdaq Stockholm: CLA B
- Industry: Confectionery
- Founded: 1862; 164 years ago in Copenhagen, Denmark
- Founder: Bernard, Christopher and Nutin Cloëtta
- Headquarters: Sundbyberg, Stockholm County, Sweden
- Area served: Europe
- Key people: Katarina Tell (President and CEO), Morten Falkenberg (Chairman)
- Products: Confectionery, Nuts
- Revenue: SEK 8.6 billion (2024)
- Operating income: SEK 807 million (2024)
- Net income: SEK 477 million (2024)
- Total assets: SEK 11.1 billion (2024)
- Total equity: SEK 5.4 billion (2024)
- Number of employees: 2,600 (December 2024)
- Website: cloetta.com

Cloetta AB is a Swedish confectionery company. The company manufactures and sells local confectionery brands on its main markets Sweden, Finland, Norway, Denmark, Netherlands, Germany and the UK.

== History ==
In 1862, Christoph Cloëtta (1836–1897) and his two brothers Nutin Cloëtta and Bernard Cloëtta founded Danish chocolate manufacturer Brødrene Cloëttas steam chocolate factory. In 1873, Nutin Cloëtta established a Swedish subsidiary in Malmö, Sweden, and one subsidiary in 1896, in Oslo, Norway.

After several years of legal disputes between Cloetta Fazer's two major owners, the Svenfelt-Trotzig family company Malfors Promotor and the Finnish family-owned Karl Fazer, it was announced in June 2008 that Cloetta Fazer would be split up. Cloetta became an independent company again in late 2008 and was listed on the Stockholm Stock Exchange on 8 December 2008. In December 2011, it was announced that Cloetta and Leaf would merge into one company.

== Current ==
Cloetta has six factories in five countries. The two largest factories are in Levice, Slovakia, and Ljungsbro, Sweden. The company is listed on the Nasdaq Stockholm. In 2016, Cloetta finalized a deal to acquire pick & mix supplier Candyking, which operates in the United Kingdom and the Nordic countries. In 2017, Cloetta bought the bulk candy company Candyking.

Some of the brands owned by Cloetta are Läkerol, Cloetta, Candyking, Jenkki, Kexchoklad, Malaco, Polly, Sportlife and Red Band.

Henri de Sauvage-Nolting left his position as CEO in September 2024. He was replaced by Katarina Tell.
