= Salmiakki Koskenkorva =

Finnish liqueur

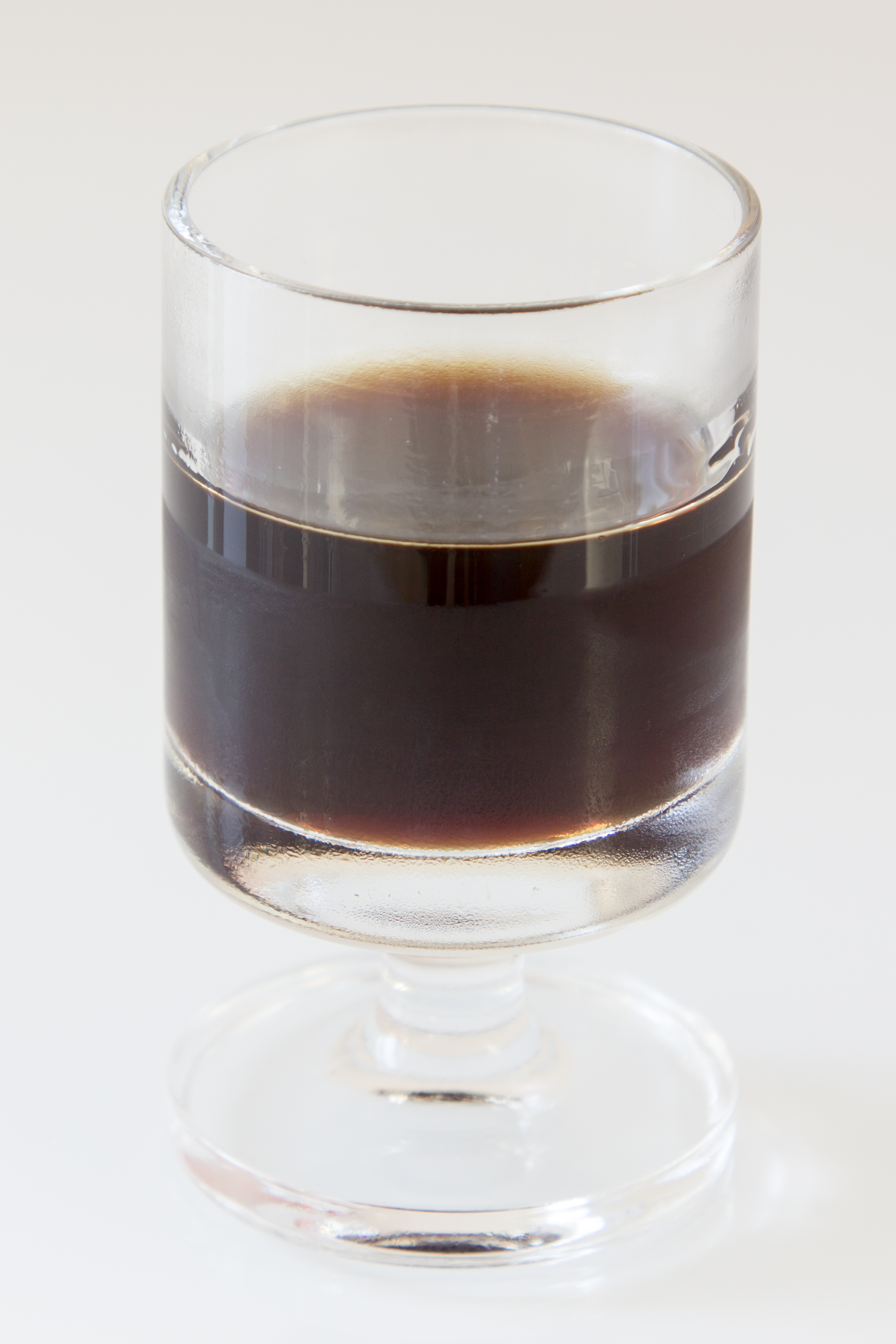
Salmiakki Koskenkorva, showing its characteristic color

Salmiakki Koskenkorva, (also Salmiakkikossu for short, or Salmari more colloquially) is a pre-mixed liqueur popular in Finland. Traditionally, the cocktail consisted of Koskenkorva Viina vodka with salmiakki extract dissolved into it. Sometimes, ground-up Tyrkisk Peber is used instead of the extract.

Salmiakki Koskenkorva is a somewhat viscous black liquid, or a dark grayish brown when of a thinner consistency. Upon closer inspection, very fine particles of carbon black are visibly suspended in the liquid.

Before the 1990s, Finland had a very thin and stratified cocktail culture. Some Finnish bars started serving a cocktail made out of ground ammonium chloride-based candy (Salmiakki in Finnish). It became a trendy drink, especially among young people, and for this reason it still has a reputation as a "teenagers' vodka". This led to the drink's prohibition from 1993 to 1995.

Only anecdotal evidence exists regarding the origin and the recipe of the beverage. The concept of mixing vodka and liquorice probably existed long before the 1990s, since both Koskenkorva Viina and Tyrkisk Peber were around before the alleged invention of the cocktail. On the other hand, Salmiakki Koskenkorva was one of the first pre-mixed cocktails sold in Finland. A well-known anecdote says that singer Jari Sillanpää invented the drink when he was working as a bartender in the late 1980s.

The taste of Salmiakki Koskenkorva strongly resembles that of black liquorice and cough medicine. This is because one of the popular brands of salmiakki used for the drink, Apteekin Salmiakki, is also used in cough medicines. It has the additional effect of increasing salivation.

== See also ==
- Sugarelly
