= Koskenkorva Viina =

Finnish liquor

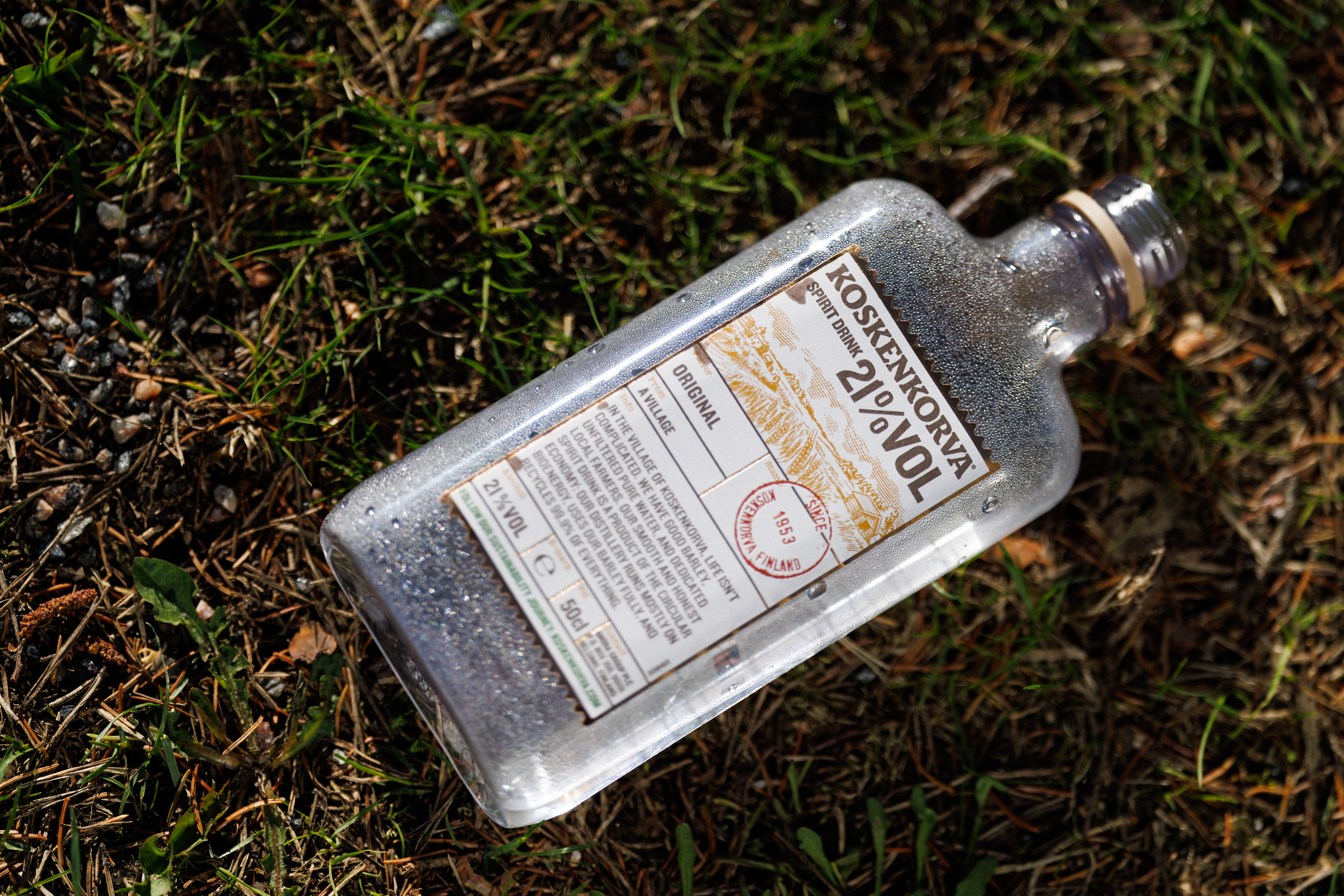
Koskenkorva bottle

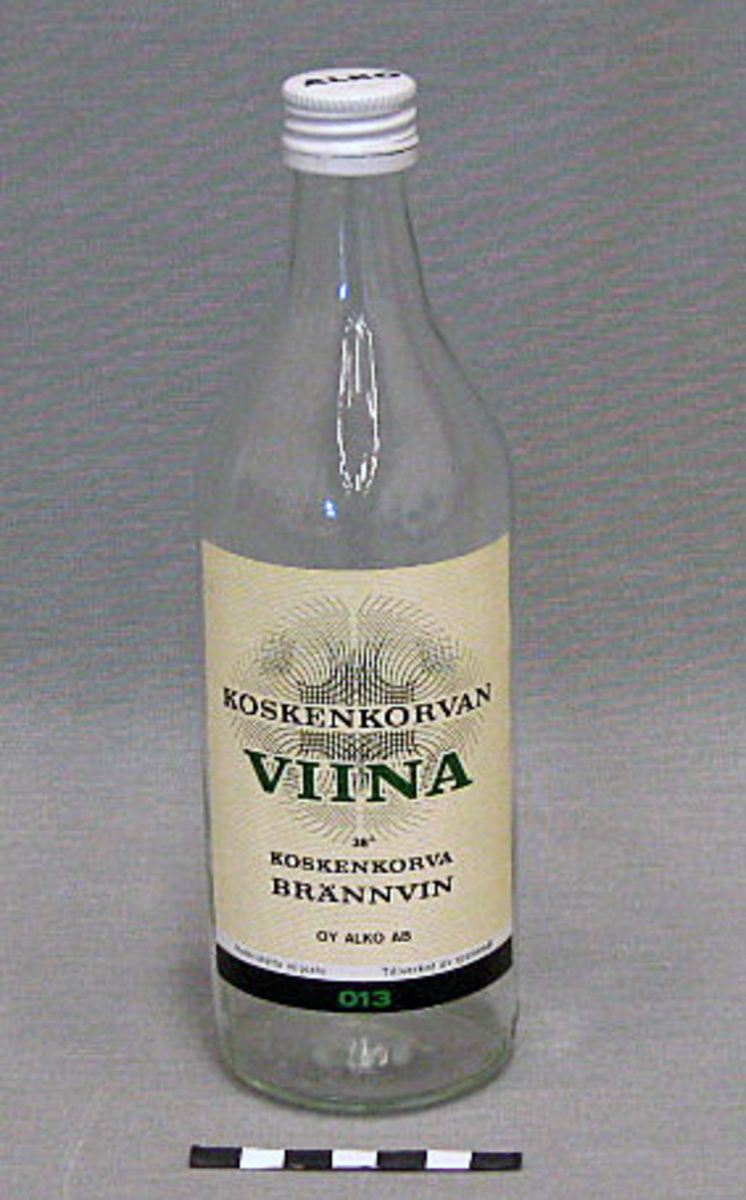
An old bottle designed by Tapio Wirkkala

Koskenkorva Viina (also known simply as Koskenkorva or Kossu) is a traditional clear spirit drink (38%) in Finland, produced by Anora Group at the distillery in Koskenkorva, Ilmajoki and bottled in Rajamäki, Nurmijärvi.

The grain (barley) alcohol is produced using 200-step continuous distillation designed to produce high-purity industrial ethanol. The drink is produced by diluting this alcohol with spring water and a very small amount of sugar. Although commonly called a vodka in English, in Finland it is not called a "vodka", but viina (see brännvin), although the word "vodka" is found in the label due to EU regulations. Koskenkorva Vodka is the same beverage (but with 40% or 60% alcohol instead of the traditional 38%) without the added sugar, intended for foreign markets, but sold in Finland also.

Besides the standard 38% near-unflavored there are several variants of Koskenkorva on the market, most notably the famous Salmiakki Koskenkorva, better known as Salmiakkikossu or Salmari, which is ammonium chloride-flavored. Another variant is the same Koskenkorva with rye instead of barley, marketed under the same concept as Koskenkorva Viina Ruis. There also exists a vanilla variant called Vanilja Koskenkorva. Finlandia Vodka, a vodka classified as "imported premium", is the same as Koskenkorva 40%, except that sugar is not added. Altia sold this brand, intended for foreign markets, to the American Brown-Forman Corporation, but remains the sole producer of Finlandia Vodka at least until 2017.

Koskenkorva is typically enjoyed cold, but can be also mixed with cola (commonly referred to as Kossukola), carbonated water (Kossuvissy, from the generic branding of mineral waters as Vichy by several Finnish producers), orange juice ("screwdriver"), energy drink (Kossubattery, after Battery, the first modern energy drink sold in Finland), or certain (hard) salty liquorice candies. The latter is often made by mixing ground tyrkisk peber candies with the drink, though other similar candies are also used, and there exists a premade salmiakki mixer for this particular purpose. A similar way of enjoying kossu is by mixing ground Fisherman's Friend lozenges to the drink; the resulting cocktail is known as "Fisu" (Helsinki slang for "fish").
