= Liquorice (confectionery) =

Type of confection or sweet food

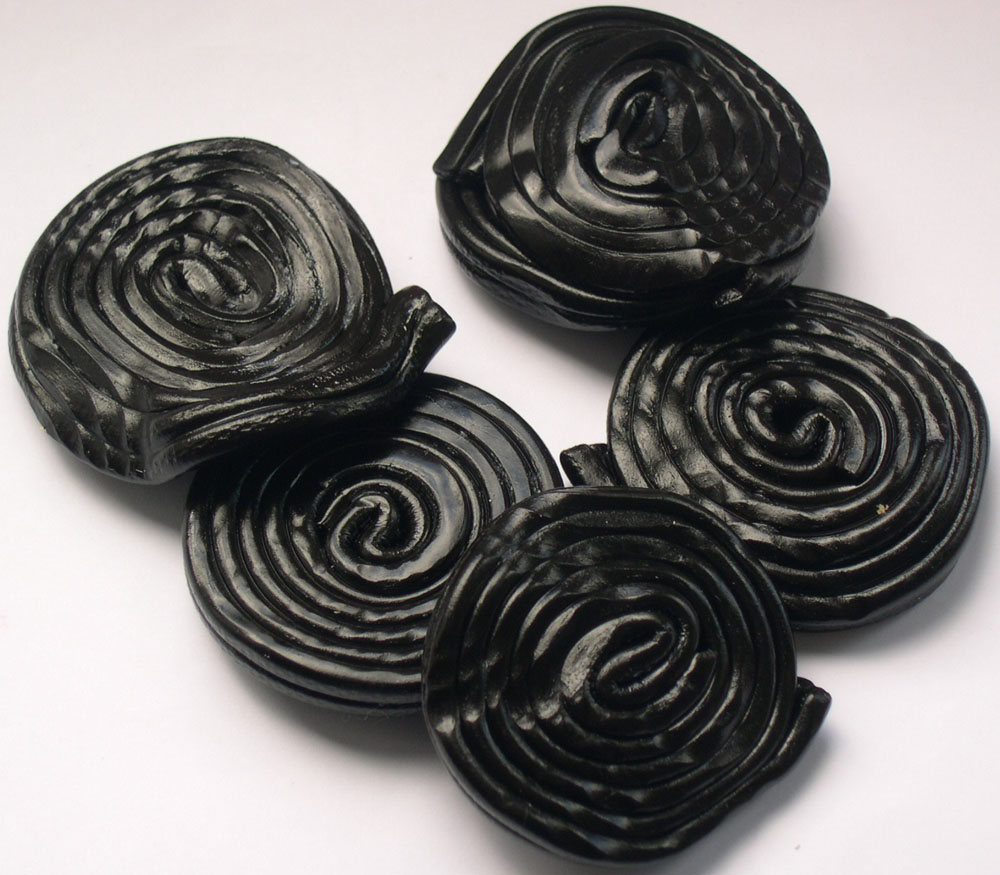
- Liquorice wheels from Haribo
- Alternative names: Black liquorice
- Type: Confectionery
- Place of origin: England
- Main ingredients: Extract of the roots of the liquorice plant, sugar, binding agent (starch, flour, gum arabic, or gelatine)

Liquorice (British English) or licorice (American English; IPA: /ˈlɪkərɪʃ, -ɪs/ LIK-ər-ish, -iss) is a confection usually flavoured and coloured black with the extract of the roots of the liquorice plant Glycyrrhiza glabra.

A variety of liquorice sweets are produced around the world. In North America, black liquorice is distinguished from similar confectionery varieties that do not contain liquorice extract but are manufactured in the form of similarly shaped chewy ropes or tubes and often called red liquorice. Black liquorice, together with anise extract, is also a common flavour in other forms of confectionery such as jellybeans. Various liquorice sweets are sold in the United Kingdom, such as liquorice allsorts. Dutch, German and Nordic liquorice typically contains ammonium chloride instead of sodium chloride, prominently so in salty liquorice, which carries a salty rather than sweet flavour.

The essential ingredients of black liquorice confectionery are liquorice extract, sugar, and a binder. The base is typically starch or flour, gum arabic, gelatine or a combination thereof. Additional ingredients are extra flavouring, beeswax for a shiny surface, ammonium chloride and molasses. Ammonium chloride is mainly used in salty liquorice candy, with concentrations up to about 8%. However, even regular liquorice candy can contain up to 2% ammonium chloride, the taste of which is less prominent because of the higher sugar concentration. Some liquorice candy is flavoured with anise oil instead of or in combination with liquorice root extract, because anise has a very similar flavour.

== History ==
Liquorice extracts have been used as sweets for millennia around the world, originating in China or the Middle East. In England in 1614, Sir George Savile invented the liquorice format still known as Pontefract cakes when he stamped discs of liquorice with the image of Pontefract Castle. The Dunhill company are credited with the development of liquorice as a confection by adding sugar in 1760.

== Production ==
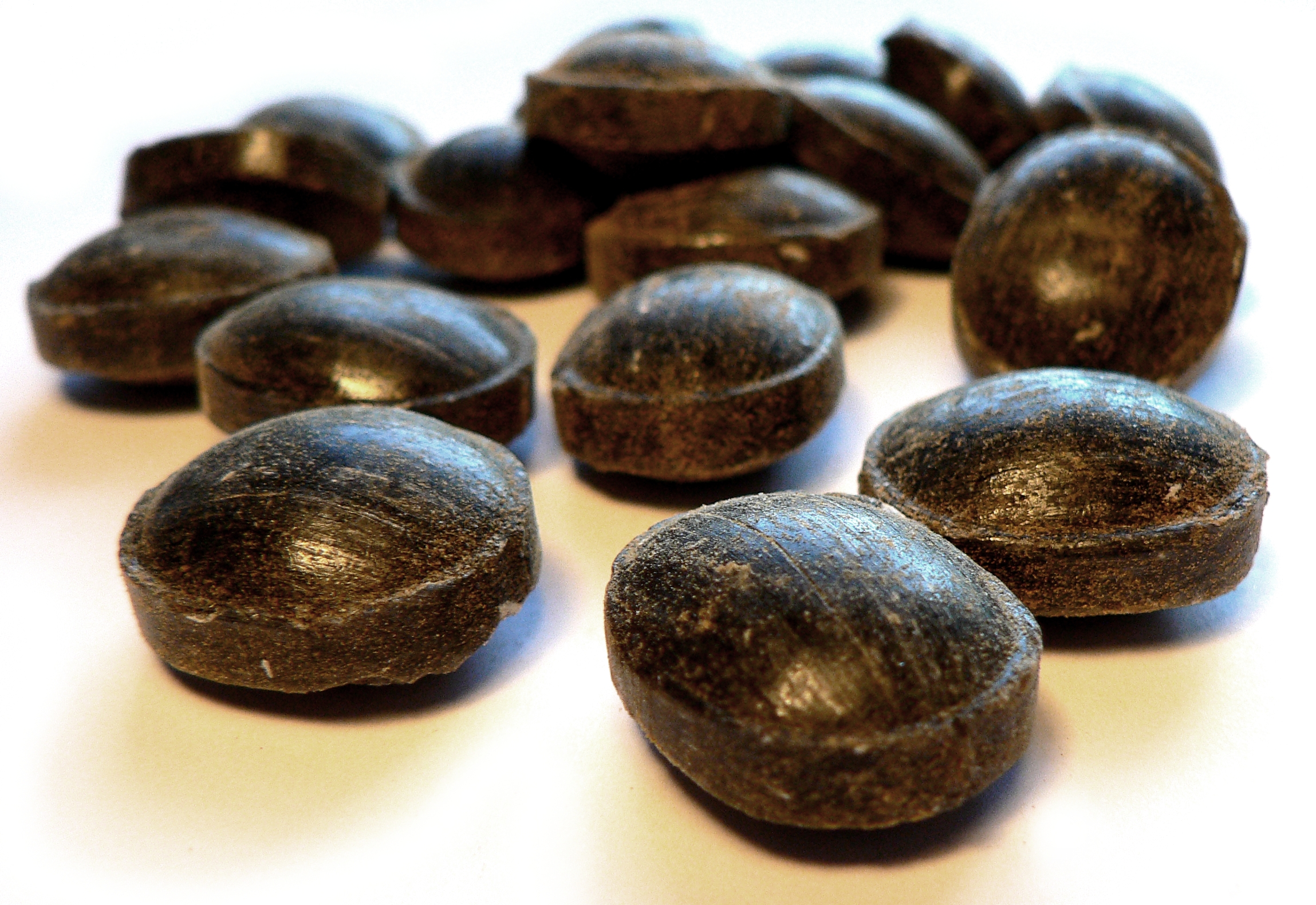
Tyrkisk peber, a Danish salty liquorice by Fazer

During manufacturing, the ingredients are dissolved in water and heated to 135 °C (275 °F). In order to obtain sweets of the desired shapes, the liquid is poured into molds that are created by impressing holes into a container filled with starch powder. The liquid is then dried and the resulting sweets are sprayed with beeswax to make their surface shiny.

== Health effects ==
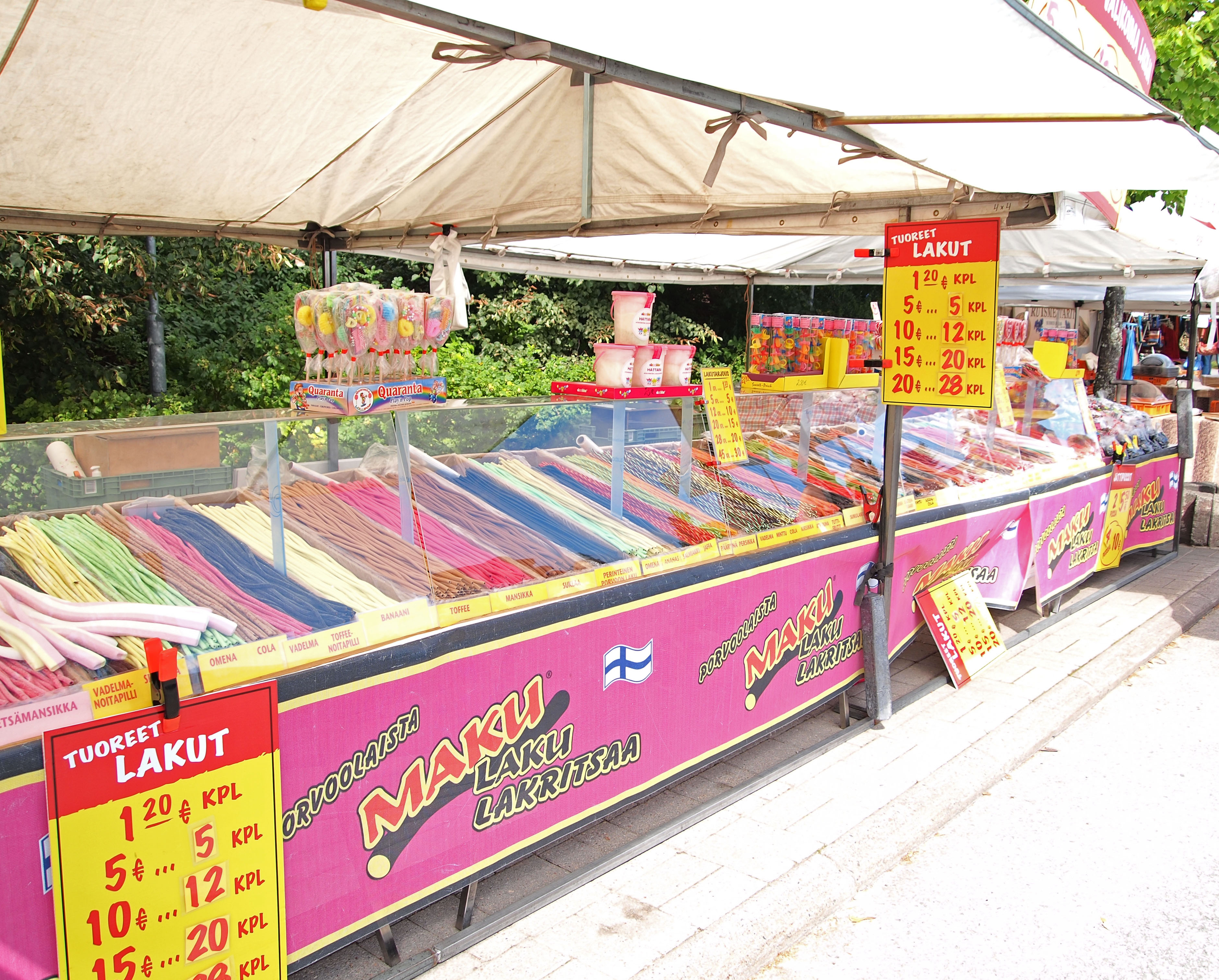
A Finnish fair special, metre-long liquorice, in various flavours and colours in Jyväskylä, Finland

The liquorice-root extract contains the natural sweetener glycyrrhizin, which is over 50 times sweeter than sucrose. Daily consumption of 50 g or more of liquorice candy for as little as two weeks may increase blood pressure by a small amount. Glycyrrhizin can cause potassium levels in the body to fall, triggering abnormal heart rhythms, oedema (swelling), lethargy, and congestive heart failure in some people.

Excessive black liquorice consumption can cause chloride-resistant metabolic alkalosis and pseudohyperaldosteronism. In one particularly extreme case from 2020, a man from Massachusetts ate a bag and a half of black liquorice every day for several weeks, leading to death due to chronic high levels of glycyrrhetinic acid, a principal metabolite of glycyrrhizinic acid. The resultant pseudohyperaldosteronism led to hypokalaemia so severe that the man suffered a fatal heart attack.

== Red liquorice ==
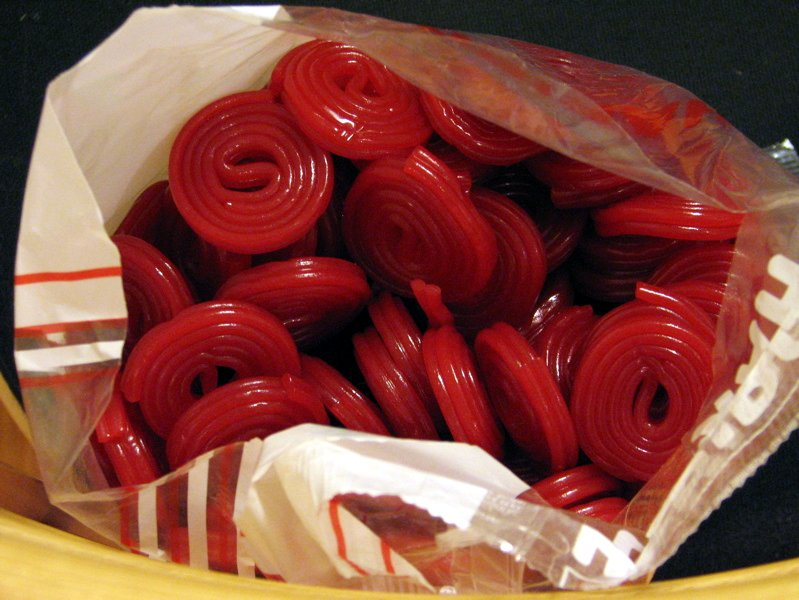
Red liquorice wheels

While the product known as red liquorice (red licorice) may have a recipe and manufacturing process similar to a common type of liquorice confection (a starchy or gummy binder with sugar added, extruded into the shape of a rope or tube with a chewy consistency), it is not made with actual liquorice but with other flavourings such as strawberry, cherry, raspberry, or cinnamon. More recently, products have been introduced in a wider variety of colours and flavours, including apple, mango, blackcurrant, and watermelon.

While the common name for these confections has become "red liquorice" or often simply "liquorice" due to their shape and texture, they do not have the taste of liquorice. "Black" in "black liquorice" would formerly have been redundant, but has become a retronym in North America.

== Varieties ==
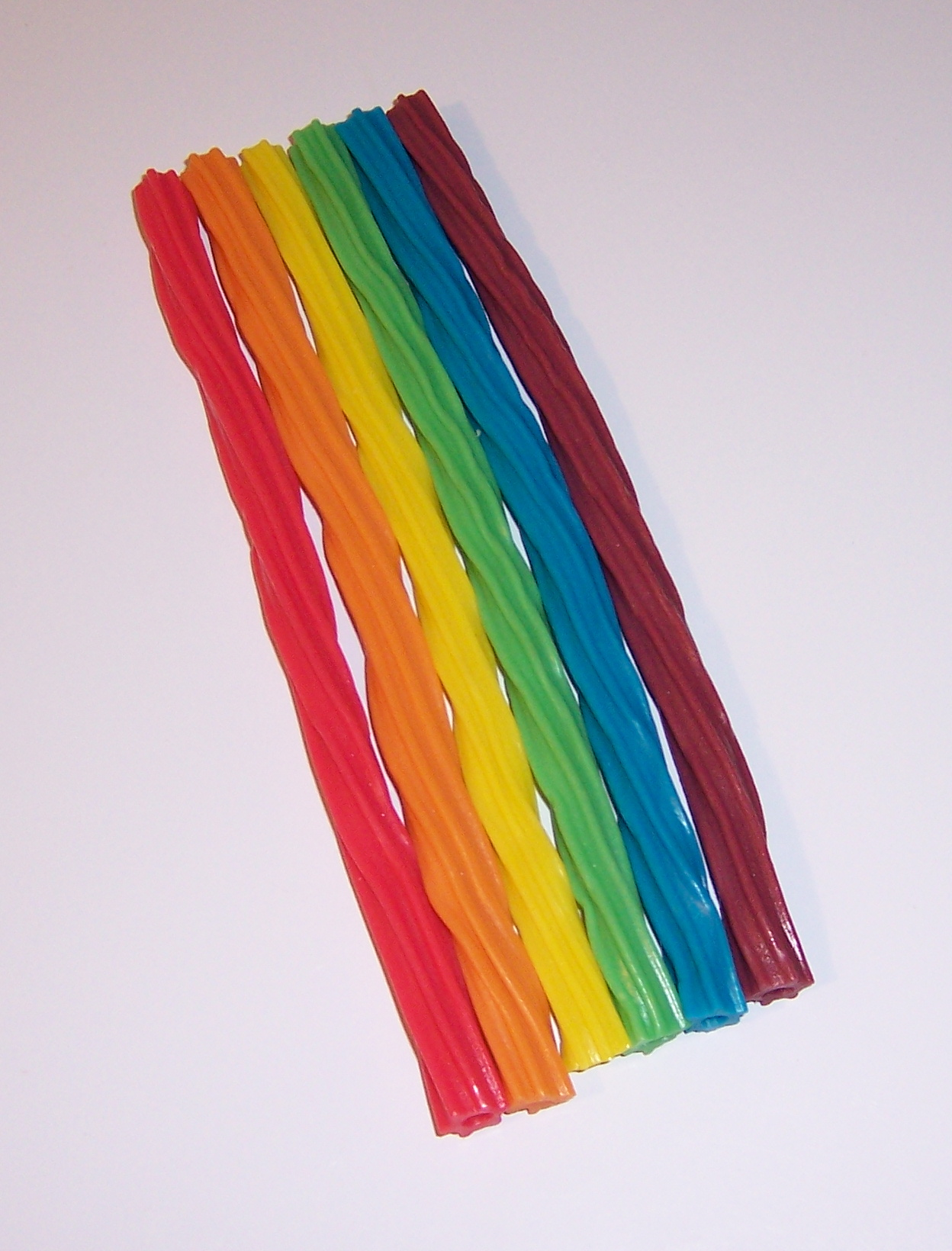
Rainbow liquorice twist candy

- Choo Choo Bar
- Crows
- Good & Plenty
- Liquorice allsorts
- London drops
- Negro, a brand of liquorice sold in Eastern Europe known for its dark colour, attributed to the use of activated carbon in its recipe
- Pontefract cake
- Red Vines
- Salty liquorice (Salmiak liquorice, a specialty popular in Northern Europe)
- Sugarelly, a liquorice drink
- Turkish pepper
- Twizzlers, the 1845 original ones
- Victory V, liquorice throat lozenges that formerly contained ether and chloroform as active ingredients
- Vigroids

== See also ==
- Licorice International

== Sources ==
- Media related to Liquorice as food at Wikimedia Commons
- Liquorice at www.food-info.net
