= Apteekin Salmiakki =

Brand of salty liquorice

- Product type: cough drop, confectionery
- Current owner: Haganol
- Country: Finland
- Introduced: 1951
- Markets: Nordic countries
- Website: haganol.fi

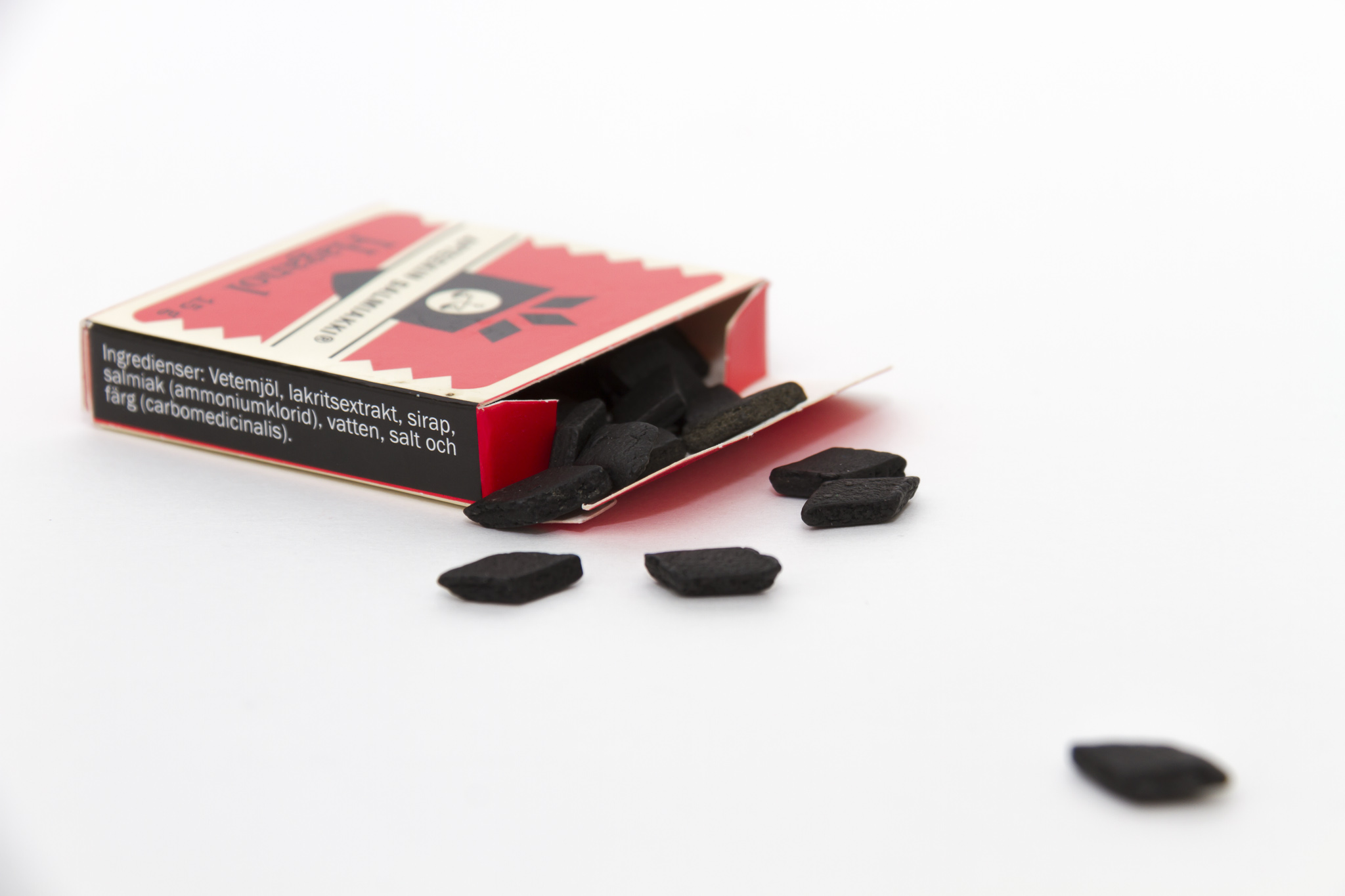
Product content

Apteekin Salmiakki (trademarked in English as Apothecary's Salmiac) is a lozenge-shaped hard candy brand of salmiakki, or salty liquorice candy, made by the Finnish company Haganol. "Salmiac" is a term for ammonium chloride, one of the principal flavourings in salty liquorice.

Apteekin Salmiakki was first sold in bulk as a cough drop or throat lozenge to pharmacies, where the staff would package the lozenges for sale in white paper bags. Currently the candy is mainly sold in prepacked small boxes. It has been manufactured with the same recipe since 1951.

== See also ==
- Tyrkisk Peber
- Lakrisal
- Fisherman's Friend
- Victory V
- Salty liquorice, a type of liquorice confectionery
