= Vigroids =

Liquorice sweet

Nigroids tin container by Ferris & Co. Ltd

Vigroids (also Mighty Imps, formerly Nigroids) was a brand of liquorice sweet. The small black pellets were particularly marketed as an expectorant lozenge for singers, using the slogan "for clarity of voice". The Nigroids/Vigroids brand was acquired by Ernest Jackson & Company Ltd of Crediton, Devon, England, in 1974. After several changes of ownership, Ernest Jackson became a subsidiary of Kraft Foods in 2011, and later of Mondelez International.

The principal ingredient of Vigroids is liquorice block juice. The company warns that liquorice can raise blood pressure, and that those with a history of hypertension should not take too many. They suggest limiting consumption to 10 per day. No sugar is used. Small quantities of other flavourings such as menthol, eucalyptus and peppermint are added to help the pellets act as a breath mint.

== History ==
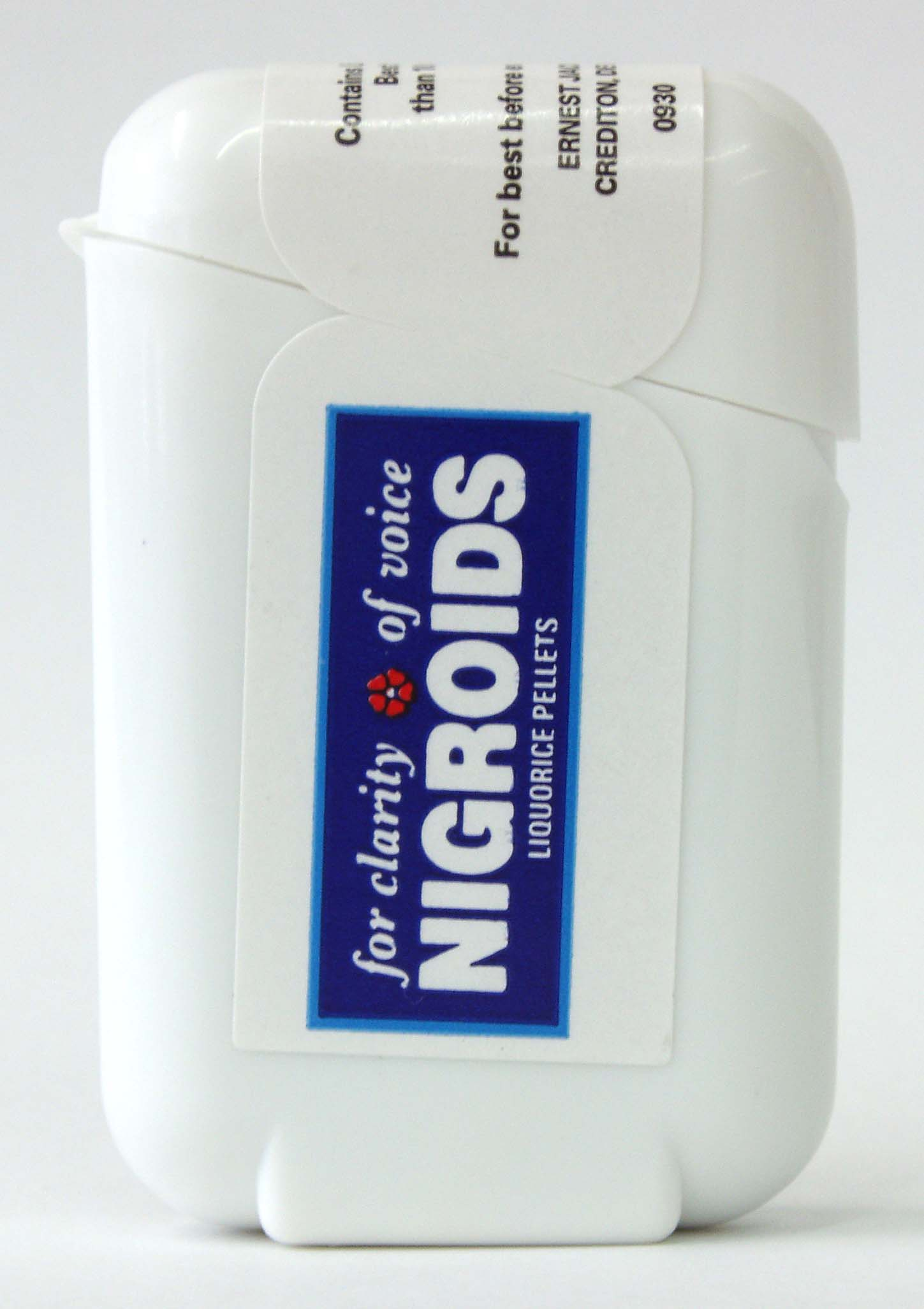
Plastic dispenser containing Nigroids liquorice pellets

Nigroids were invented by Ferris & Co. Ltd., manufacturing chemists of Bristol, England, in 1900. The company promoted them with the slogan:

For Hoarseness, "Tickling of the Throat," etc. They afford protection to the Voice, Throat, and Chest, against ill-effects of fog, cold and damp. Invaluable to singers and speakers.

Ernest Jackson acquired the brand in 1974. In 2010 the name was changed from "Nigroids" to "Vigroids".

Vigroids/Mighty Imps were listed on the Ernest Jackson Web site until October 2014, but no longer appeared from January 2015.

== See also ==
- List of breath mints
- Victory V
- Fisherman's Friend
- Apteekin Salmiakki
