= Pirate coins =

Candies popular in Europe

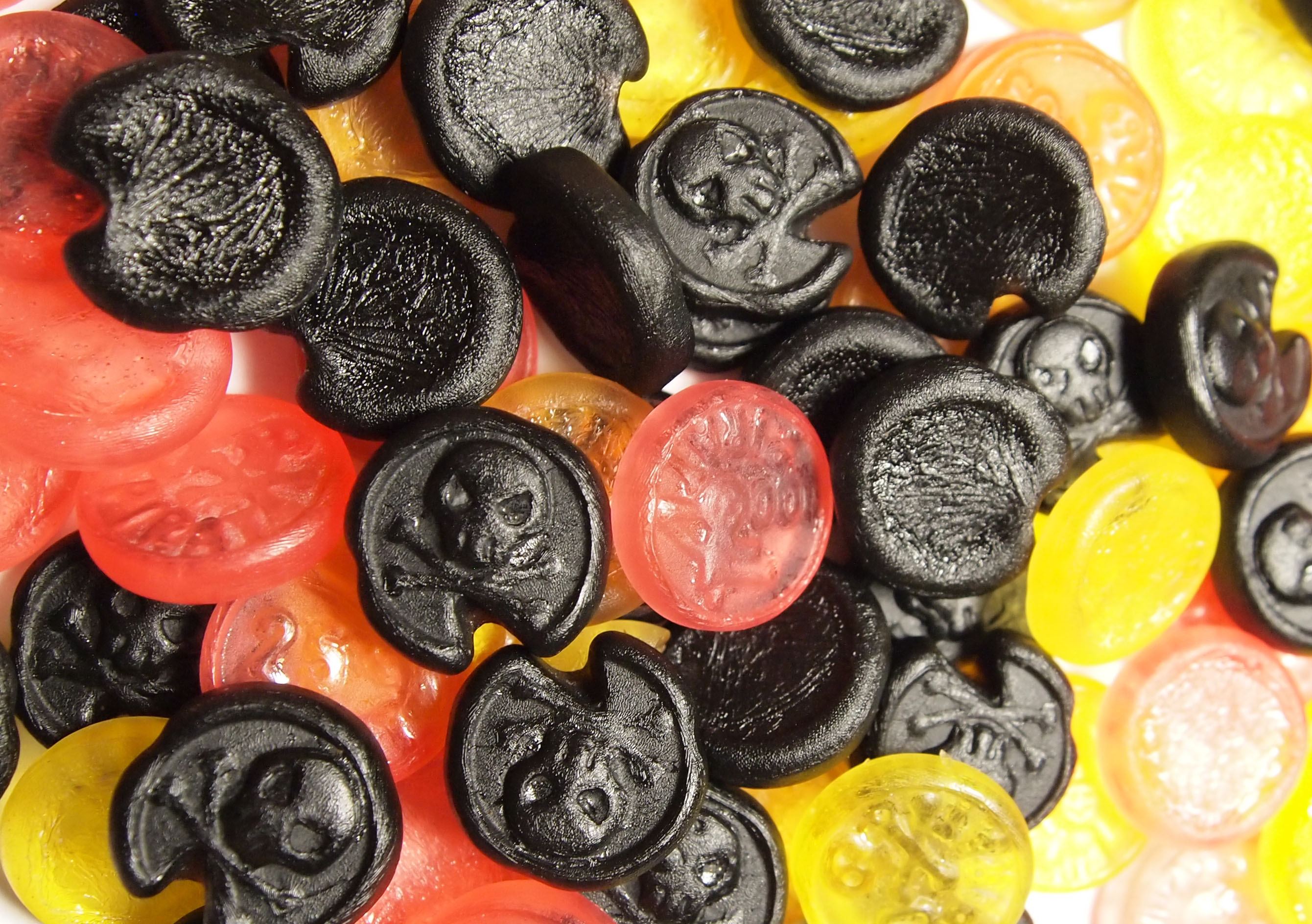
Fazer pirate coins

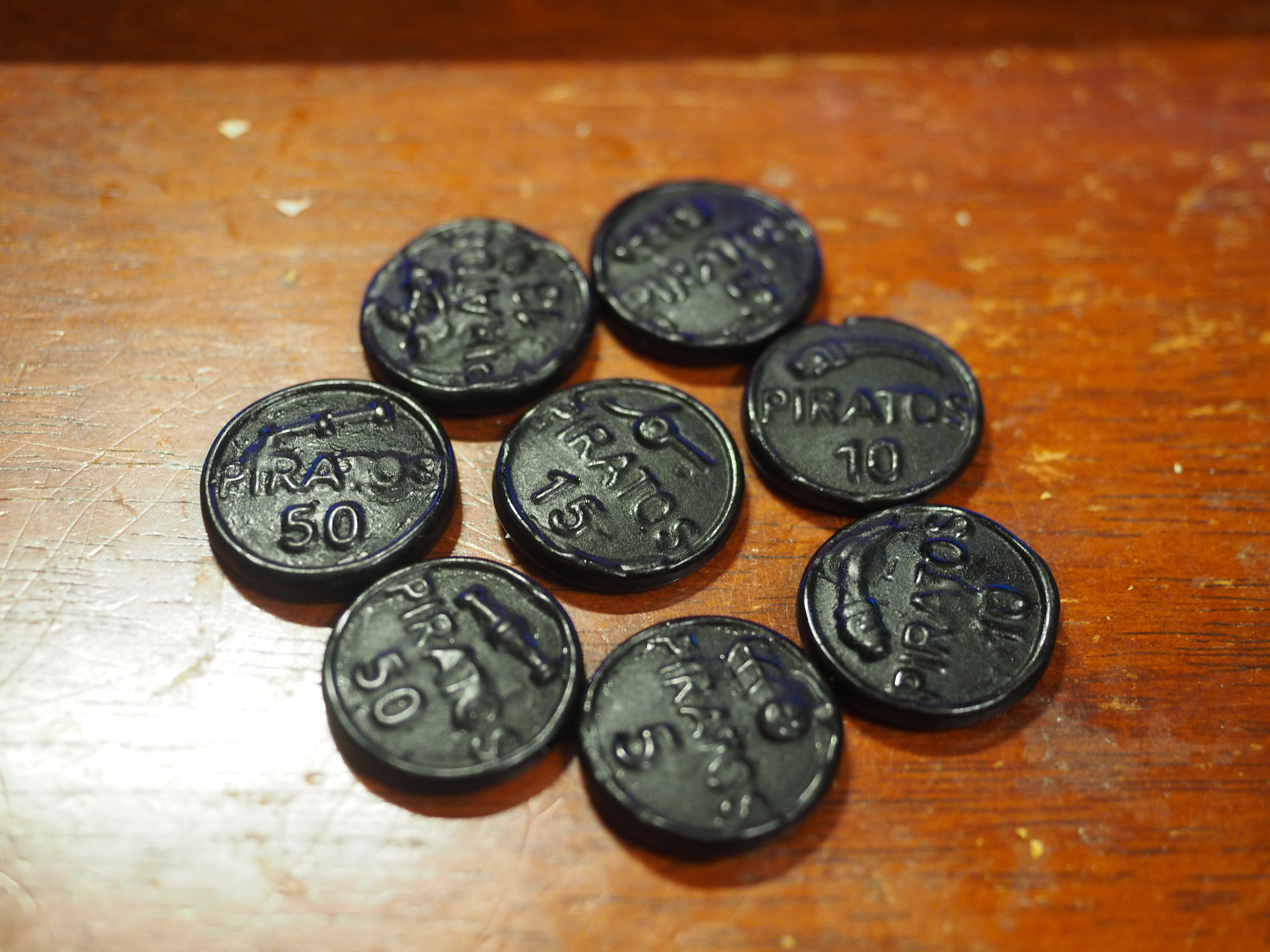
Haribo pirate coins

Pirate coins are salty liquorice flavoured candies popular in Europe, especially the Nordic countries. The candies are coin-shaped and feature images associated with pirates, such as flintlocks, cutlasses, skull and crossbones symbols, and parrots.

Pirate coins have been produced by Fazer in Finland and by Haribo in Germany and Denmark.

Haribo's Piratos was introduced in 1955 and invented in Denmark and based on Scandinavian traditional salty liquorice. Today, they are still produced in Haribo's Danish factory. The product is still very popular in Denmark and available in almost every supermarket, store, gas station, cinema, and in vending machines. Haribo pirate coins are available in two formulations, Piratos and Super Piratos, where the latter has a slightly higher ammonium chloride content; both flavours are available in small and large bags.

Fazer's pirate coins were introduced in the 1970s. They caused controversy in the late 1970s and early 1980s because of their large size, which carried a risk of suffocation when eaten by small children. In February 2013, Fazer reintroduced the pirate coins but in smaller size. Fazer pirate coins are also available in fruit flavours.

== See also ==
- Pontefract cakes
