= Victory V =

British brand of liquorice-flavoured lozenges

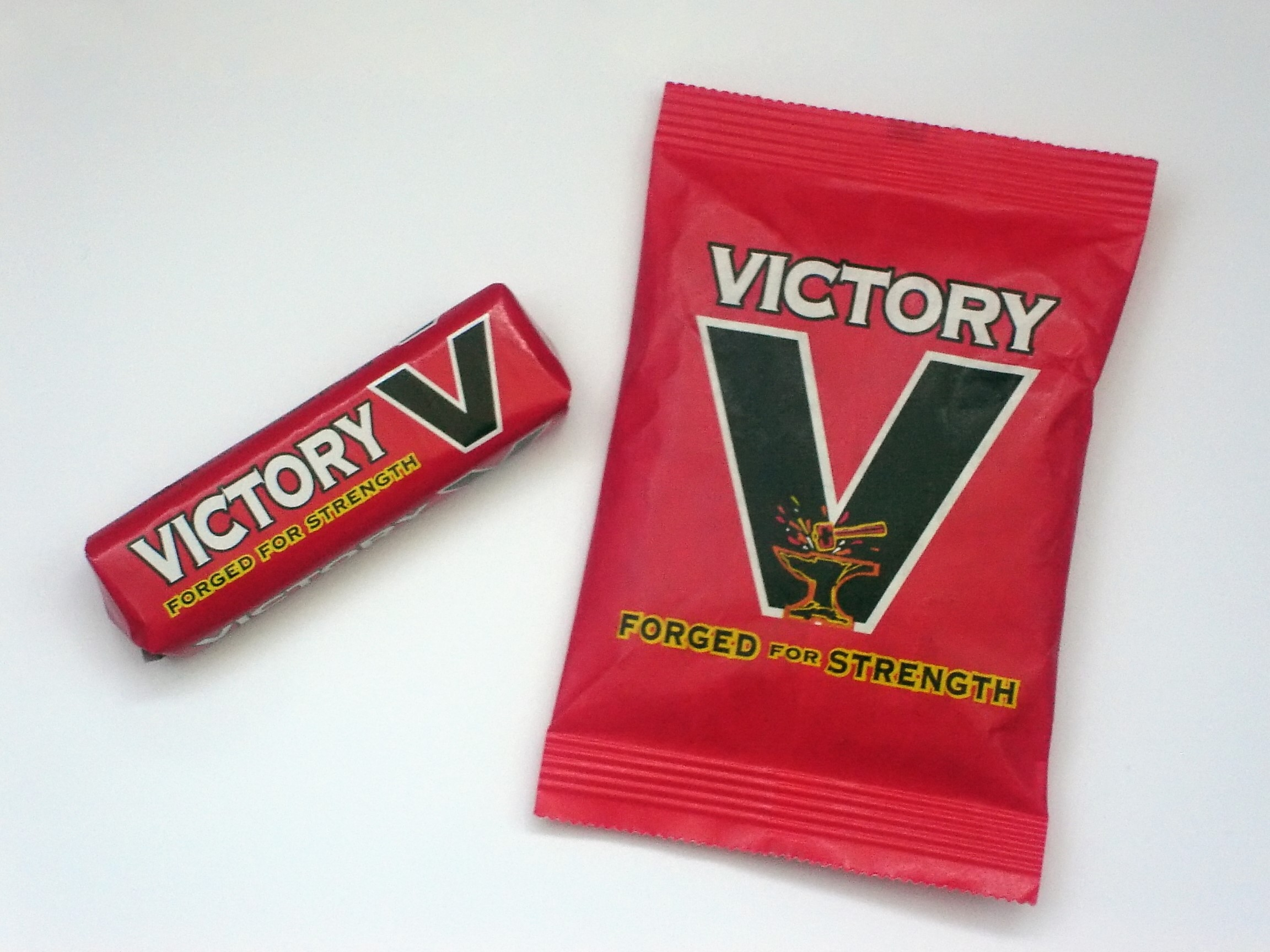
- A packet and a roll of lozenges
- Type: Lozenge
- Place of origin: United Kingdom
- Region or state: Nelson, Lancashire
- Created by: Thomas Fryer & Edward Smith
- Invented: 1864

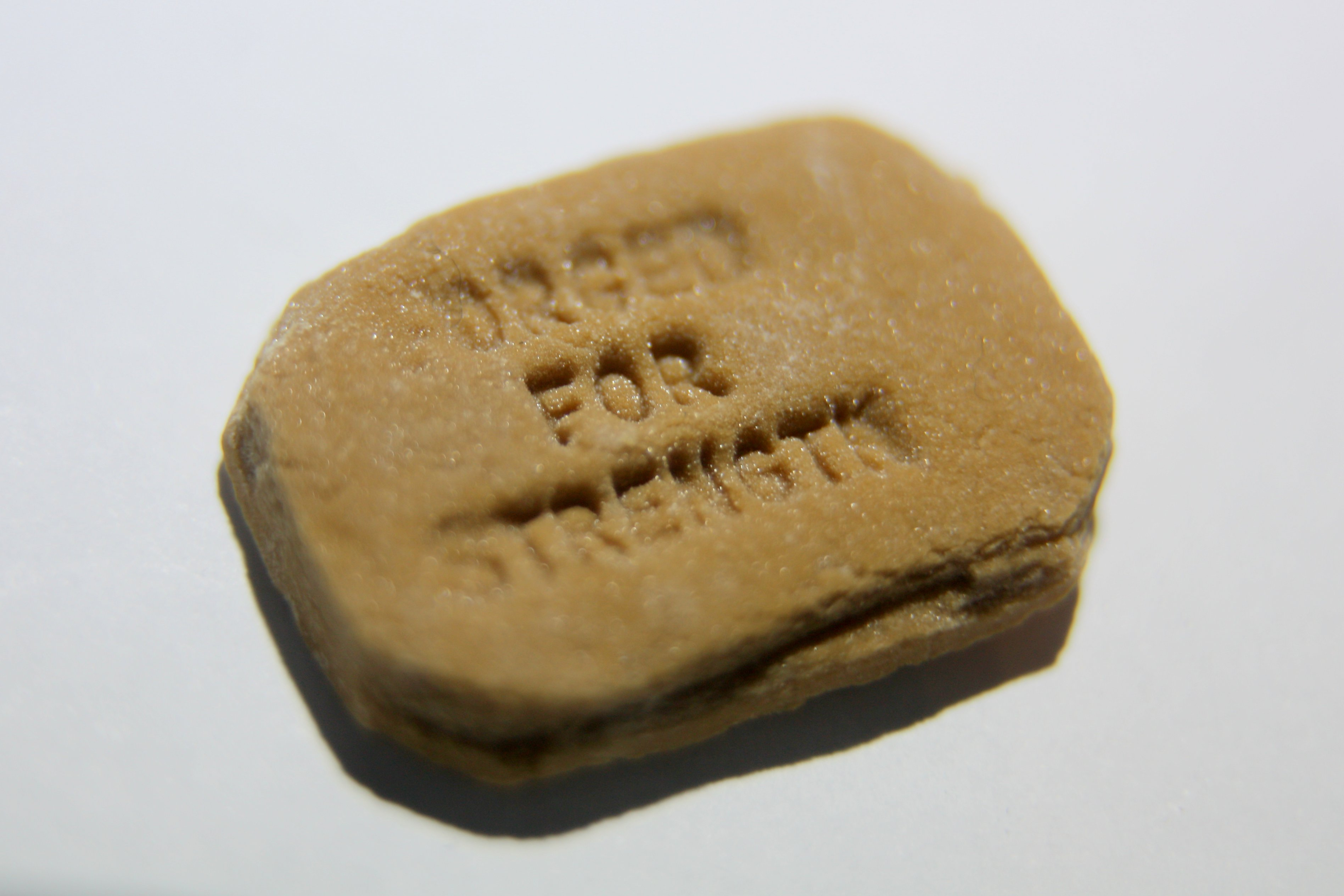
A Victory V sweet, "Forged For Strength"

Victory V is a British brand of liquorice-flavoured lozenges. Originally manufactured in Nelson, Lancashire, they were devised by Thomas Fryer and Edward Smith MD in 1864 and were initially made by hand to ensure that each sweet contained the correct amount of therapeutic ingredients: ether, liquorice and chlorodyne (a patent medicine containing laudanum, cannabis and chloroform).

In 1959, a film was produced by Red Rose Films called The Story of Victory-V, documenting the production of Victory V lozenges and other products of the Nelson Victory V factory.

In the 1960s they acquired the Alverthorpe firm of A. Talbot and Son. Victory V lozenges are available in specialist shops and online, but no longer contain chloroform or ether. However, their scent and flavour is still vividly reminiscent of diethyl ether – recreated via artificial means to preserve the original flavour. Today they are manufactured by Ernest Jackson & Co. Ltd. in Crediton, Devon.

== See also ==
- Fisherman's Friend
- Vigroids
- Apteekin Salmiakki
