= Lakrisal =

Liquorice candy

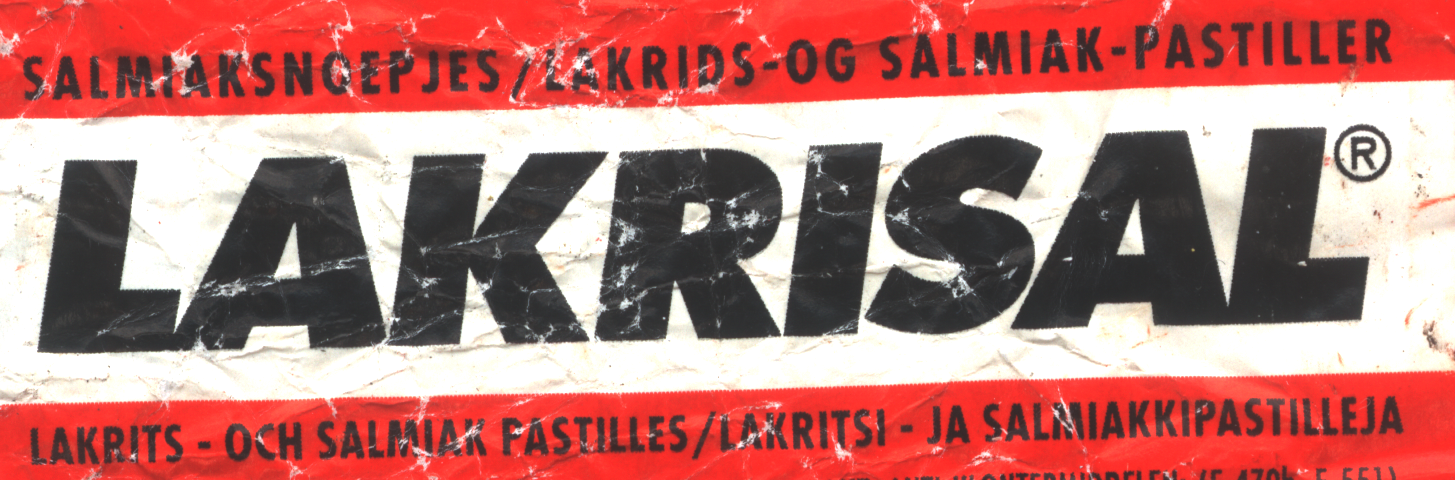
Lakrisal wrapper.

Lakrisal is a Malaco brand of salty liquorice (liquorice and ammonium chloride flavored candy) sold in the Nordic countries and the Netherlands.

Unlike most salty liquorice candies, Lakrisal does not contain any starch or gum arabic (E414). Instead, it is made almost entirely of sugar, liquorice, and ammonium chloride. Because of this, Lakrisal drops are powdery, and have been pressed to stay in one piece like tablets.

Persons suffering from hypertension should avoid excessive intake of Lakrisal.

Lakrisal is also unlike most salty liquorice candies by not being black. Instead, it is a very light brownish gray colour. Lakrisal drops are disk-shaped, about 18 mm in diameter and about 4 mm thick. They are sold in tubes of about 20 drops each.

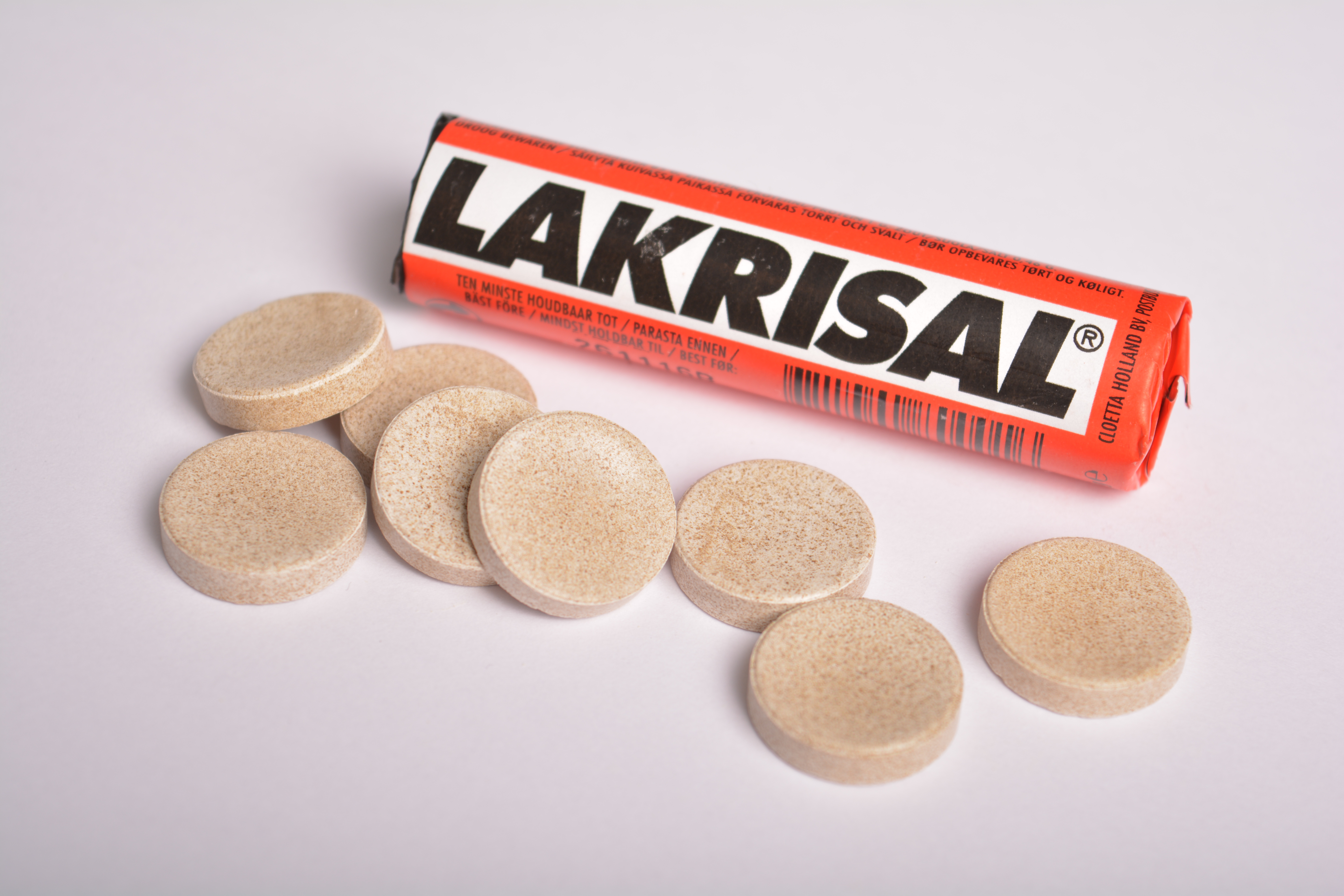
A Lakrisal tube with several drops.

== History ==
Lakrisal is a direct continuation of a similar product Bronzol, launched as a throat tablet, which was advertised under the slogan "Hälsan för halsen - Bronzol!" ("Health for the throat - Bronzol!", sung to the melody of Shave and a Haircut). Liquorice or salmiak throat tablets have been produced and sold in the Nordic countries since the 1950s. Even the cough medicine brand Quiller-syrup uses the same flavors.

== Production ==
Lakrisal is produced by Cloetta; formerly by Leaf International.

== Varieties ==
In the 1980s, a new lemon-flavoured variety of Lakrisal was introduced. It proved quite unpopular and was soon discontinued. Another flavour was the "hot" Lakrisal that included chili pepper powder and pepper oil.
