= Salty liquorice =

Variety of liquorice

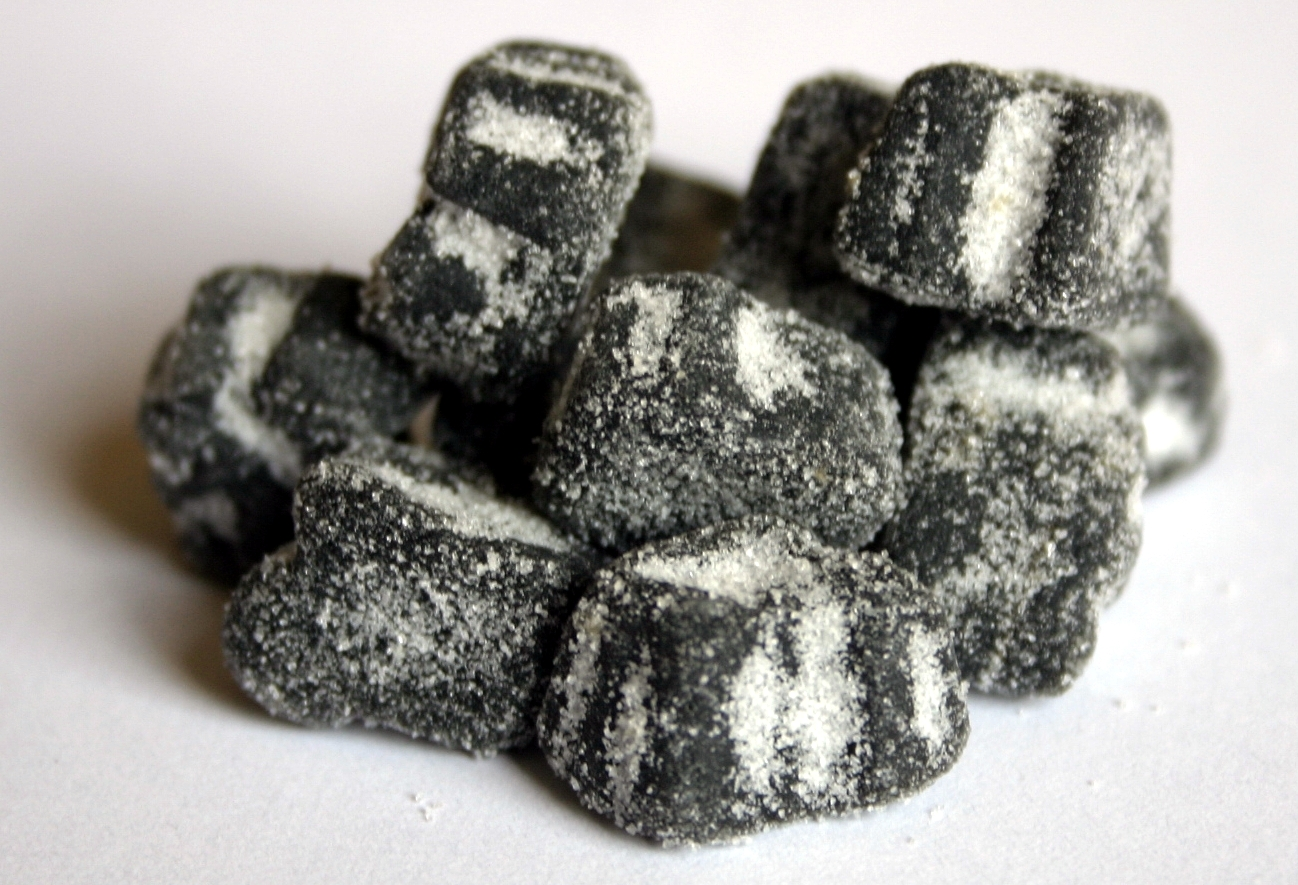
- Swedish variety of extra salty liquorice candy called Djungelvrål
- Alternative names: salmiak or salmiac liquorice
- Type: confectionery
- Course: Food
- Place of origin: Northern Europe
- Main ingredients: liquorice-root extract, salmiak salt (sal ammoniac; ammonium chloride), sugar, glucose syrup, modified starch, brown sugar syrup, maltodextrin, sometimes anise oil

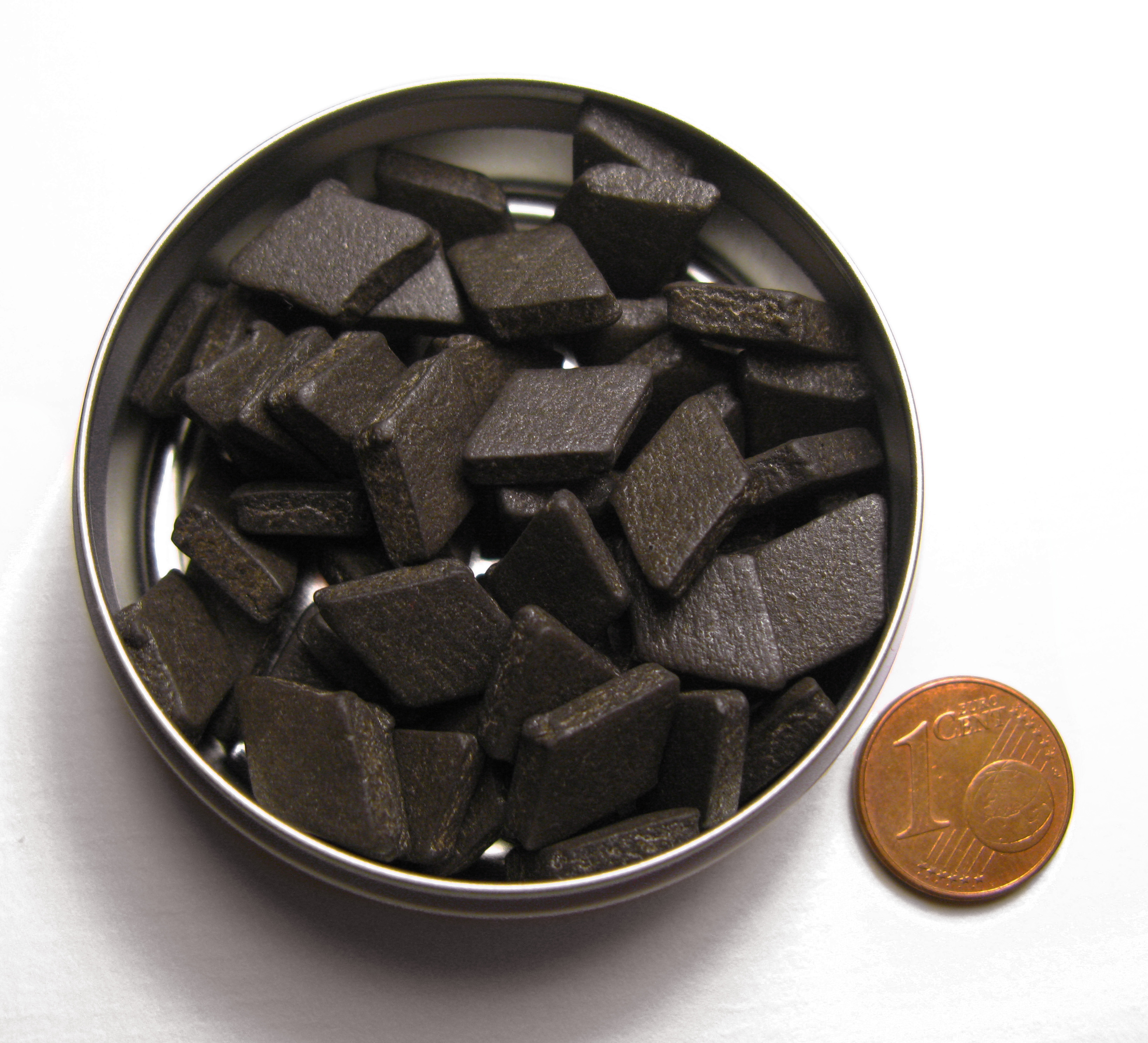
A pocket tin containing small salmiak liquorice pastilles in the traditional diamond shape. Pastilles are usually of the hard liquorice lozenge variety.

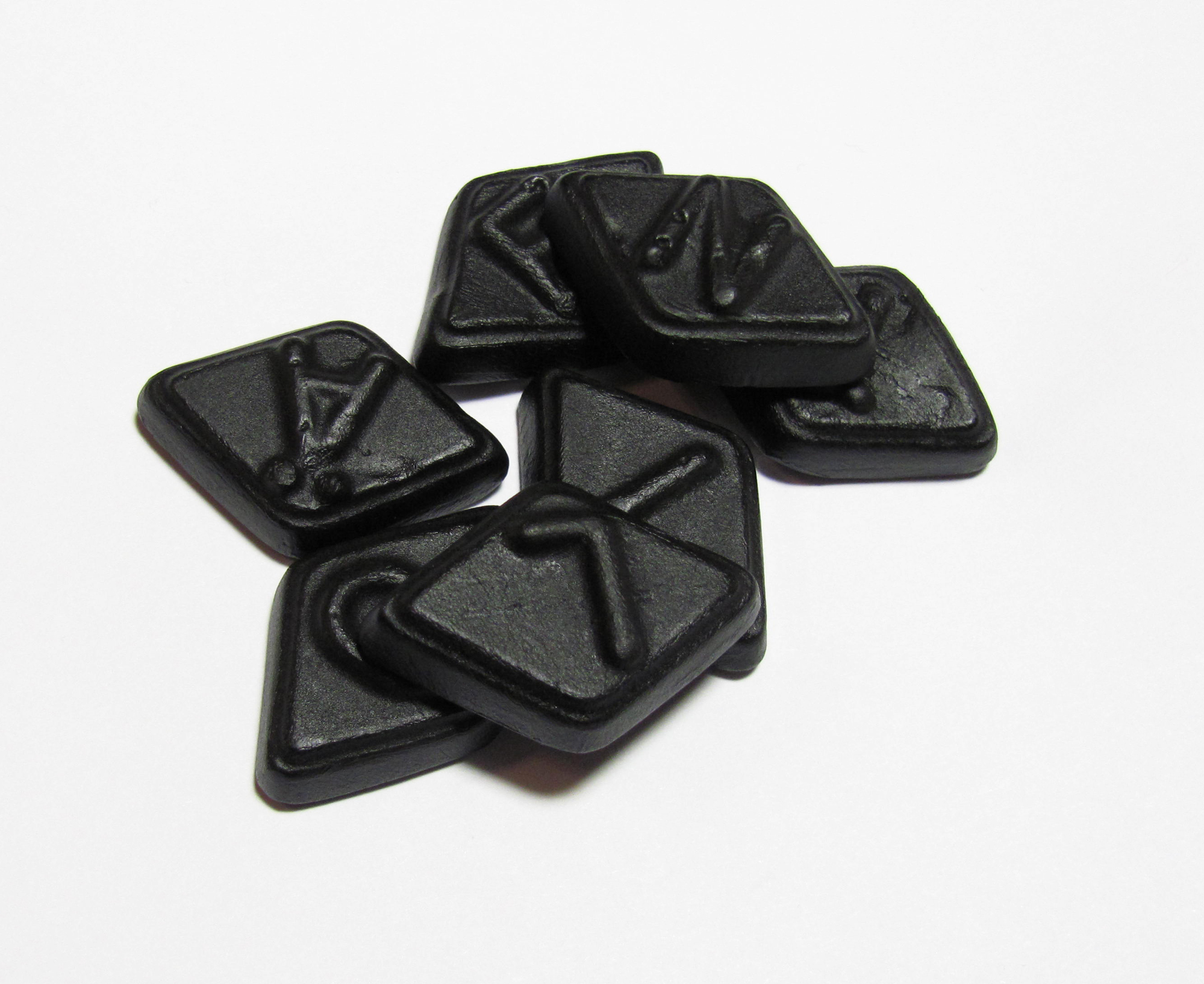
Salmiak liquorice candy in the traditional diamond shape. These candies are usually of the soft to medium-soft liquorice variety.

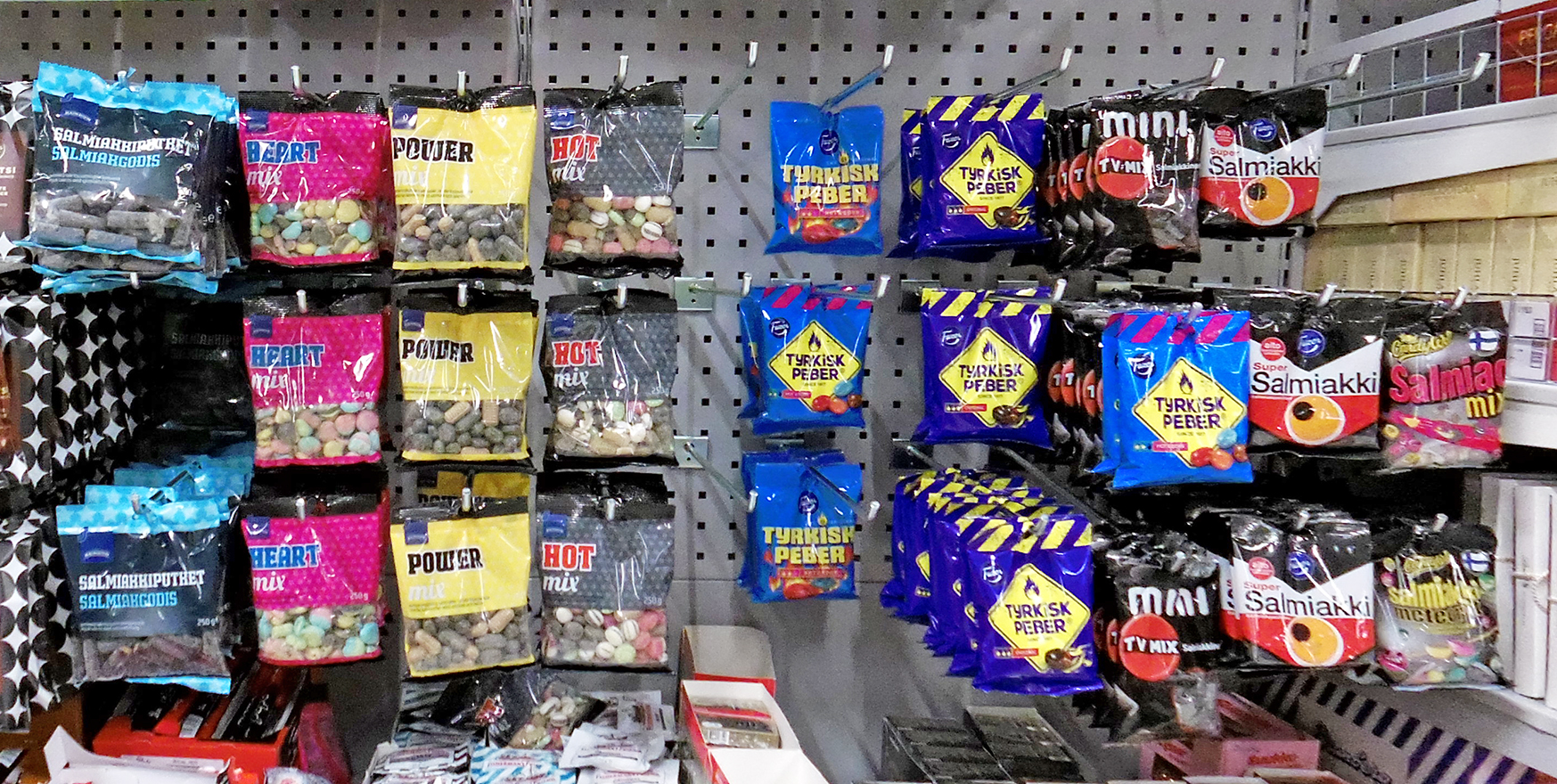
Salmiakki candy bags

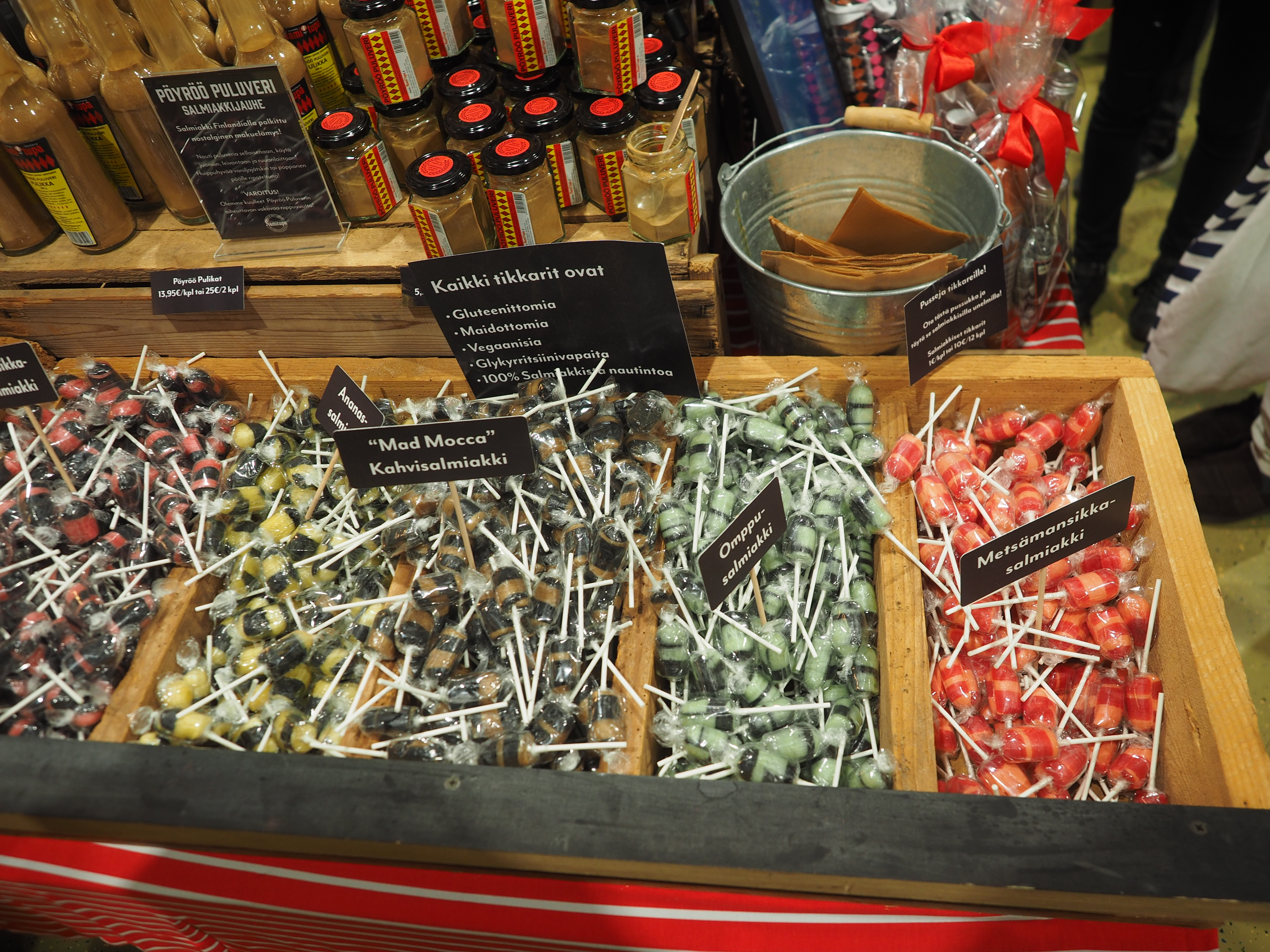
Salmiak lollipops and powders

Salty liquorice, (Note: Danish: saltlakrids, Dutch: salmiakdrop, Finnish: salmiakki, German: Salmiakpastille, Icelandic: saltlakkrís, Norwegian: salt lakris, Swedish: saltlakrits) also known as salmiak liquorice, salmiac liquorice or (in Finland) salmiakki, is a variety of liquorice flavoured with salmiak salt (sal ammoniac; ammonium chloride), and is a common confection found in the Nordic countries, Benelux, and northern Germany.

Salmiak salt gives salty liquorice an astringent, salty taste, akin to that of tannins—a characteristic of red wines, which adds bitterness and astringency to the flavour. Consuming salmiak liquorice can stimulate either a savoury or non-savoury palate and response. Anise oil can also be added to salty liquorice. Extra-salty liquorice is coated with salmiak salt or salmiak powder, or sometimes table salt.

Salty liquorice candy and pastilles are almost always black or very dark brown and can range from soft candy to hard pastille, and sometimes brittle. The other colours used are white and variants of grey. Salty liquorice or salmiak is used to flavour products such as ice creams, syrups, chewing gum, snus and alcoholic beverages.

== History ==
Sal ammoniac (ammonium chloride) has a history of being used as a cough medicine, as it works as an expectorant. Finnish author Jukka Annala speculates that salty liquorice has its origins in pharmacy stores that manufactured their own cough medicine. Where and when ammonium chloride and liquorice were first combined to produce salty liquorice is unclear, but by the 1930s it was produced in Finland, Norway, Denmark, Sweden and the Netherlands as a pastille.

== Types ==
Different languages often refer to salty liquorice as either "salmiak liquorice" (Swedish: Salmiaklakrits; Danish: Salmiaklakrids), or simply "salt liquorice" (Swedish: Saltlakrits; Danish: Saltlakrids). The Dutch refer to it as "zoute drop" or "dubbelzoute drop" (double salted liquorice). In Germany, they are commonly known as salt liquorice (Salzlakritz) candy and salmiak pastilles (Salmiakpastillen) or simply Salmiak, in contrast to sweet liquorice (Süßlakritz) candy. A traditional shape for salty liquorice pastilles is a black diamond-shaped lozenge. In Finnish, it is known as salmiakki.

The strength of the confectionery depends on the amount of food grade ammonium chloride (salmiak salt) used, which varies by country and what's considered a safe amount. In Sweden, for example, the most popular types of salty liquorice contain an average of 7% of ammonium chloride. In 2012, there was a European Union proposal to limit the amount to 0.3%, which was met with wide opposition. Although the European Union now regulates the use of ammonium chloride to 0.3% in most foodstuffs, there is no specific restriction for it in liquorice or ice cream. At a level of up to 7.99% ammonium chloride, salmiak pastilles are considered a "traditionally-applied medicine to assist expectoration in the airways".

An antibacterial effect can be attributed to the neutralization of the slightly acidic ammonium chloride (pH about 5.5) by the relatively alkaline saliva (pH about 7), whereby ammonia is released, which has a disinfecting effect:

$$\mathrm{NH_4^+ + OH^- \longrightarrow NH_3 + H_2O}$$
Reaction of (ammonium)-ions in base solution to ammonia and water.

== Health and safety ==
=== Germany and European Union ===
Before implementation of the current European Union community-wide list of permitted flavouring substances used in food, national food legislation in Germany required that a content from above 2% ammonium chloride (salmiak salt) in salty liquorice was required to carry the label "Adult Liquorice – Not Children's Liquorice" (Erwachsenenlakritz – Kein Kinderlakritz) on packaging. When the ingredient content of ammonium chloride (salmiak salt) was between 4.49% and 7.99%, the declaration "extra strong" (extra stark) was also required on packaging. More than 7.99% of ammonium chloride (salmiak salt) was not permitted in Germany at that point. Since then, the upper limit on ammonium chloride has been lifted.

== Other uses ==
In addition to being used in candy, salmiak is also used to flavour vodka, chocolate, distilled rye brandy, ice cream, cola drinks, snus, and meat.

== Products ==
- Apteekin Salmiakki, a Finnish brand of salty liquorice candy
- Lakrisal, a salty salmiak candy
- Pantteri/Katten, a Finnish gummy salmiak candy
- Pirate coins Parate or "Piratos" coins, a salty liquorice shaped like coins with pirate motifs
- Salzige Heringe (Salty Herrings), a popular German brand of salmiak liquorice candy shaped like herring, produced by the German candy manufacturer Katjes, currently containing 1.8% salmiak salt and 6% liquorice root extract.
- Salmiakki Koskenkorva, a Finnish salmiak-flavoured vodka brand
- Tyrkisk Peber (Turkish pepper), a popular brand of salmiak candy

== Gallery ==
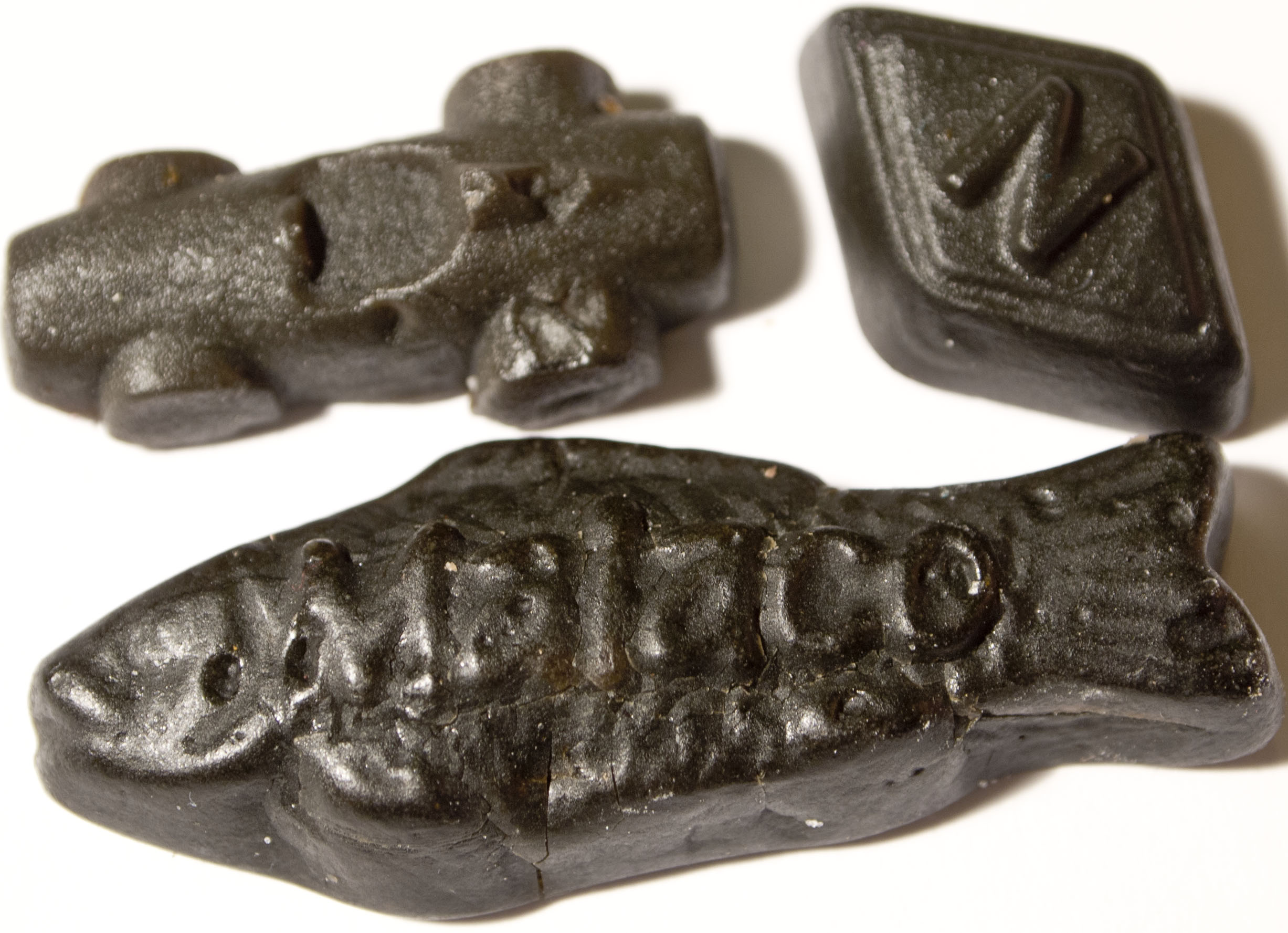
Salmiak liquorice candy produced in various shapes.

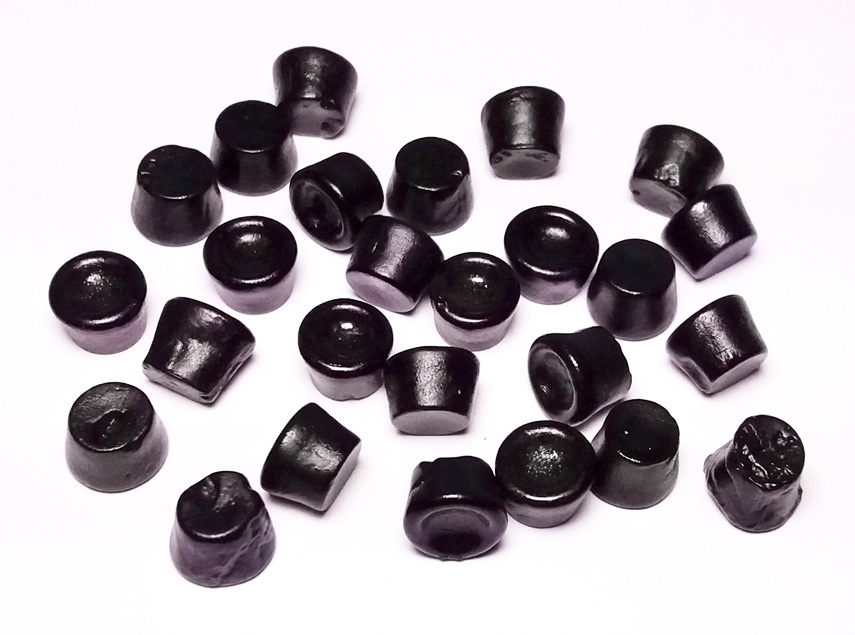
Sugarfree salmiakki candies by Pirkka. Sweetened with maltitol and aspartame

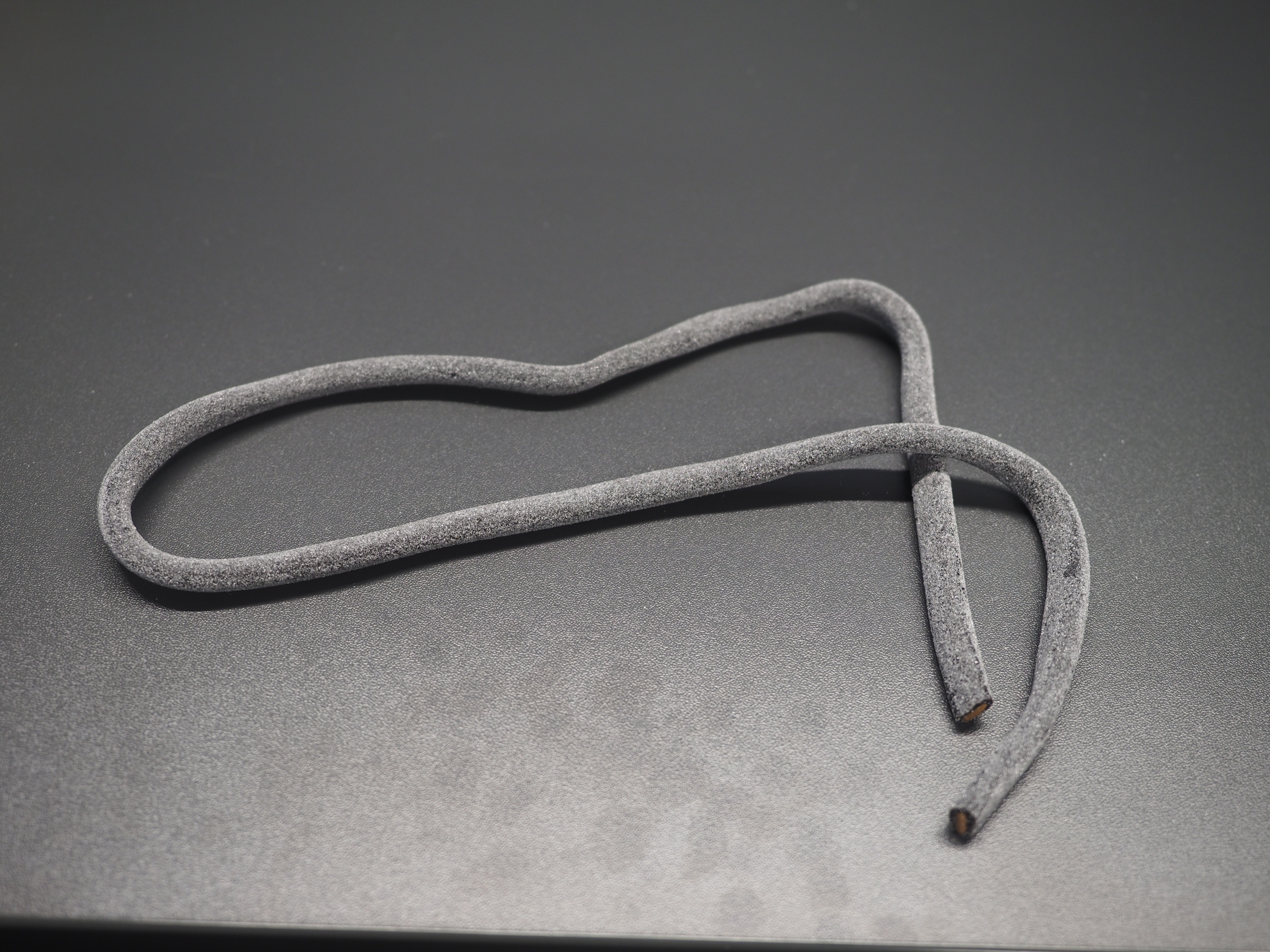
"Noitapilli" (Finnish for "Hexes' Whistle")

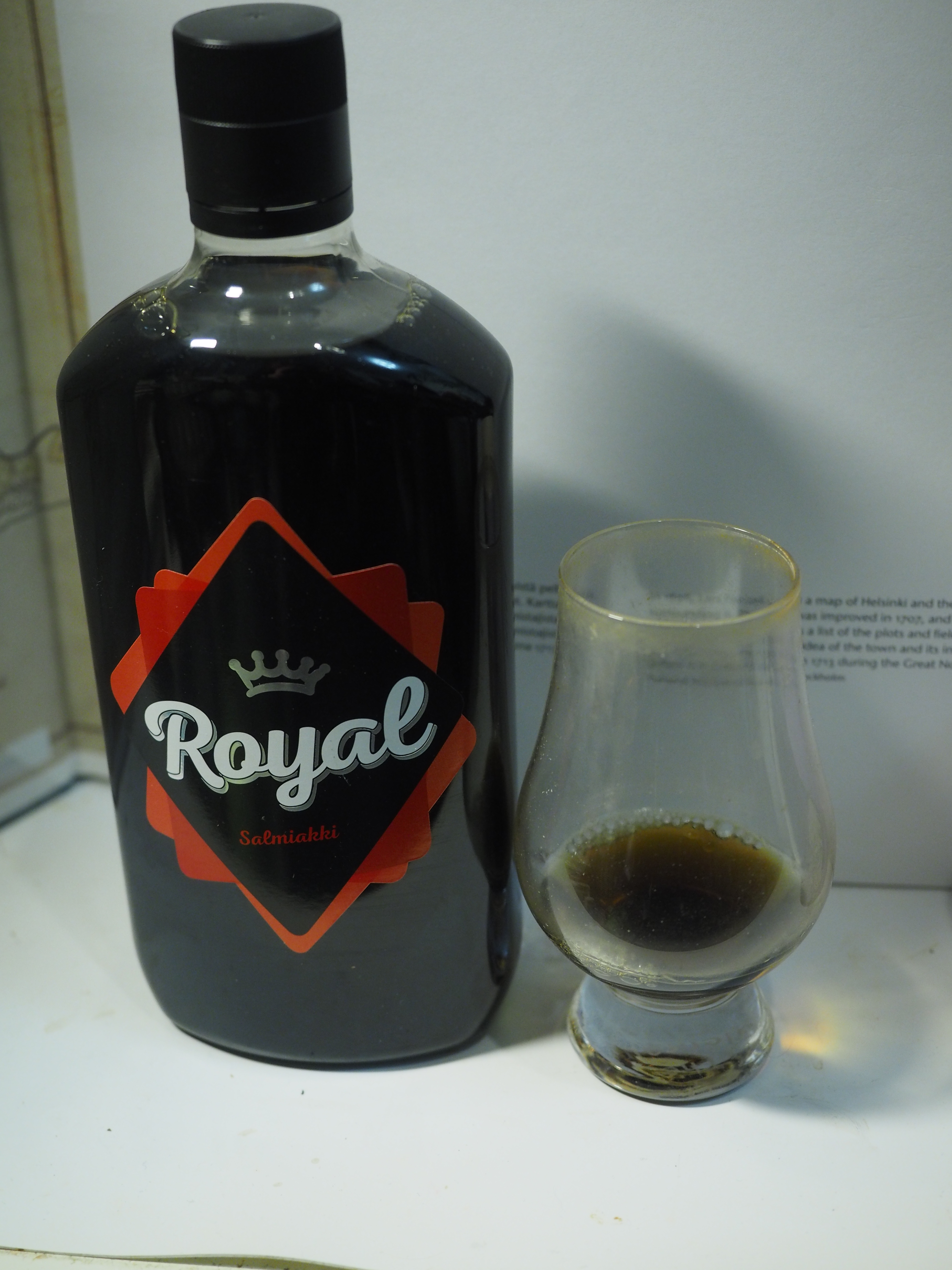
Royal Salmiakki, a salty liquorice flavoured liqueur

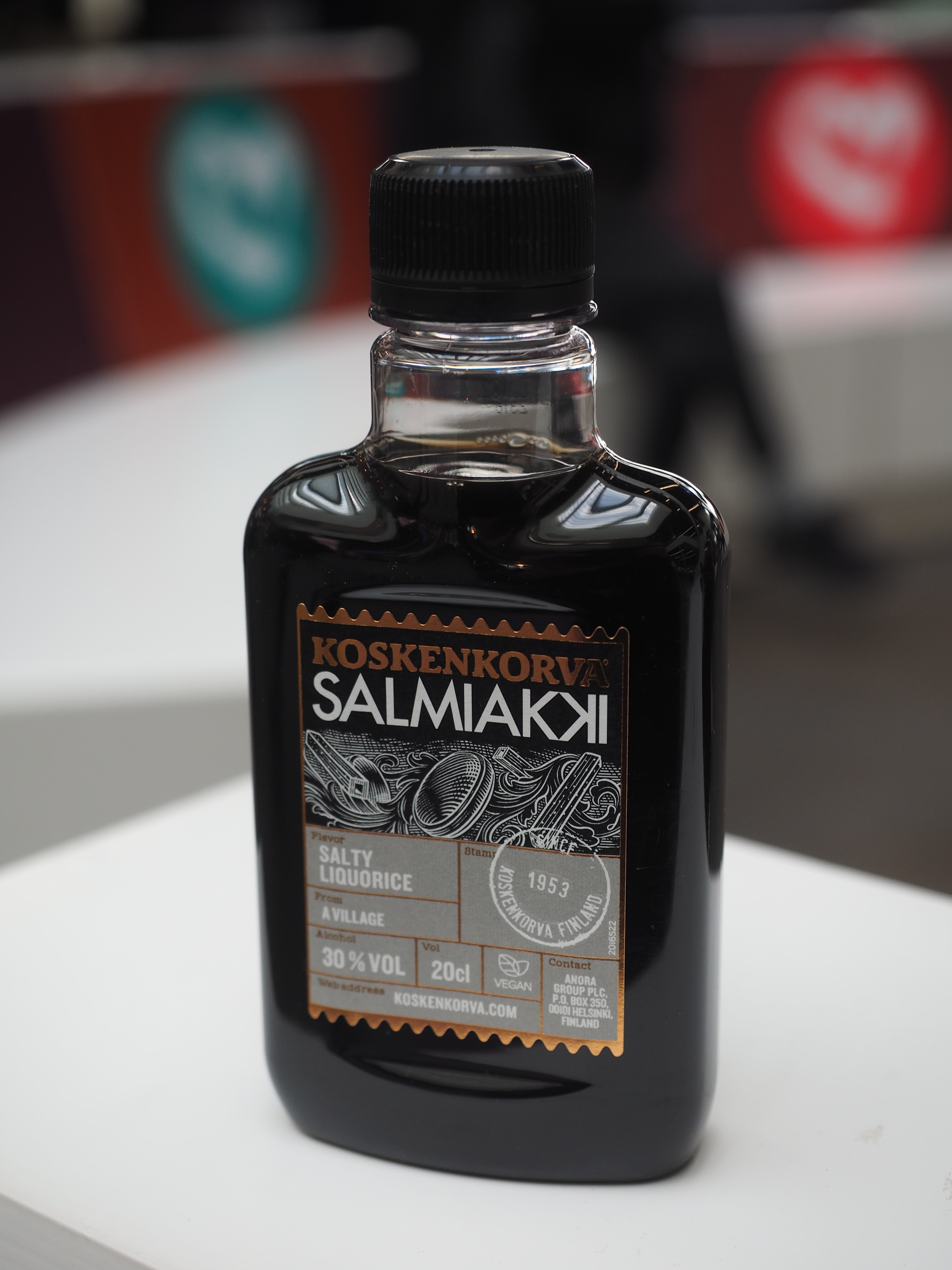
Salmiakki Koskenkorva

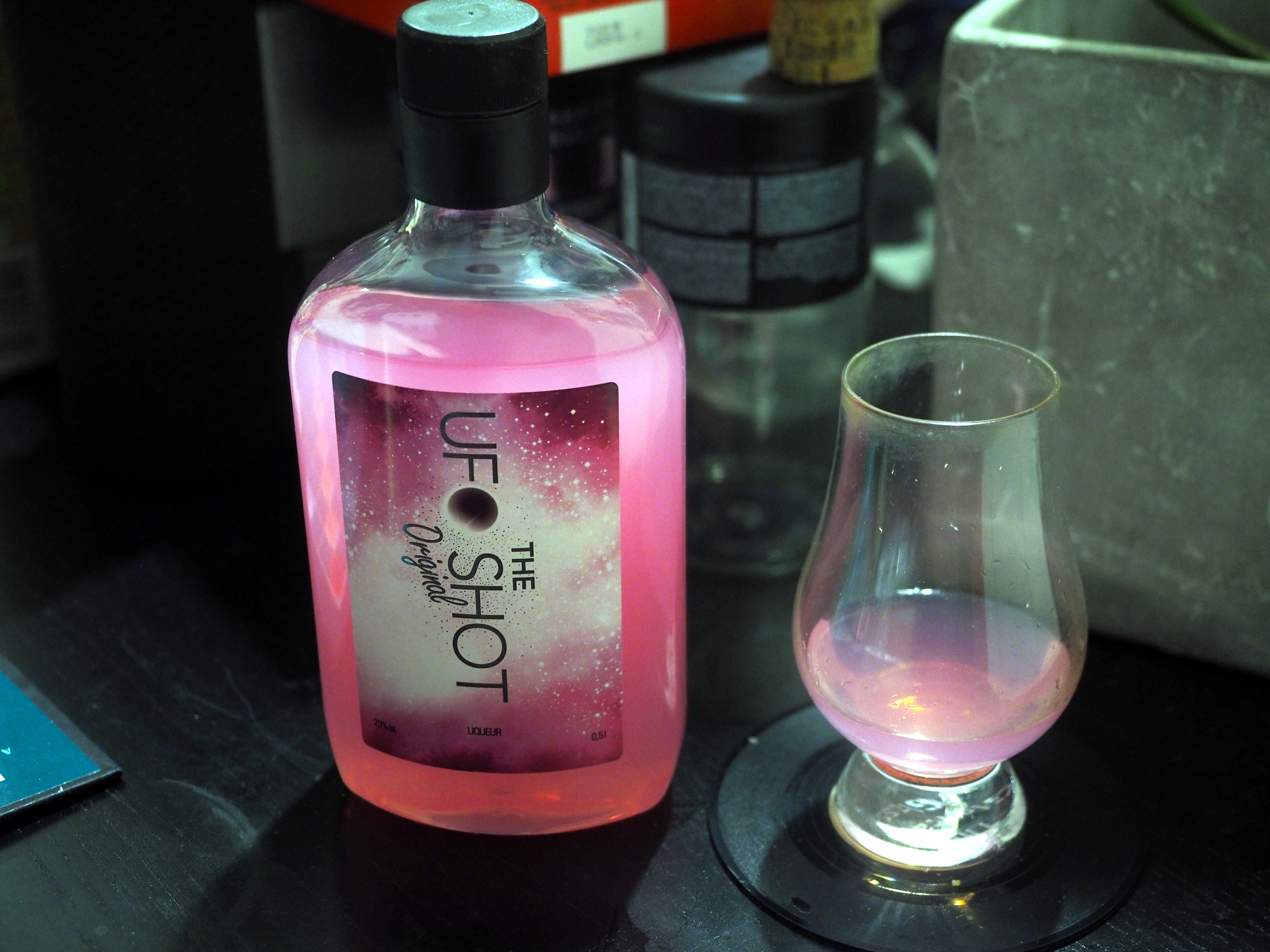
"The UFO Shot" is a berry liqueur flavoured with salmiak

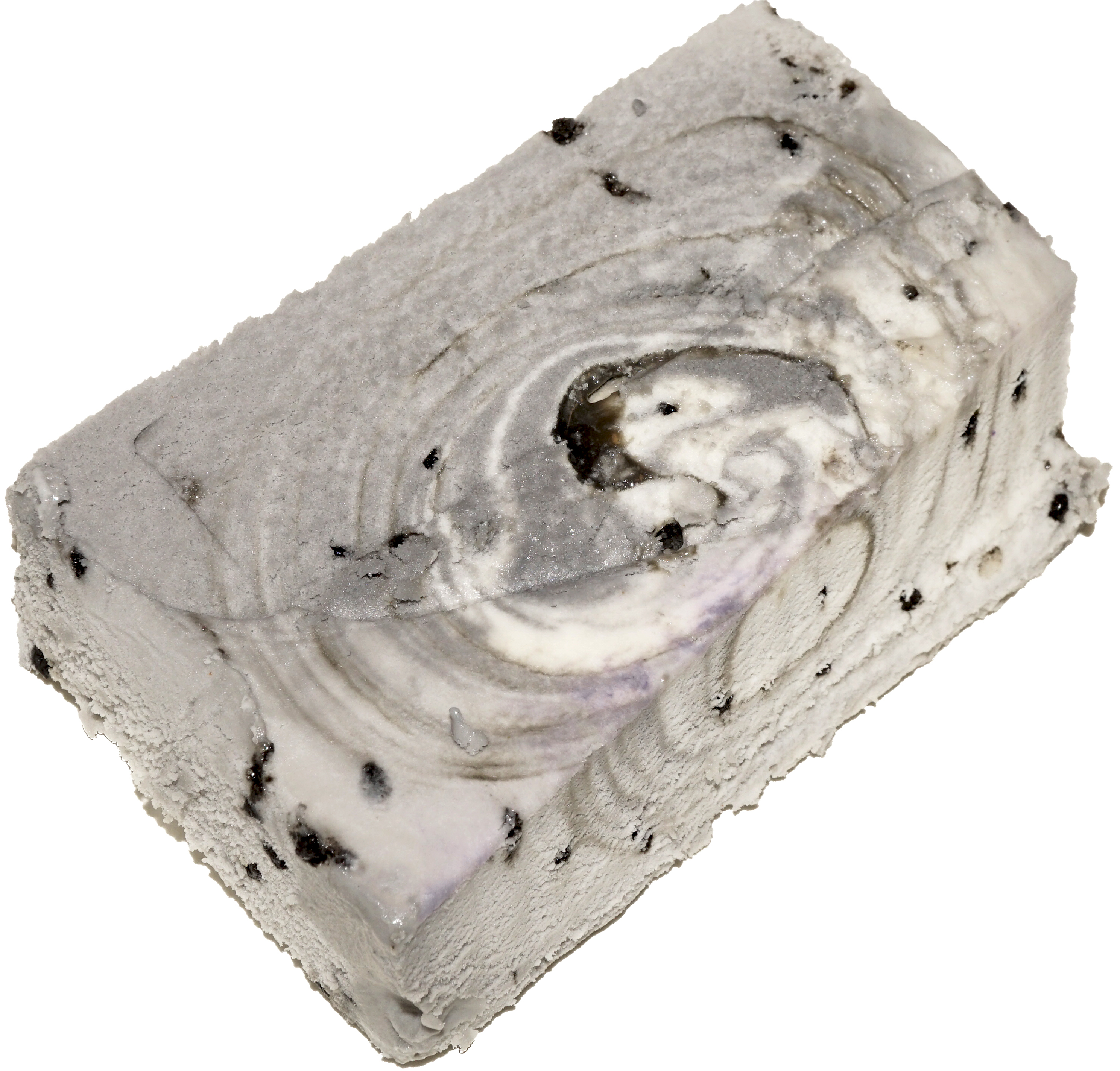
Salmiakki ice cream

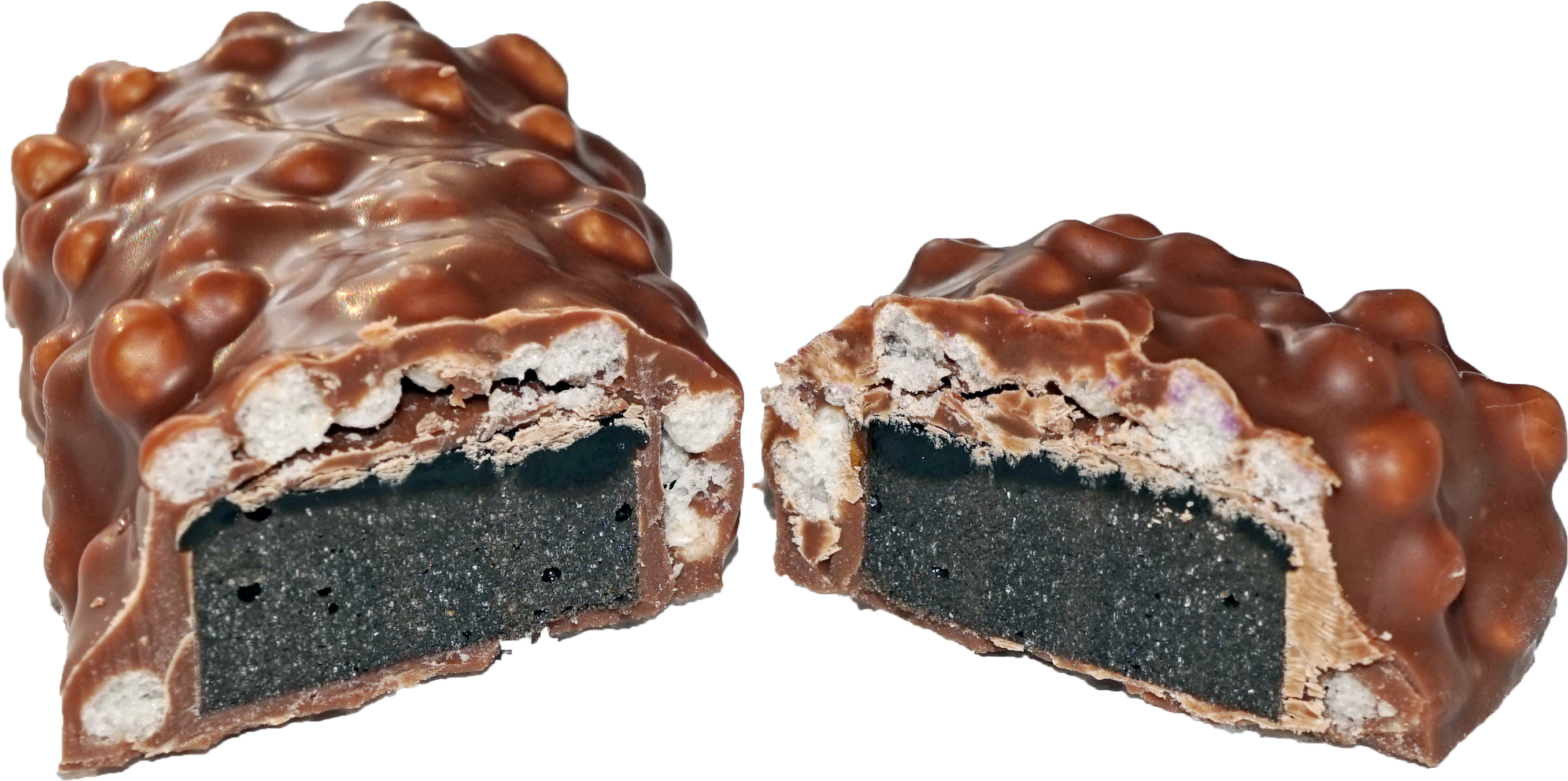
Salmiakki filled Tupla (chocolate bar)

Salmari is a Finnish salmiak liquor
