= Sugarelly =

British soft drink

Sugarelly, Spanish water, or liquorice water, is a traditional British soft drink made with liquorice that was popular in Scotland in the early to mid-20th century.

It could not usually be bought as such, but instead was prepared by leaving several strands of liquorice to diffuse in water for a period of time before drinking. This tradition seems to have been well known throughout Britain. It is mentioned in many of Richmal Crompton's "William" series, Pip makes it in his room in Great Expectations and the Scottish cartoon "Oor Wullie" also makes mention of it. Napoleon Bonaparte was known to enjoy liquorice water, as he reportedly believed it helped with his digestion.

Traditionally, this drink was made with "chemist's liquorice", a hard, black liquorice stick cut into sections and dropped into a bottle of cold water. This was left in a cool, dark place for a week or so. Once infused, the liquorice water could be enjoyed by shaking the bottle and sucking the brown foam from its neck.

In a 1959 letter to a fan, Richmal Crompton gives her recipe for liquorice water — "We bought strings of liquorice at a chemists', chopped them up & put them in a bottle of water, shook it till they melted. I've forgotten what it tasted like but it sounds horrible!"
