= Tyrkisk peber =

Finnish liquorice candy

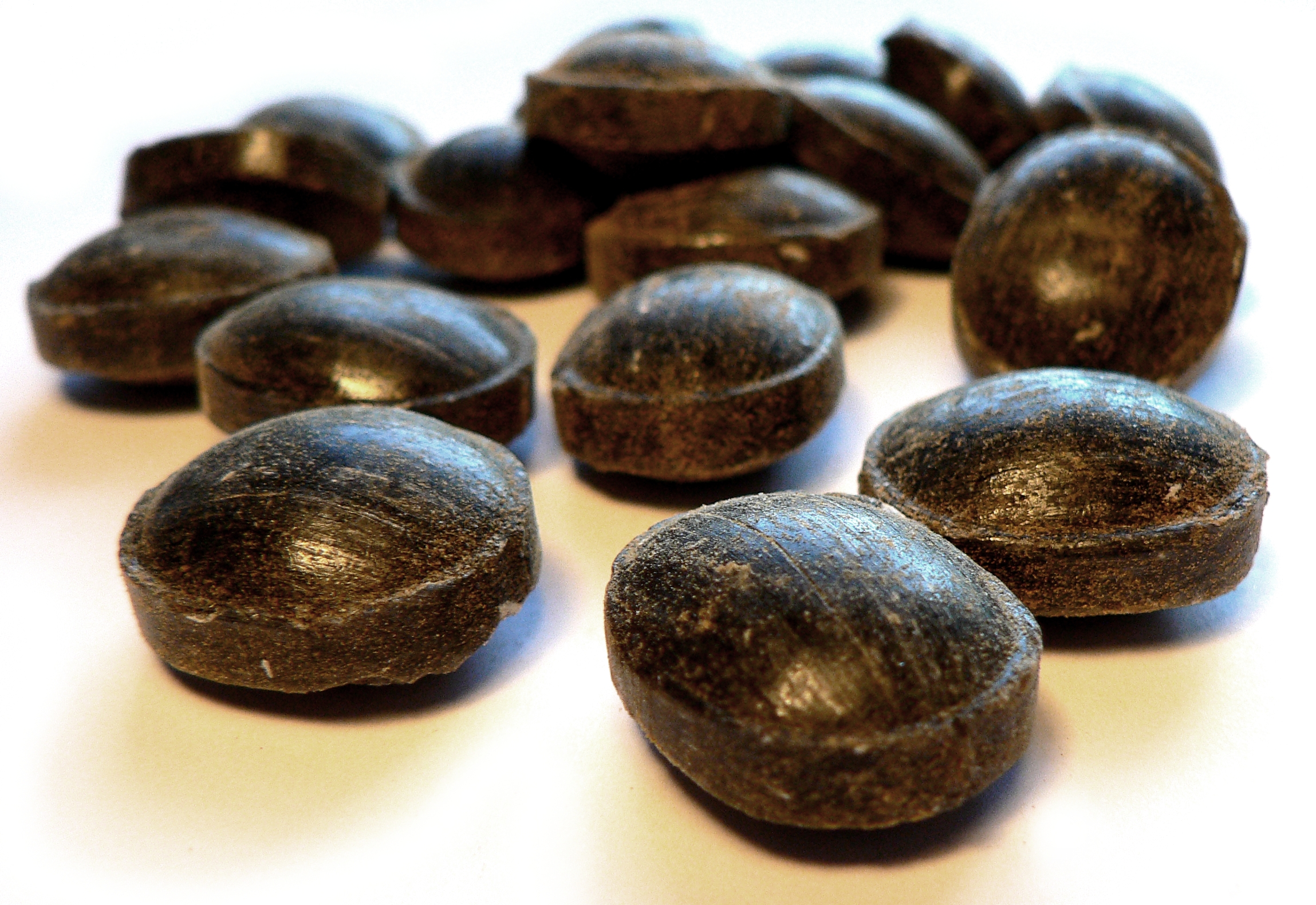
- Classic tyrkisk peber sweets
- Alternative names: Turkinpippuri; Türkisch Pfeffer; Tyrkisk pepper Turkisk peppar
- Type: Salty liquorice hard candy
- Region or state: Nordic region
- Associated cuisine: Danish cuisine Finnish cuisine
- Invented: 1976; 50 years ago
- Main ingredients: sugar, liquorice, salmiac

Tyrkisk peber (Danish for "Turkish pepper", often referred to as Turkinpippuri in Finnish, Türkisch Pfeffer in German, Tyrkisk pepper in Norwegian and Turkisk peppar in Swedish) is a brand of salty liquorice candy flavoured with salmiac, popular in Northern Europe.

The brand was first launched in 1977 by the Danish company Perelly, but was acquired by the Finnish company Fazer in 1996. Although other similar sweets are commercially available, the name Tyrkisk peber is a brand name to which Fazer has the exclusive rights.

== History ==
The name tyrkisk peber (lit. 'Turkish pepper') was historically used in Denmark and Norway to refer to Capsicum annuum, which was used medicinally.

The sweet was invented by Per Fjelsten in 1976 in Jutland. Tyrkisk peber were first commercially sold in 1977 by Perelly, a Danish company which had been founded as Støvring Bolcher in 1946. The candy quickly became one of their best selling products and was partially acquired by Fazer in the mid 1980s. Fazer eventually purchased the entire company, and moved production from Denmark to Finland in the 1990s. Under Fazer's control, the brand expanded internationally and variations of the sweet were introduced.

== Description ==
The main ingredients of the candy are liquorice, ammonium chloride (typically referred to as salmiac, and chilli. (pepper, originally) It was originally hygroscopic, and if left in an unsealed bag it would absorb water from the air and stick together after a few days. In recent years, the recipe was changed to remove the hygroscopic nature, as well as replacing the pepper with chilli.

The original version of the sweet is a large, hollow, round shell both coated and filled with ammonium chloride powder. It is sold in dark blue, flame-decorated bags. The bags have a flaming-star rating system to differentiate between spicier and milder varieties. Fazer has produced special challenge varieties of Tyrkisk Peber made with chili extract rated 900 000 on the Scoville scale.

== Variations ==
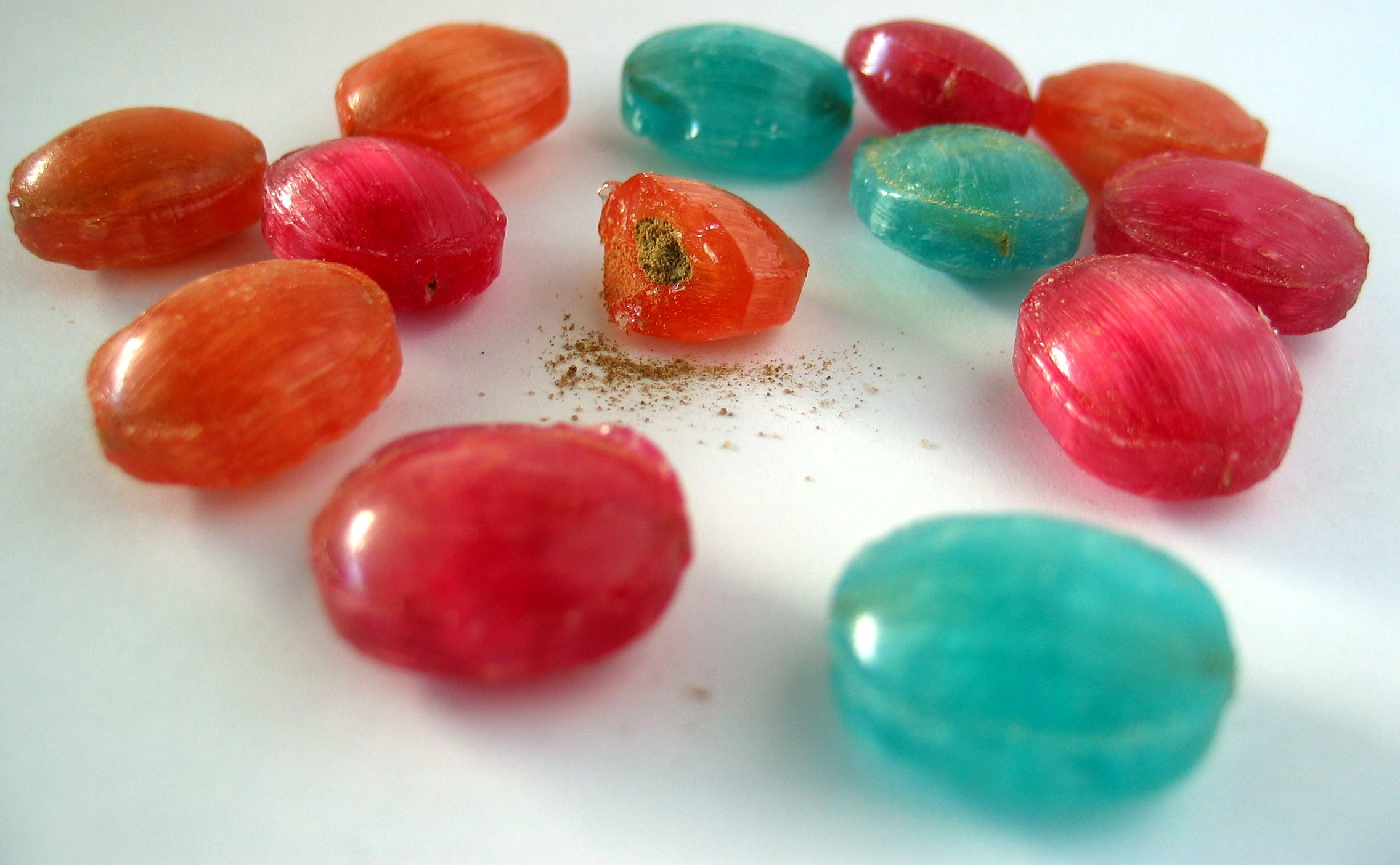
Tyrkisk peber come in varying flavours

The tyrkisk peber product family has later expanded to include the "Hot & Sour" (a milder variant of the traditional design, produced in four different flavours; Spicy Citrus, Pepper Liquorice, Chilli Melon and Strawberry Surprise) and "Bonfire" (soft, much milder candies) bagged variants, as well as lollipops and filled liquorice. There has also been a chili-flavoured version and a strongly licorice-flavoured version with less of the ammonium chloride and peppercorn flavouring, but these have since been discontinued. However, the licorice-flavoured variant can still be found as one of the flavours in the "Hot & Sour" bags. In Northern Europe there are competing different versions of salmiac-based candy, including pulverpadder (frog shaped candies), rustne søm and spejderhagl.

Tyrkisk peber is used to make the Finnish candy shot Salmiakki Koskenkorva and in similar Scandinavian drinks. When Perelly manufactured tyrkisk peber, it was also available as powder which was often used to make a drink known in Denmark as sorte svin, små grå, hot shot or lakridsshot, in Sweden as lakritsshot, and in Norway as tyrker, små grå or lakrisshot.

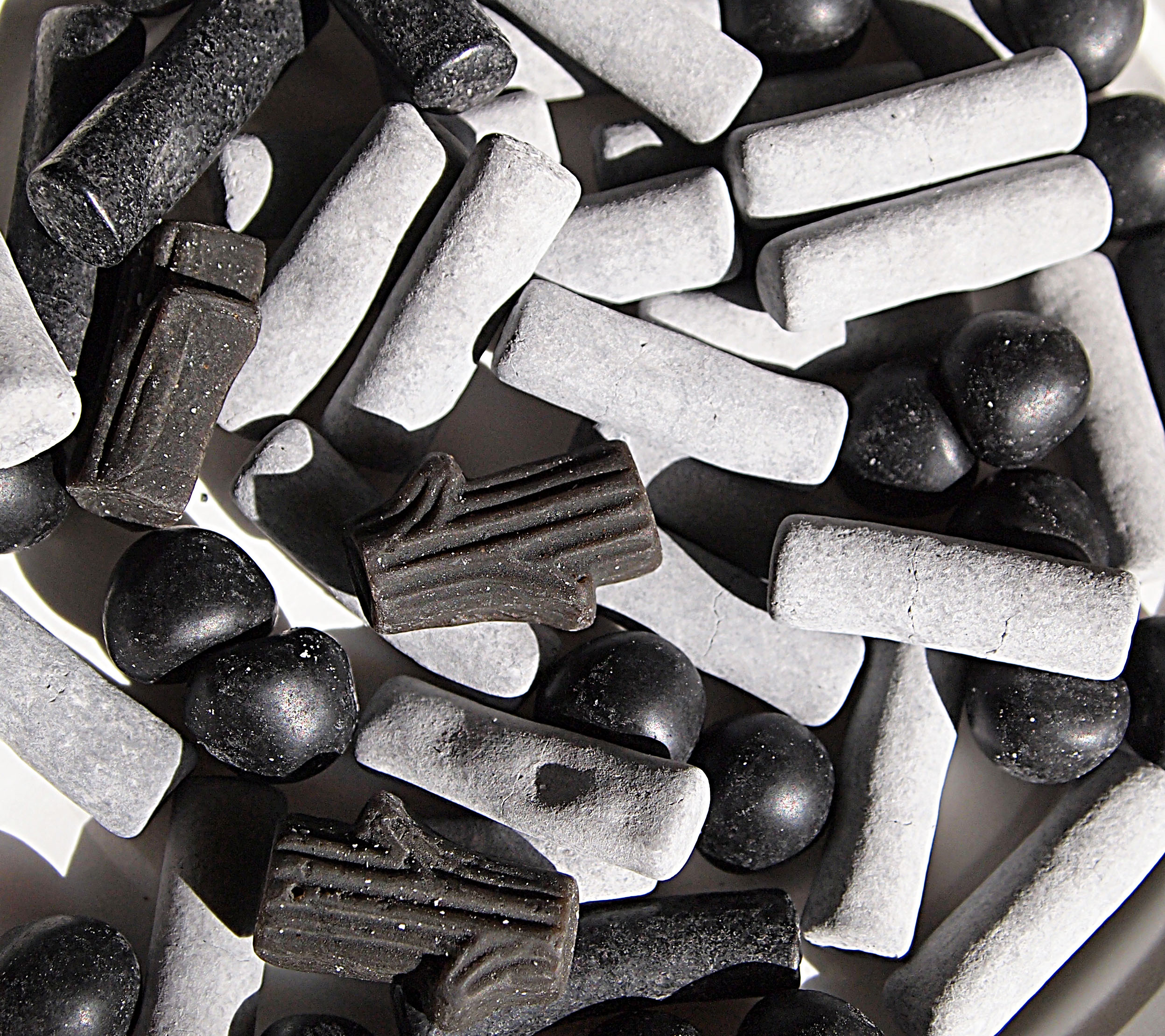
Firewood shaped tyrkisk peber

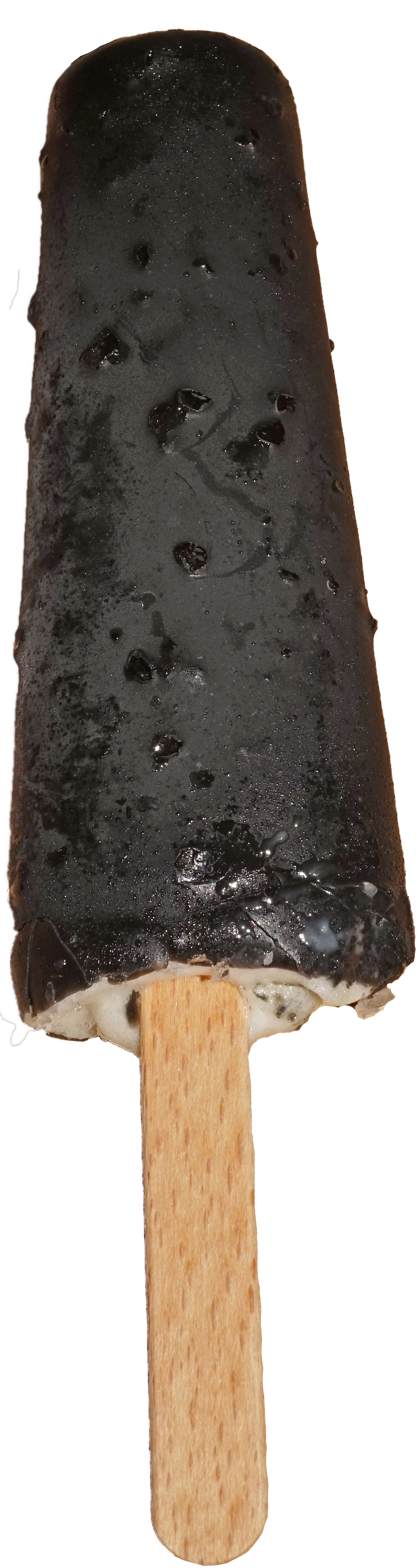
Tyrkisk peber ice cream

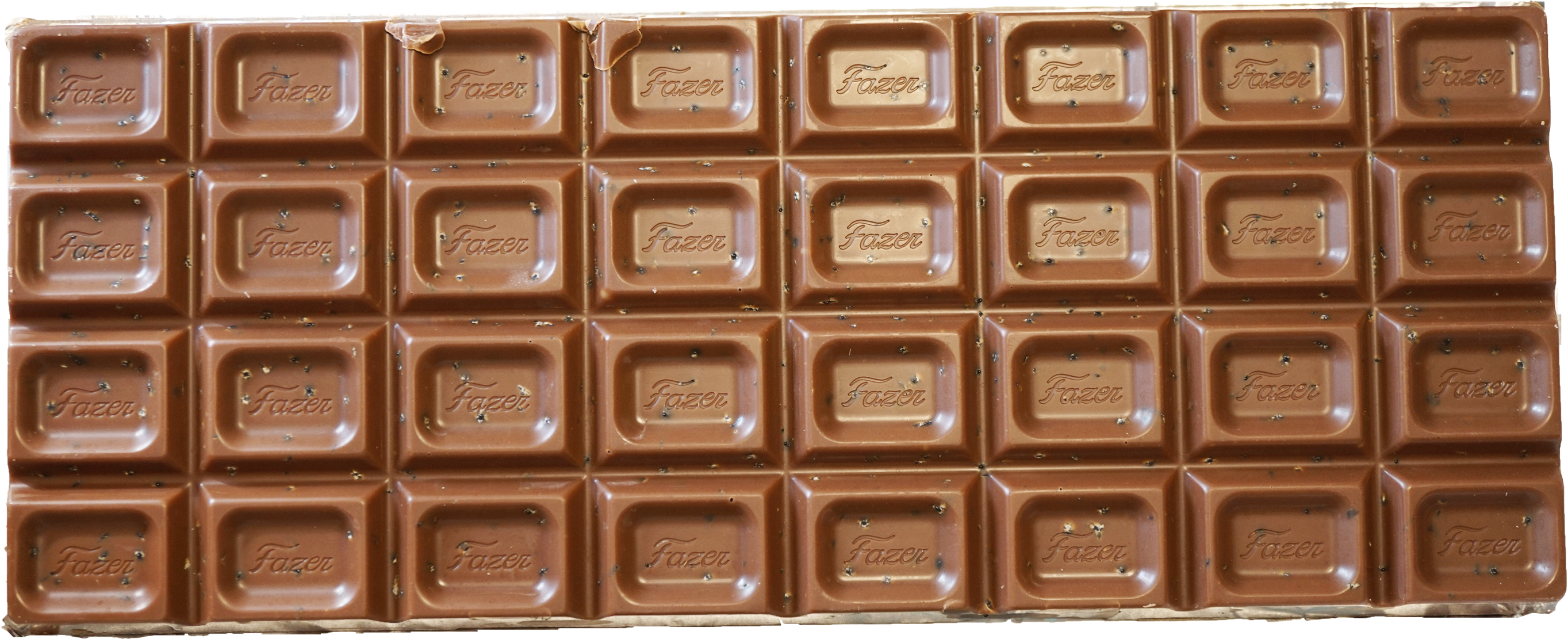
Tyrkisk Peber flavoured chocolate
