= Mignon (disambiguation) =

Mignon is an 1866 opera by Ambroise Thomas, based on Goethe's Wilhelm Meister's Apprenticeship.

Mignon (French for "cute" or "kind") may also refer to:

== Arts and entertainment ==
- Mignon, a fictional character in Goethe's novels Wilhelm Meister's Apprenticeship and Wilhelm Meister's Journeyman Years
  - Mignon (Schubert), the Goethe character and the subject of several lieder by Schubert
- the title character of Modeste Mignon, an 1844 novel by Honoré de Balzac
- Mignon, a 1962 novel by James M. Cain
- Mignon (1915 film), an American film based on the opera
- Mignon (1922 film), a German film based on Wilhelm Meister's Apprenticeship
- the title character of Mignon Has Come to Stay, a 1988 Italian film

== Places ==
- Mignon, Alabama, a census-designated place in the United States
- Canal du Mignon, a canal in western France
- Mignon (river), a tributary of the Sèvre Niortaise in Deux-Sèvres, Poitou, France
- Mignon Point, a headland on the south side of the entrance to Belize Inlet, British Columbia, Canada

== People ==
- Mignon (name), a list of people with the given name or surname
- Mignon (musician), 21st-century German punk rock musician Mignon Baer
- Wily Mignon (1986–2025), Beninese singer, composer, and arranger
- Les Mignons, a term for the frivolous and fashionable young men who were favorites of King Henry III of France

== Other uses ==
- Mignon (chocolate egg), a confectionery product made by Fazer
- Mignon, a quality of the French Maroilles cheese
- Mignon battery, a common European term for an AA battery
- Rosa 'Cécile Brünner', a rose also known as Mignon

== See also ==
- Filet mignon, a tender cut of beef
- Welte-Mignon, a former manufacturer of orchestrions, organs and reproducing pianos
- Minion (disambiguation)
- Mignonne (disambiguation)
