= Minion =

Minion or Minions may refer to:

== Places ==
- Minions, Cornwall, a village in the UK

== People ==
- Frank Minion (born 1929), American jazz and bop singer
- Fred Minion, English professional footballer
- Joseph Minion (born 1957), American film director and screenwriter
- Marcus Fernaldi Gideon and Kevin Sanjaya Sukamuljo, Indonesian badminton men's doubles pair often called "the Minions"

== Arts, entertainment, and media ==
=== Fictional characters ===
- Minion, the title character's best friend from the animated film Megamind
- Minion, a character and vehicle from the video game series Twisted Metal
- Minions, Blair Waldorf's followers at Constance Billard School in the television show Gossip Girl
- Minions, the creatures controlled by the player character in Overlord
- Alexander Minion, a character from the movie Spy Kids
- Maelstrom's Minions, Marvel Comics supervillains Gronk, Helio, and Phobius that work for Maelstrom
- Minions (Despicable Me), characters from the Despicable Me franchise

=== Films ===
- Minions (film), a 2015 animated film based on the creatures from the Despicable Me franchise
- Minions: The Rise of Gru, a 2022 animated film based on the creatures from the Despicable Me franchise
- Minions & Monsters, a 2026 animated film based on the creatures from the Despicable Me franchise
- The Minion, a 1998 American and Canadian action supernatural horror film directed by Jean-Marc Piché

=== Games ===
- Minions (video game), a 2008 Flash game featured on the Casual Collective website
- Overlord: Minions, a 2009 puzzle video game for the Nintendo DS

== Technology ==
- Minion (cannon), a type of cannon with a small bore during the 16th and 17th centuries
- Minion (chat widget), which runs in web browsers
- Minion (solver), constraint solver
- MinION, a nanopore DNA sequencing platform developed by Oxford Nanopore Technologies

== Other uses ==
- Minion (typeface), designed by Robert Slimbach in 1990 for Adobe Systems
- Minion (typography), a type size between nonpareil and brevier
- Minion (ship), a 16th century English privateering vessel

== See also ==
- Henchman
- Mignon (disambiguation)
- Minnion (disambiguation)
- Minyan, a quorum of Jewish worshippers
