= Geisha (disambiguation) =

Geisha are traditional Japanese female entertainers.

Geisha may also refer to:

== Film and theatre ==
- The Geisha, an 1896 British musical
- The Geisha (1914 film), an American short silent film using music from the musical
- A Geisha, a 1953 Japanese film
- The Geisha (1983 film), a Japanese film
- Memoirs of a Geisha (film), a 2005 Steven Spielberg film

== Other uses ==
- Geisha (band), an Australian rock band
- Geisha (coffee), an Ethiopian coffee variety
- Geisha (chocolate), hazelnut-filled milk chocolate made by Fazer
- Geisha (planthopper), a genus of hemipteran insects, found in East Asia.
- Geisha (video game), a 1990 adventure video game
- Geisha Handicap, an American horse race
- Geisha Williams (born 1961/62), Cuban American businesswoman
- Geisha: A Life, a 2002 autobiography by Mineko Iwasaki
- "Geisha (The Tokyo VIP)", a song by Ghastly from The Mystifying Oracle, 2018
- 1047 Geisha, a main-belt asteroid
- Ulmus parvifolia 'Geisha', a Chinese Elm cultivar
- The Lady, the main antagonist of Little Nightmares, sometimes referred to as “The Geisha” by fans
