= Vihreät kuulat =

Marmalade candy

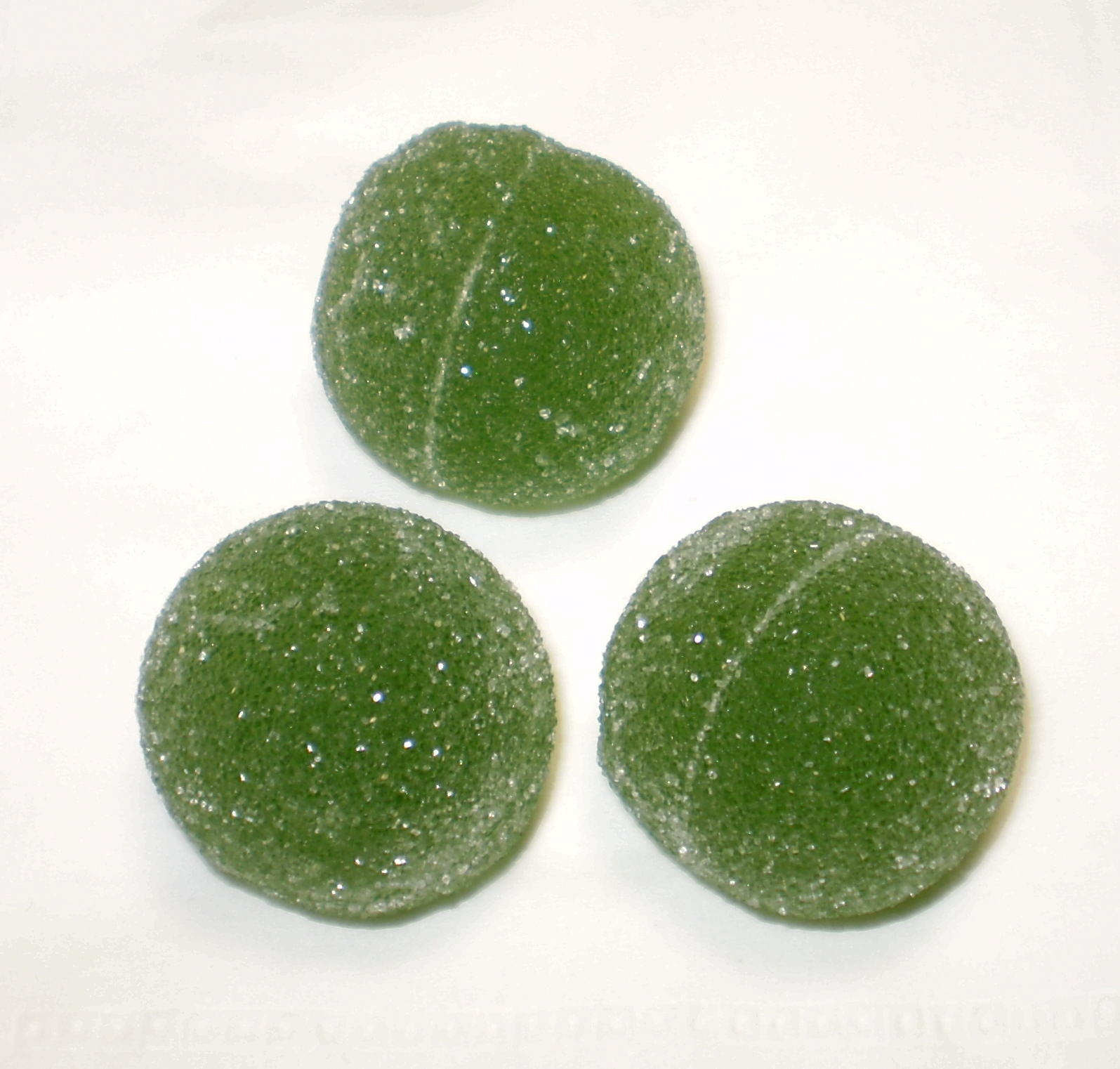
- Three pieces of Vihreät kuulat candy
- Type: Gummy candy
- Place of origin: Finland
- Created by: Fazer
- Invented: 1929

Vihreät kuulat (Finnish for 'green marbles') is a brand of pear-flavoured gummy candies (known as marmalade in Finland) produced by Fazer, sold in boxes and as loose candy. The Finlandia candy selection includes spheres of other colours as well.

Karl Fazer brought the recipe and makers of the gummy candy from St. Petersburg and they have been produced since the late 19th century. Colourful gummy spheres were originally produced already in 1902 for the coronation of king Edward VII of the United Kingdom. The name "Kruunajaismarmeladi" ("coronation marmalade") was changed into Finlandia in 1948.

In 1929 production of Vihreät kuulat started in Helsinki at the factory at Tehtaankatu 29. Production moved to Fazerila in Vantaa (known as Helsingin maalaiskunta at the time) in 1960. A new factory was built in Ranua from 1987 to 1988, where production of Vihreät kuulat moved to. Production moved from Ranua to Lappeenranta in 1999 and production of Vihreät kuulat started in Lappeenranta in 2000.

The spheres were pressed together from two hemispheres by hand at the Ranua factory. At the new Lappeenranta factory the hemispheres are automatically pressed together by machine and they are moved to a sugaring drum. The spheres are still picked up and packaged by hand, one at a time.

The annual production of the candy is 25 million pieces, of which 17 million are eaten at Christmas.

In 2017 Fazer brought Jaffa Cakes flavoured with Vihreät kuulat gummy candies onto the market. In spring 2018 Fazer announced it would discontinue this variation. During the eight months the variation was produced, the production had reached 1.4 million packages.
