= Ernest Pingoud =

Finnish composer (1887–1942)

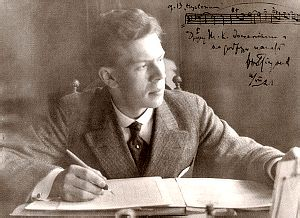

Ernest Pingoud (Finnish pronunciation: [pɛ̃ˈgu]; 14 October 1887 – 1 June 1942) was a Finnish composer and music critic born in Saint Petersburg.

== Life ==
Pingoud was born to a father of French Huguenot ancestry and a German-Finnish mother. His father Guido Pingoud was the pastor of the German Lutheran parish of Saint Catherine in Saint Petersburg, and his mother belonged to the Finland-Swedish Sesemann family, related to the Melartin family. In Saint Petersburg, Pingoud studied music privately with the pianist Alexander Siloti and at the Saint Petersburg Conservatory under Alexander Glazunov and Nikolai Rimsky-Korsakov. Siloti had come to know the family when he became a neighbour of their summer residence at Tikkala Manor near Viipuri.

In 1906, Pingoud went to Germany to study with the music theorist Hugo Riemann and the composer Max Reger, who considered him one of his best pupils. He also studied non-musical subjects, including geology, philosophy and literature, at Jena, Munich, Bonn and Berlin, with German literature as his main subject. He wrote a doctoral thesis on the young Goethe and Romanticism, but it was not approved because new sources that emerged at the same time undermined the material in the thesis. In 1908, while still a student, Pingoud began a writing career as musical correspondent for the St. Petersburger Zeitung; he held the post until 1911 and subsequently contributed concert and opera reviews from St. Petersburg until 1914.

Pingoud's ties to Finland were established during his military service in 1915 in Ostrobothnia and Björneborg, where he met his future wife. They married in 1918 and lived in Viipuri until 1922. After the revolution, Pingoud settled in Finland, where he worked at Fazer's concert agency in 1924–1931 and 1935–1937, and served from 1924 as intendant of the Helsinki Philharmonic Orchestra, a post he held until his death in 1942.

His first orchestral concert, held in Helsinki on 16 November 1918, heralded the arrival of a modernist musical aesthetic in Finland. The programme included La dernière aventure de Pierrot, Piano Concerto No. 1 and Danse macabre, works influenced by Richard Strauss, Alexander Scriabin and Claude Debussy that were the most daring music yet performed in Finland. Critics labelled Pingoud a futurist, cubist, ultra-modernist and even a "musical Bolshevik", though his command of orchestration did receive some acknowledgement. His open rejection of Finnish nationalism may have contributed to the disapproval he encountered; unlike other Finnish composers of the time, he avoided composing works inspired by the Kalevala.

Pingoud committed suicide by throwing himself under a train in Helsinki on 1 June 1942.

== Style ==
Pingoud's preferred mode of musical expression was orchestral, especially in symphonic poems following the example of Scriabin His three piano concertos seem to look more to the models of Franz Liszt and Sergei Rachmaninoff. Although the concision of his Fünf Sonette has been compared to early works of the Second Viennese School, his musical language remained predominantly tonal. He made extensive use of the Prometheus chord and the octatonic collection.

== Recordings ==
A CD containing some of Pingoud's symphonic poems has been recorded for Ondine by the Finnish Radio Symphony Orchestra, conducted by Sakari Oramo.

== Works ==
Solo Voice

- Barcarole (Venelaulu)
- Berceuse (Kehtolaulu) Op. 11a No 3
- En blomma Op. 11a No 1
- Färden i storm (Matka myrskyssä) Op. 11a No 4
- Hjärtan fjärran och hjärtan nära...
- Konvallerna
- Ninon
- På kvällen
- Serenad i Toledo (Serenadi Toledossa)
- Serenad (Serenadi)
- Tanke
- Tystnad
- Törnekronan (Piikkikruunu)
- Vattenplask Op. 11a No 2
- Återkomsten (Paluu)

Orchestral

- Prologue, op. 4
- Confessions, op. 5
- La dernière aventure de Pierrot, op. 6
- Le fétiche, op. 7
- Piano Concerto No. 1, op. 8 (1917)
- Hymne à la nuît, op. 9
- Danse macabre, op. 10
- Cinq sonettes pour l'orchestre de la chambre, op. 11
- Un chevalier sans peur et sans reproche, op. 12 (1919) Inspired by Don Quixote
- Mysterium, op. 13
- Flambeaux éteints, op. 14
- Chantecler, op. 15
- Le sacrifice, op. 17
- Symphony No. 1, op. 18 (1920)
- Symphony No. 2, op. 20 (1921)
- Le prophète, op. 21
- Piano Concerto No. 2, op. 22 (1921)
- Piano Concerto No. 3, op. 23 (1922)
- Symphony No. 3, op. 27 (1923-7)
- Cor ardens (1927)
- Narcissous (1930)
- Le chant de l'espace (1931/38)
- La flamme éternelle (1936)
- La face d'une grande ville (1936/37)
