= Mignon (chocolate egg) =

Easter confectionery made by Fazer

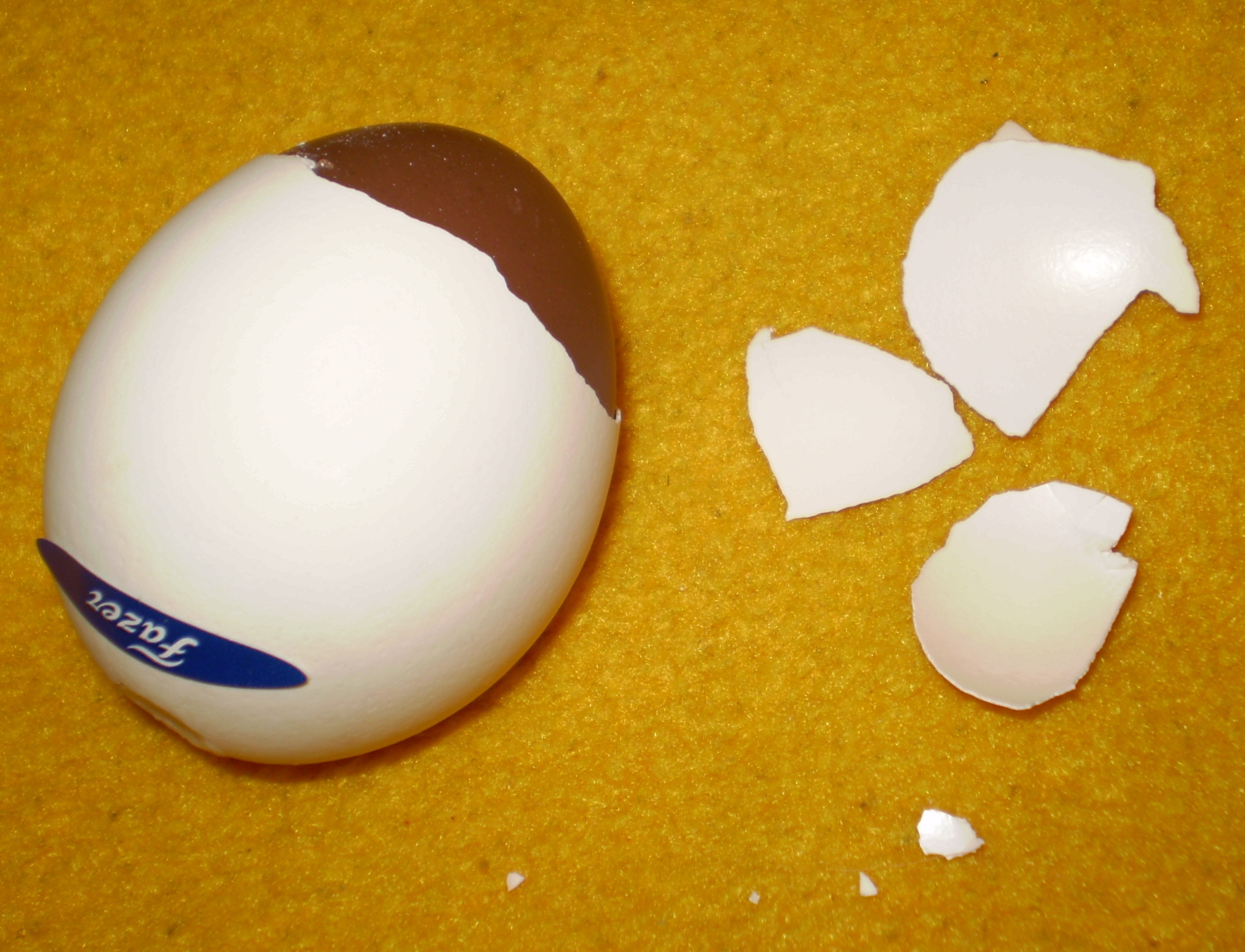
A partly shelled Mignon egg.

The Mignon chocolate egg is an Easter confectionery made by the Fazer company. Its distinctive features are a filling of almond-hazelnut nougat inside a real eggshell. The Mignon is the second oldest Fazer product (only surpassed by the Pihlaja marmalade candy), dating back to 1896, when Karl Fazer brought the idea from Germany.

With around two million eggs sold per year, Mignon eggs are a popular part of Finnish Easter celebrations. They are handmade at the Fazer factory in Vantaa.
