= Geisha Girl =

Geisha Girl may refer to:

- Geisha girl
- Geisha Girl (film), a 1952 American adventure film
- Geisha Girl (song), a 1957 song by Hank Locklin

== See also ==
- Geisha (disambiguation)
