= Minnion =

Minnion may refer to:

- Jess Minnion, fictional character in Haven
- John Minnion

== See also ==
- Minion (disambiguation)
