= Dumle =

Brand of toffees coated with chocolate

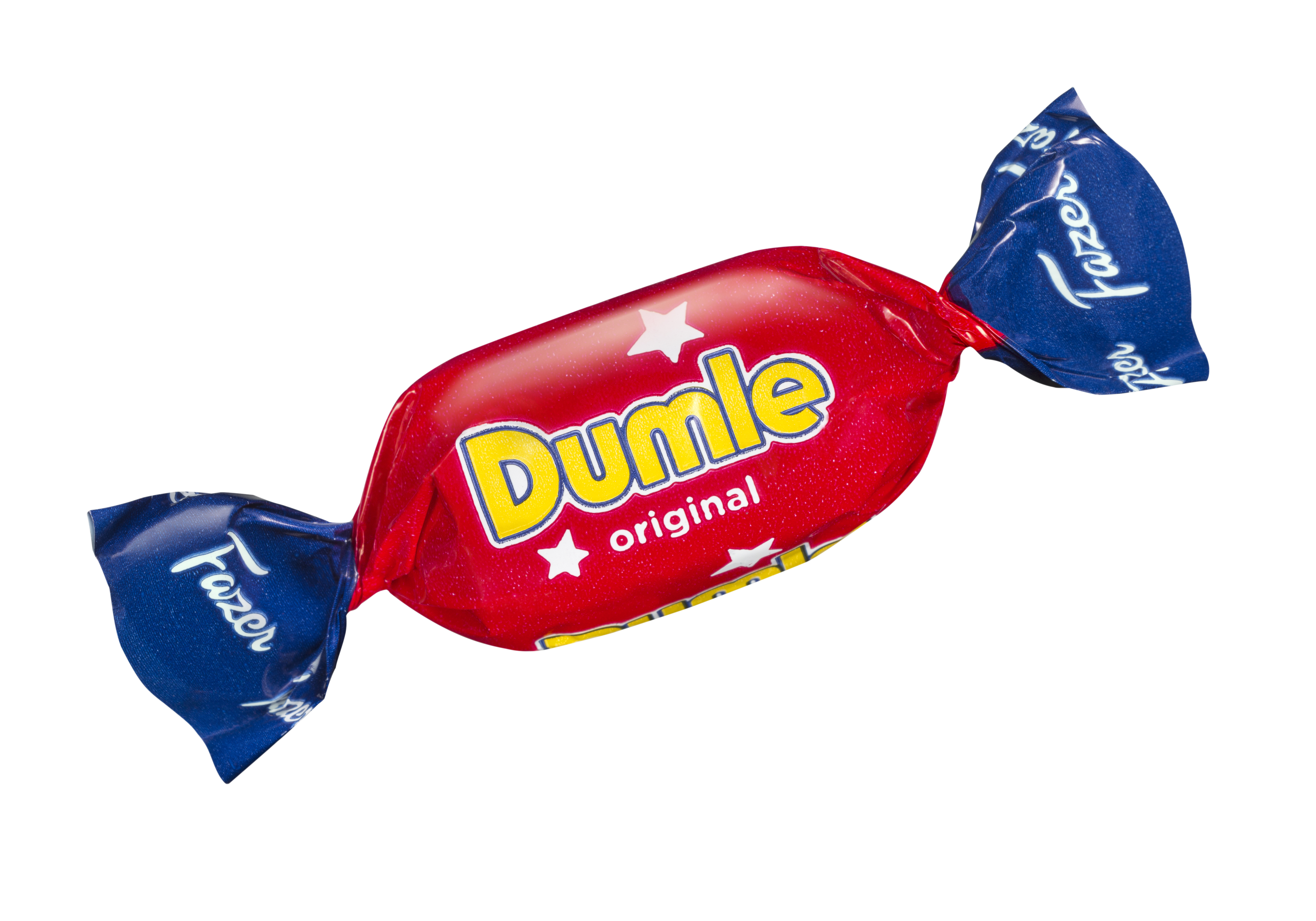
- Product type: Confectionery
- Current owner: Fazer
- Country: Sweden (1945–1975); Finland (1975–present)
- Introduced: 1945
- Markets: European Union, Norway
- Previous owners: Mazetti AB
- Website: www.fazer.com/our-brands/dumle/

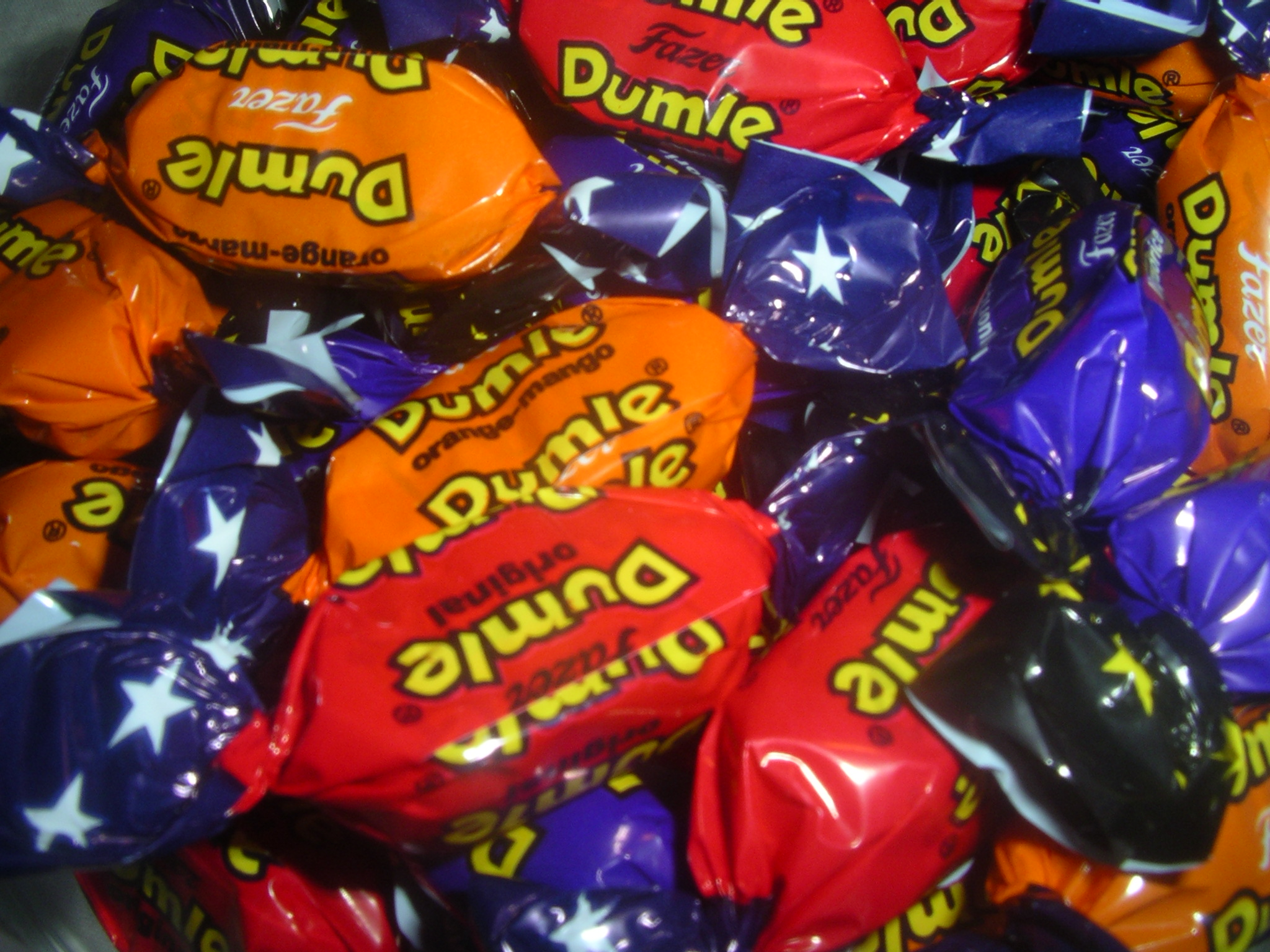
Dumle soft toffees in salty liquorice (purple wrapper), orange-mango (orange) and caramel (red) flavours.

Dumle is a Swedish brand of chocolate-covered toffees marketed and manufactured by the Finnish company Fazer.

The toffees were first manufactured in 1945 by Mazetti, a chocolate and confectionery producer in Malmö, Sweden. The original sweet consisted of a hard toffee lollipop coated in chocolate, but was not branded Dumle until 1960, possibly as a reference to children's television series Humle och Dumle, one of the first broadcast on Swedish television.

The manufacturer was acquired by Fazer in 1975, and in 1987 Fazer released a new product with a softer toffee covered in chocolate and packaged in a candy wrapper, which is now named Dumle original. They are manufactured in Vaarala, Vantaa, Finland.

The brand now contains a range of chocolate-covered caramels and toffees, including a range of chocolates and ice creams. A number of variations and limited editions have been produced, including apple, salty liquorice, mint, lemon, salted caramel, pear, brownie, gingerbread, mango-orange, cranberries, banana, lime and chocolate-flavoured soft toffees, often with distinguishing colours on their wrappers.
