= Geisha (chocolate bar) =

Chocolate bar made by the Finnish company Fazer

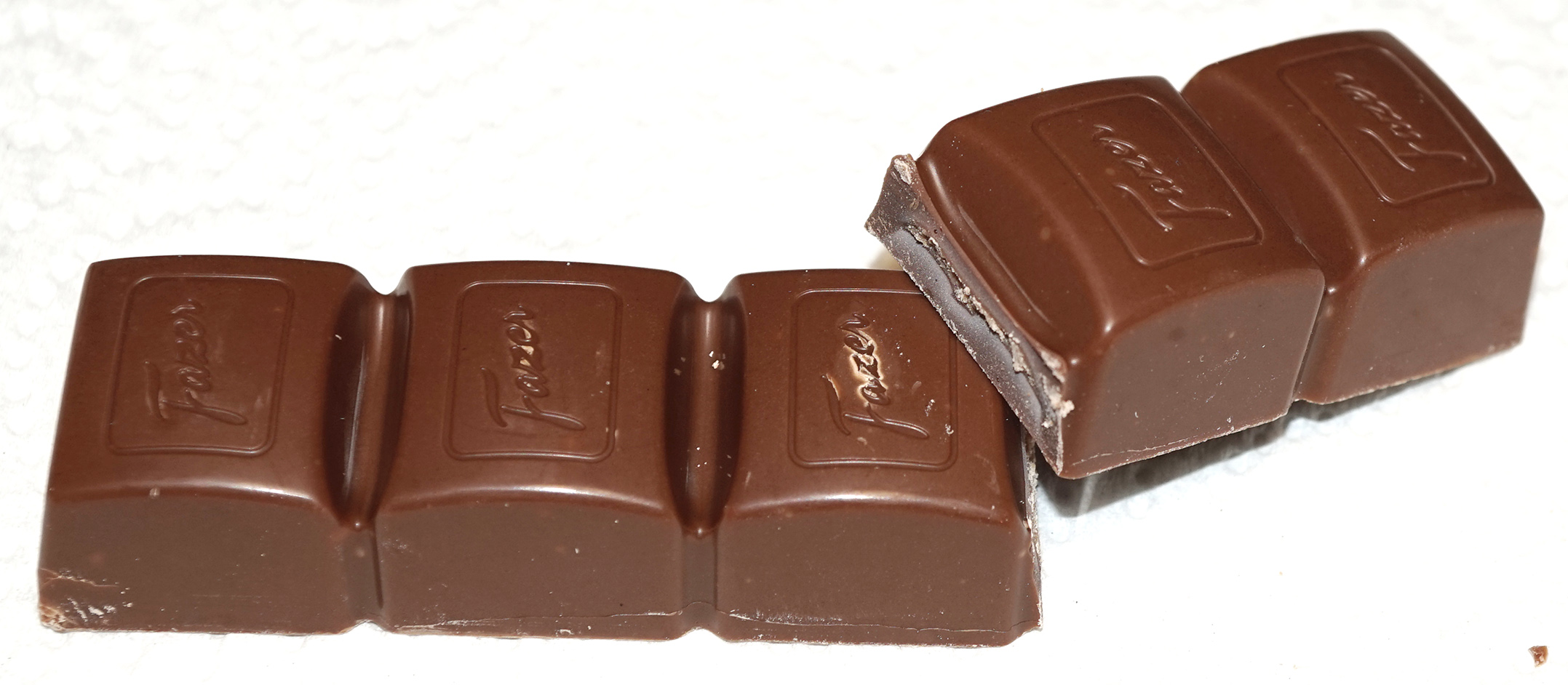
Five pieces of Geisha chocolate.

Geisha is a type of chocolate made by the Finnish company Fazer, available as a slab, a bar, or pralines. The chocolate includes Japonais hazelnut filling inside a shell of milk chocolate.

The Geisha chocolate was invented in 1962. Peter Fazer had grown to like the Japonica pastry made in the Karl Fazer Café on Kluuvikatu in Helsinki. He asked the product development department to try out this filling with milk chocolate.

The name "Geisha" and the pink colour were taken from a candy in the Fazerin Parhain ("Fazer's Best") candy bag, which was renamed Tokyo. Japan served as an inspiration to the product through the 1964 Summer Olympics in Tokyo, which Peter Fazer also competed in himself, in sailing.

In 2006 the wrapping of Geisha was altered to remove the characteristic picture of a geisha (or more accurately a maiko, a geisha-in-training) and the font was changed. In 2020 Fazer announced the company was considering renaming the product. Up to date (2025) the name remains intact.
