= Mignonne =

Mignonne or Mignonnes may refer to:

== Ships ==
- French frigate Mignonne (1767)
- French corvette Mignonne (1795)
- HMS Mignonne, three French ships, all captured by the Royal Navy

== People ==
- Mignonne Fernando, Sri Lankan singer, part of the group The Jetliners
- Mignonne Meekels (born 1986), Dutch field hockey player

== Music ==
- Mignonne (album), a 1978 album by Taeko Onuki
- Mignonne, an 1839 Lied by Richard Wagner
- "À Mignonne", a melody composed by Jules Massenet
- "Mignonne", an 1894 song by Cécile Chaminade

== Films ==
- Mignonnes (English: Cuties), a 2020 French coming-of-age drama film

== See also ==
- Suite mignonne, a 1921 composition by Jean Sibelius
- Mignon (disambiguation)
