= Edvard Fazer =

Finnish conductor and pianist (1861–1943)

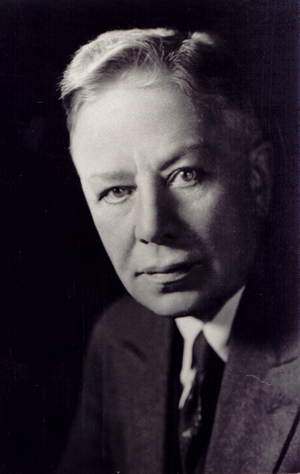
Edvard Fazer.

Edvard Alexander Fazer (29 July 1861 – 26 June 1943) was a Finnish pianist, impresario, and opera manager. His father was the Swiss-born furrier Eduard Fazer and his mother was Anna Dorothea Haunhardt. Edvard Fazer's siblings included the candymaker and wholesaler Max Fazer, the Fazer company founder Karl Fazer, the founder of the Fazer Music Shop Konrad Fazer, and the pianist Naema Fazer. Naema Fazer's spouse was the well-known German violinist Willy Burmester, who often performed in Finland.

== Career ==
Edvard Fazer studied piano performance in St.Petersburg, Vienna, Weimar, and Berlin. In Weimar, Fazer's teacher was Bernhard Stavenhagen, who had himself once been a student of Franz Liszt. Fazer initially performed as a concert accompanist both in Finland and abroad. He founded the Fazer Music Shop in Helsinki, and eventually, in 1897, he founded a concert office. Thanks to the connections he had made in his travels abroad, Fazer was able to bring many well-known artists to Helsinki by the beginning of the 20th century. Fazer was succeeded as the head of the concert office by Helge Mörck, after whose death in 1924 the music office became a part of Konrad Fazer's music store.

Fazer later set out as an impresario, and he became a central figure in the Finnish opera scene. In 1911, he founded the Helsinki Opera Stage (later the Finnish Opera), which eventually developed into the Finnish National Opera and Ballet, together with Aino Ackté. Fazer worked as the chair of the opera until 1938.

Fazer organized the Mariinsky Ballet tour, which saw performances in Helsinki, Stockholm, Copenhagen, and Berlin, between 1908 and 1910. In all there were over 70 performances during the tour.

== Literature ==
- Laakkonen, Johanna: Canon and Beyond: Edvard Fazer and the Imperial Russian Ballet 1908–1910. Väitöskirja. Helsingin yliopisto, 2008. (Tiivistelmä.)

== Additional Information ==
- Laakkonen, Johanna: / Fazer, Edvard (1861–1943). Kansallisbiografia-verkkojulkaisu (maksullinen). 19.7.2016. Helsinki: Suomalaisen Kirjallisuuden Seura.
