= Kiss-Kiss =

Finnish candy brand

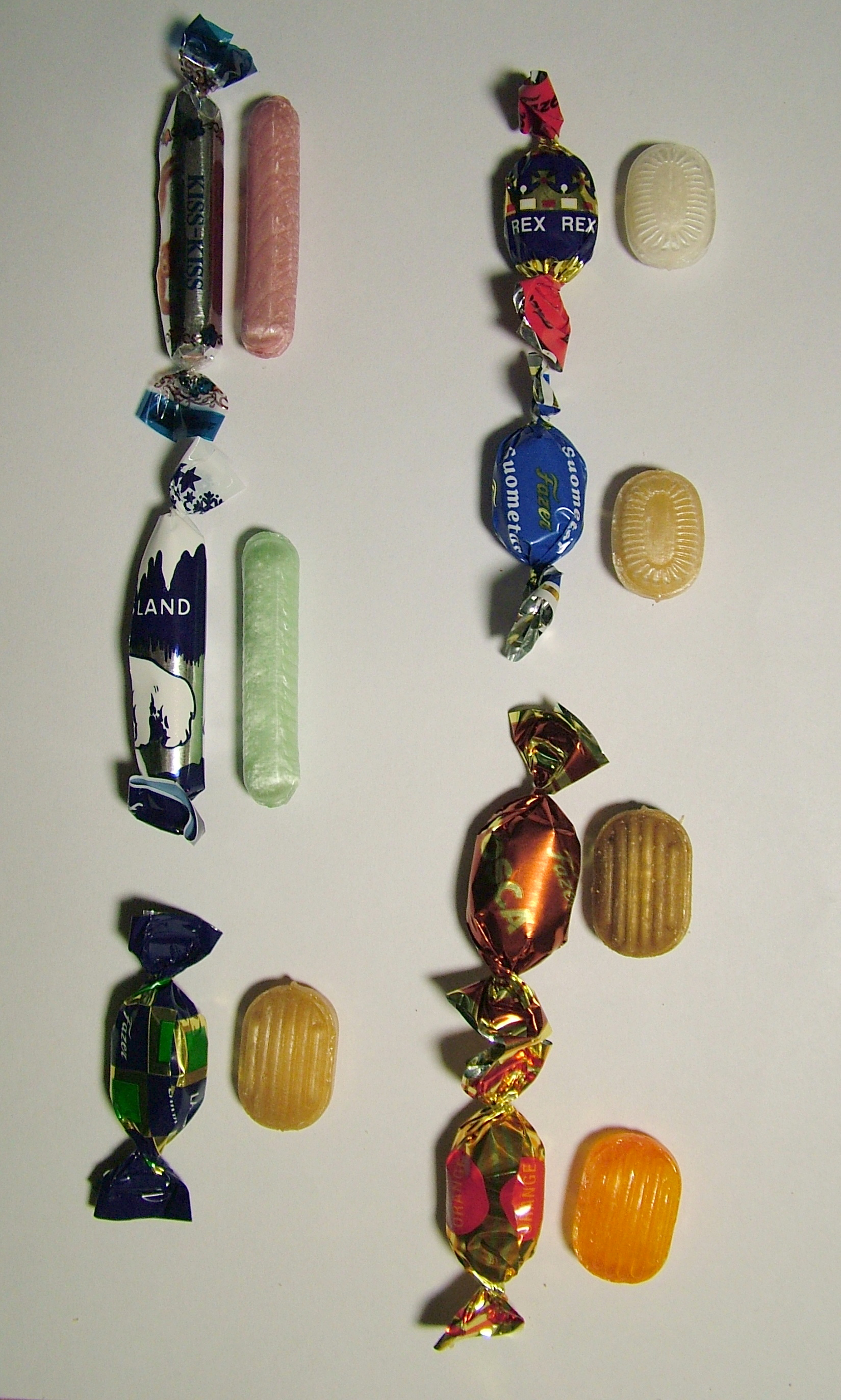
Fazerin Parhain candies, Kiss-Kiss is at the top left corner.

Kiss-Kiss is a brand of candy launched by the Finnish company Fazer in 1897. It is Fazer's third oldest brand of candy. Kiss-Kiss is currently sold at Christmas time in a separate package and all year round in the Fazerin Parhain (Fazer's Best) candy mix bag. It is oblong, pink in colour, with a soft and crunchy shell containing sticky toffee.

Kiss-Kiss candies are wrapped in a paper wrapper with pictures of cats. The candy wrapper has always featured playing kittens, and when the Finnish candy industry turned 100 years old in 1991, the cats got their own stamp. The Kiss-Kiss trademark was registered on 15 November 1901, which makes it the oldest Finnish trademark still in use in Finland.
