= Da-Capo =

Finnish chocolate bar

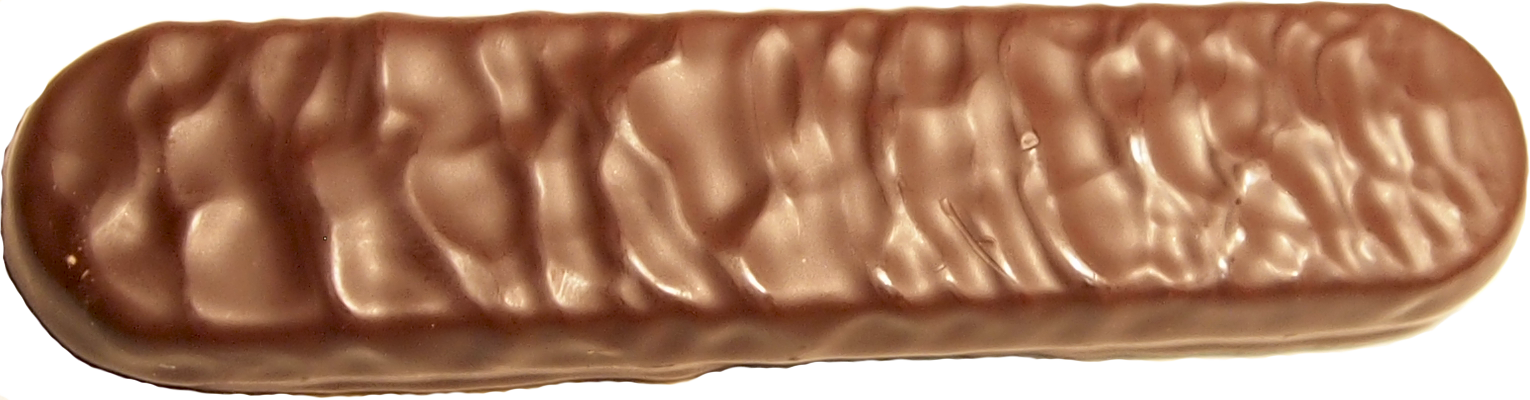
A Da-Capo chocolate bar.

Da-Capo is a chocolate bar produced by the Finnish company Fazer since 1916. Da-Capo was Fazer's first chocolate bar.

== History ==
From 1916 to 1939 Da-Capo was sold as paper-wrapped pralines. The name Da-Capo comes from the musical term da capo (redo from start), because it was invented as a recycling idea when the company wanted to reuse liqueur pralines that failed quality control. The pralines were melted down and Rhum Martinique was added to the mix, soothing the liqueur taste down. Da-Capo has been produced as a chocolate bar since 1949, and the wrapped pralines returned to the market in 1957. The pralines had been away from the market for some time, but nowadays they are sold at Christmas time and in travel sortiments at airports.

== Packaging ==
Da-Capo is sold as a chocolate bar weighing 20 grams, in praline boxes of three kilograms and 350 grams and in bags on 130 grams.

== Ingredients ==
The alcohol content in Da-Capo is minimal, as the chocolate mass is cooked to 110 degrees Celsius, causing most of the alcohol to evaporate. The rum content of the chocolate bar might still have an effect in a breath analysis test, if the test is done immediately after eating a Da-Capo bar. The mass is coated in dark chocolate.

- sugar
- starch syrup
- cocoa mass
- cocoa butter
- vegetable fat
- rum
- fat-free powdered milk
- butterfat
- whey
- emulsifier (soy lecithin)
- aromas (such as vanillin)
- maraschino
- salt
