= Fazer Blue =

Finnish brand of milk chocolate

Karl Fazer Milk Chocolate
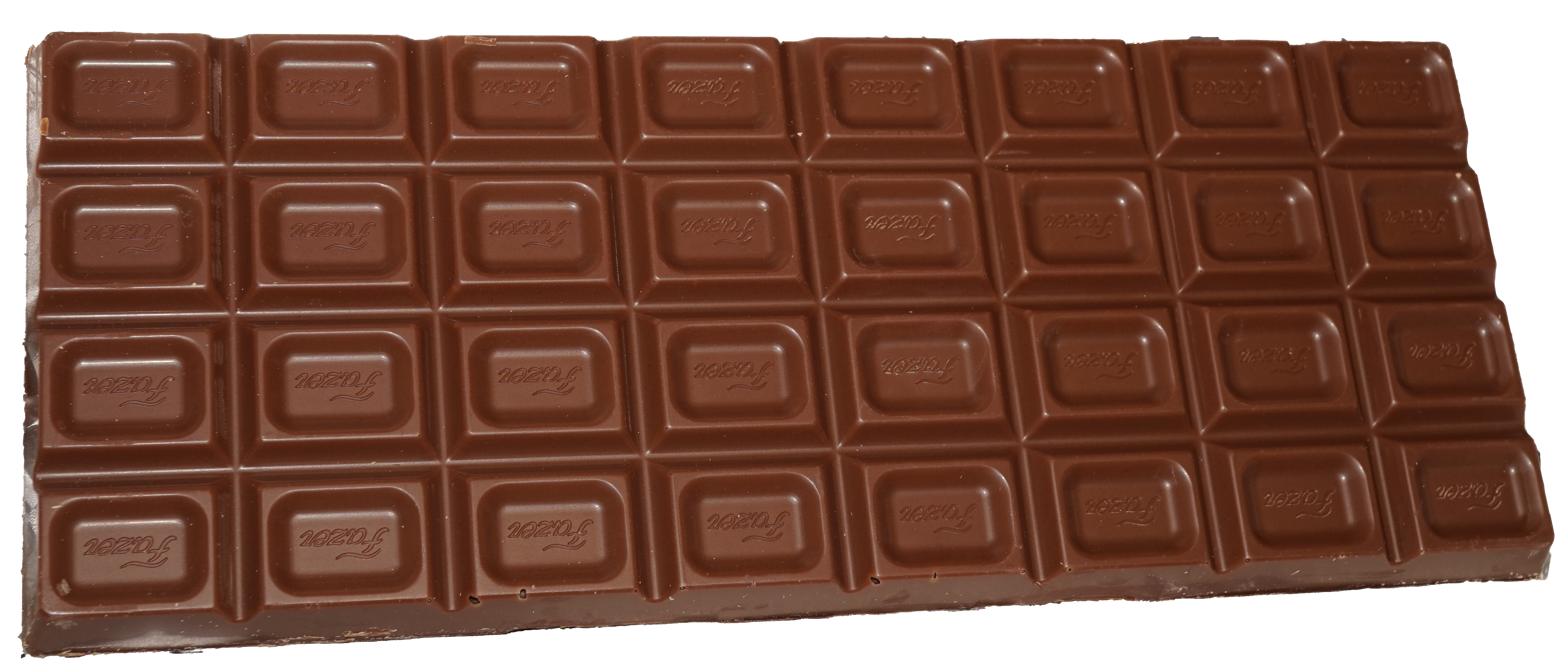
- A 200 gram slab of Fazer Blue
- Alternative names: Fazer Blue
- Type: Chocolate
- Place of origin: Finland
- Created by: Karl Fazer
- Invented: 1922; 104 years ago
- Variations: Forms: Chocolate slabs, bars and individual pieces Flavors: Blueberry yogurt, cookie, cranberry, chili, hazelnut, hazelnut-raisin, liquorice, popcorn, raspberry yogurt, raspberry liquorice, red berries, salted caramel, strawberry-vanilla, toffee

Karl Fazer Milk Chocolate, commonly known as Fazer Blue (Finnish: Fazerin Sininen, Swedish: Fazers blå), is a Finnish brand of milk chocolate owned by the Fazer corporation. The common name derives from the iconic blue color of its wrapper, which is a registered color trademark of the Fazer corporation.

Fazer Blue is often ranked as the best-selling confectionery in Finland. It also regularly polls as the most respected brand among Finns, particularly in polls conducted by the magazine Markkinointi & Mainonta and the polling organization Taloustutkimus Oy.

The chocolate is widely considered a part of Finnish cultural heritage and cuisine. It owes its unique taste to the use of fresh milk in production, as opposed to powdered and condensed milk commonly used in chocolate manufacturing. Compared to other chocolates, Fazer Blue also has a relatively high milk concentration.

The chocolate is sold in various forms and amounts, ranging from 200 g (7.1 oz) slabs to boxes of confectionery pieces.

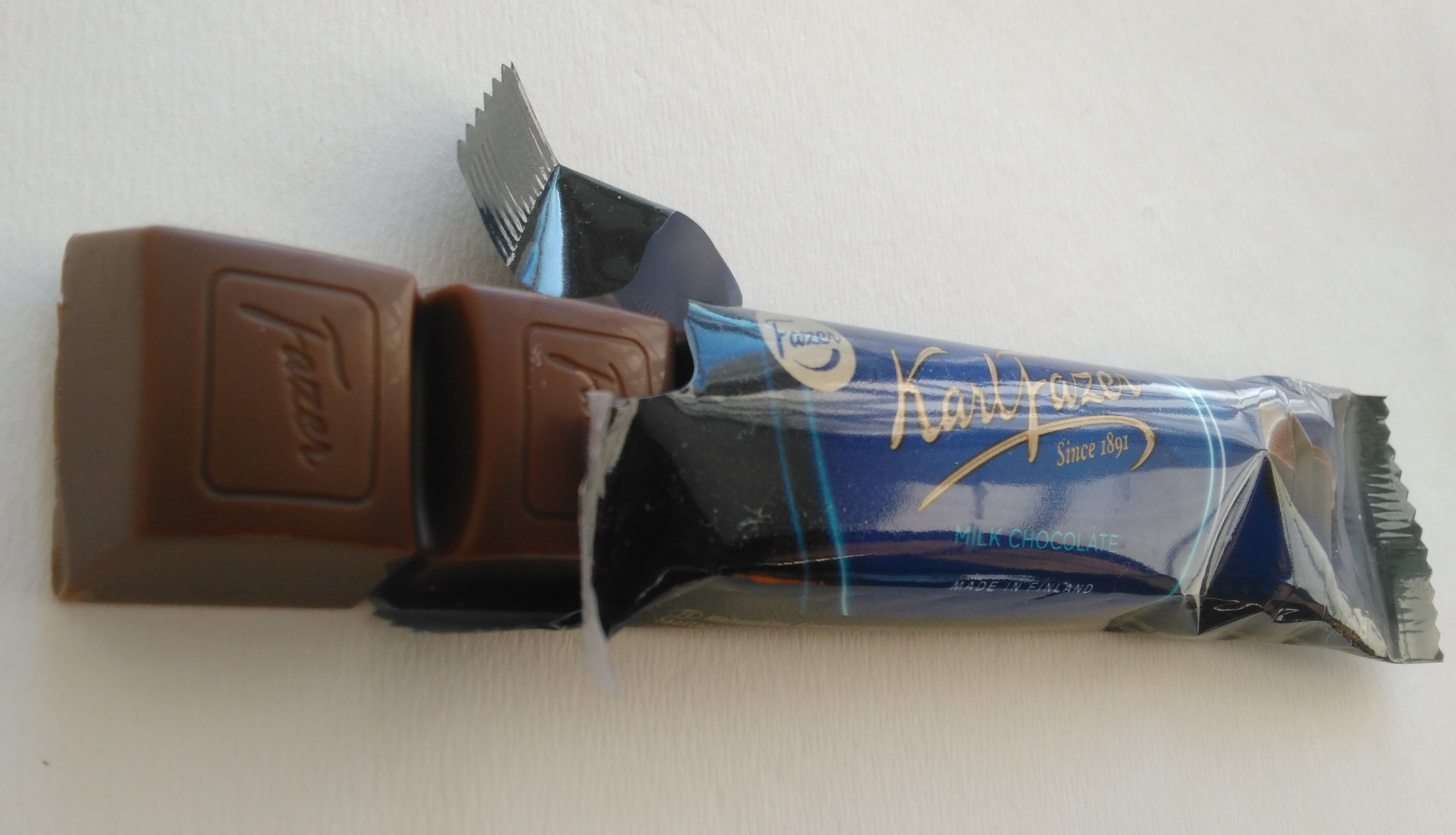
38g Fazer Blue chocolate bar

== History ==
The chocolate was brought to market in 1922. According to the Fazer corporation, the Swiss recipe was a gift to the Fazer family from an Englishman. The recipe has remained unchanged since.

In 2001, the Fazer Blue color, Pantone C 280 , became Finland's first color trademark. At the 2012 Summer Olympics, Karl Fazer Milk Chocolate sponsored the Finnish sailing team.

== See also ==
- Kalev
- Marabou
- Milka
- Hershey's
