= Mazetti =

Defunct confectionery manufacturer

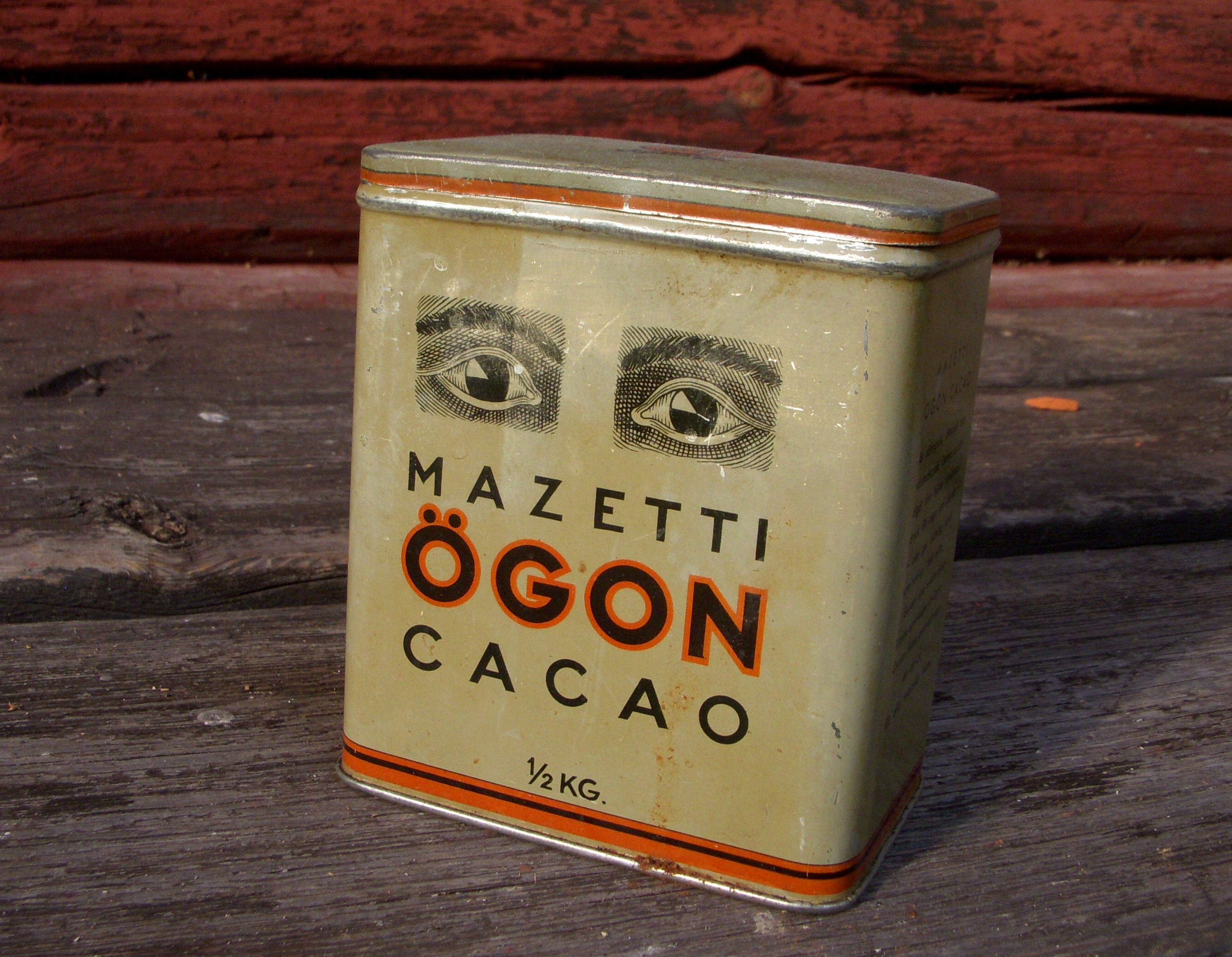
A box of 'Ögoncacao', an icon of Mazetti

Mazetti AB was a Swedish manufacturer of cacao, chocolate and other candies founded and based in Malmö, Sweden. It was acquired by the Finnish Fazer company in 1975.

== History ==
Mazetti was founded in 1888 by Danish confectioner Emil Nissen, originally named Malmö Choklad och Konfektfabriks AB. A factory was built on Bergsgatan in central Malmö, with the work led by Christian Lauritz Müller.

=== The Mazetti building ===
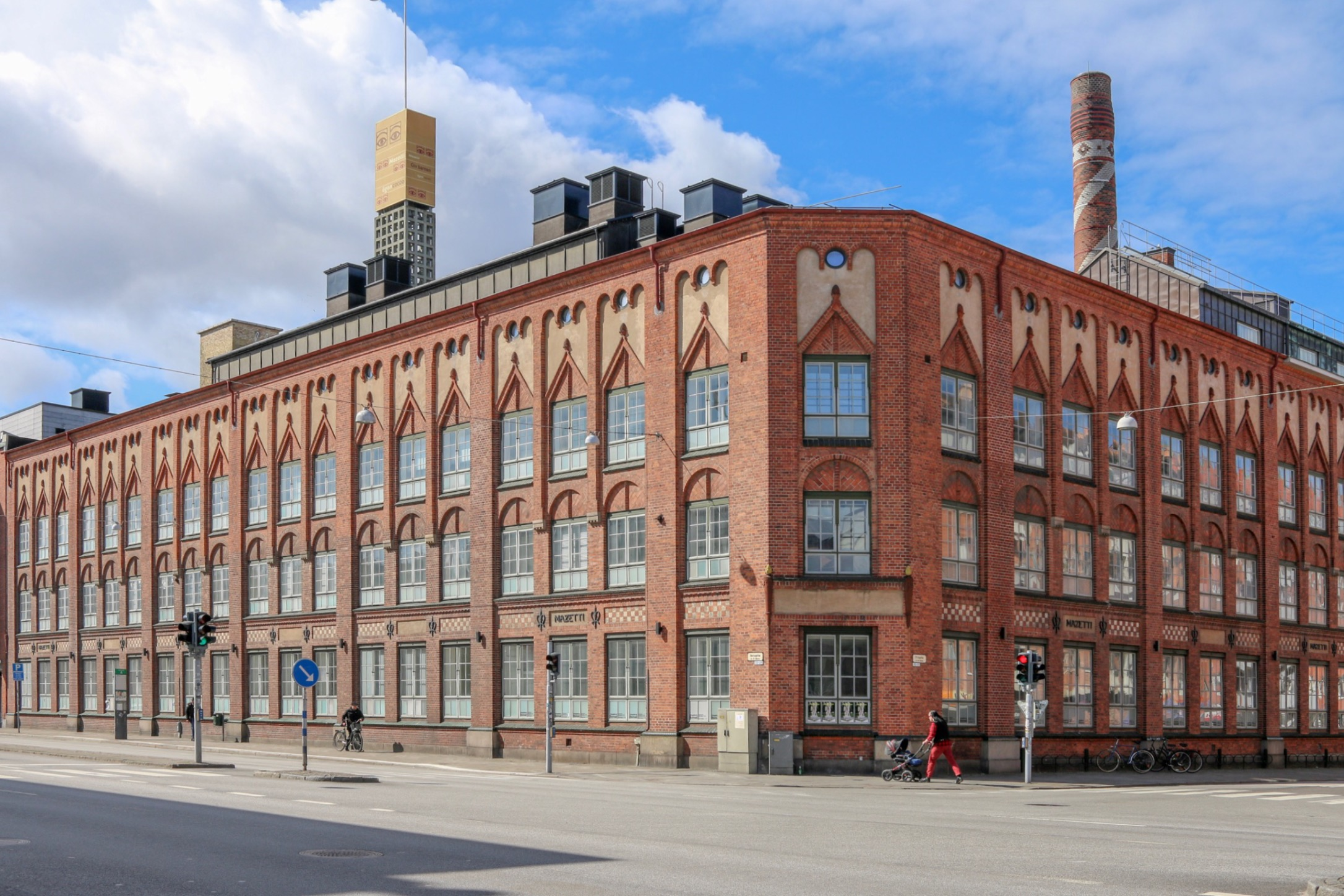
The Mazetti building in 2017, note the 'packet' of Ögoncacao on the roof

Manufacturing in Malmö ended in 1992, but the factory building remains and today houses the Mazetti Culture House (Swedish: Kulturhuset Mazetti) which opened on February 3 2006.

== Products ==
Mazetti started several product lines which continue as Fazer products today:

- The Ögon brand is used for cacao and baking chocolate by Fazer
- Dumle
- Kina
- Tutti Frutti
