= Kismet (chocolate bar) =

Finnish chocolate bar

Kismet is a Finnish chocolate bar produced by Fazer.

Kismet is a flat, rectangular bar. It is about 15 cm long, 5 cm wide and 1 cm thick. It is divided into four sections that are easy to break from each other. It weighs about 55 g and contains an estimated 283 calories with 17 g of total fat.

Kismet is made of crisp waffle and nougat covered in milk chocolate.

In late 2009, early 2010 Fazer began an advertising campaign for the new Raspberry flavoured Kismet bar.
