= Pihlaja =

Brand of candy

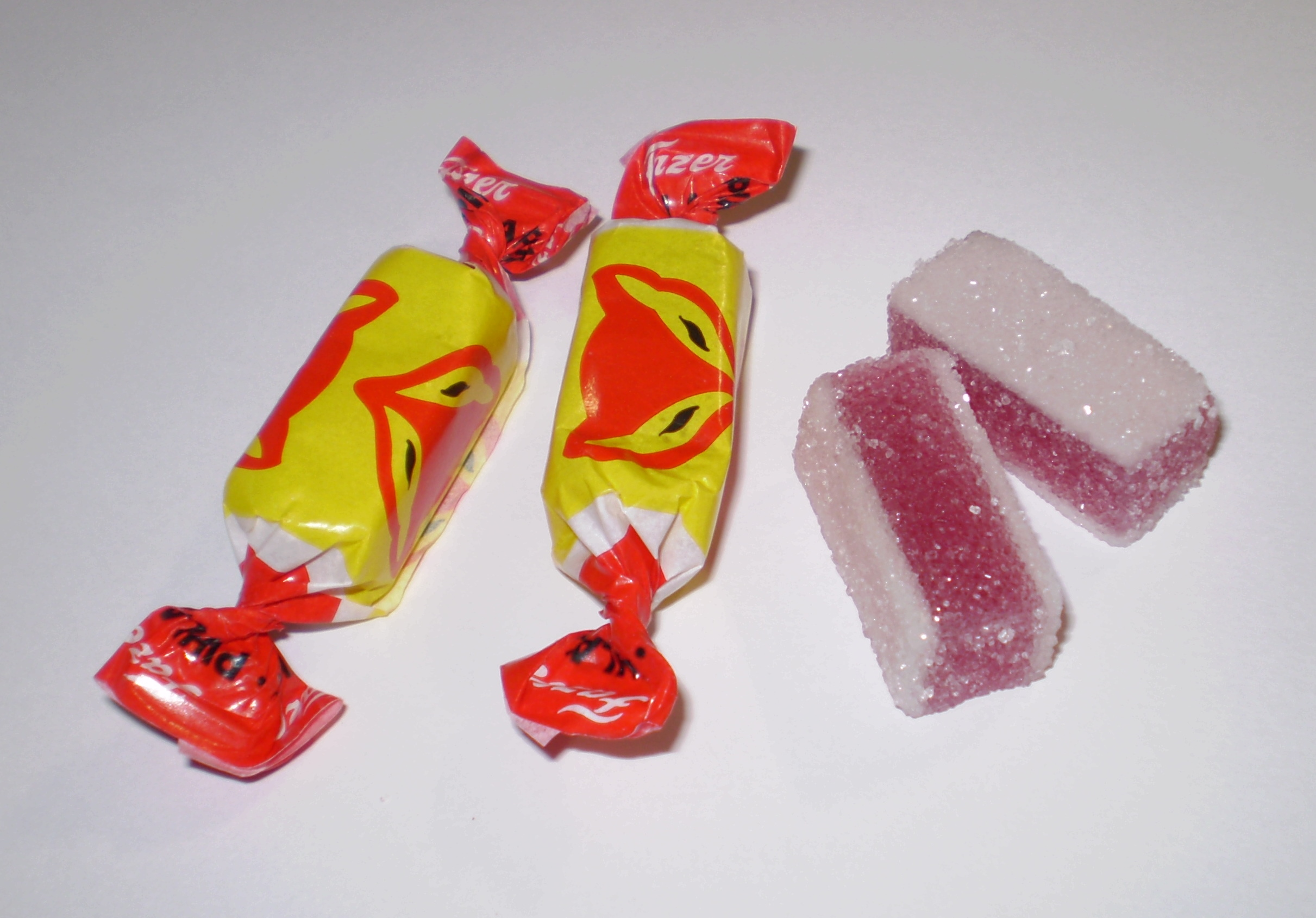
- Pihlaja candies
- Alternative names: Kettukarkki, Pihlajanmarja
- Type: Marmalade candy
- Place of origin: Finland
- Created by: Karl Fazer
- Invented: 1895; 131 years ago

Pihlaja (Finnish for "rowan"), also called kettukarkki ("fox candy") is a marmalade candy produced by the Finnish food corporation Fazer. Fazer started producing the candy in 1895 at the patisserie on Kluuvikatu, Helsinki, making it the oldest candy produced by Fazer still on the market. The candy's recipe has changed over time. The candies are wrapped in a yellow-red paper with a red illustration of a fox. Pihlaja is lactose free and mostly gluten free (less than 0.02% gluten).

The candy originally contained Sorbus aucuparia berries, but due to poor availability the recipe now only contains artificial flavors. Until 1982 the candy was known as "Pihlajanmarja" (rowan berry). The candy is produced in a factory in Lappeenranta.
