= Minion (chat widget) =

Minion Logo

Minion (Hangul: 미니온) is a chatting widget developed by DevArzz, the South Korean server. It is created with Python 2.7.x version and twistedmatrix 11.0 library. Minion can be built on to the Web browsers. In addition, there are public and non-public channels; non-public channels are usually installed on the private web pages, but it can be upgraded to public later on as they pay.

== Functions ==
Minion has functions that most of chatting programs have. It is similar to the chatting programs of how to use it. Minion mainly has six functions:

- Call: calls other users on the chatting. It makes beeping sound while calling the users.
- Whisper: chats to another user. It appears to be purple/pink while whisper to another user. No other users can see the whisper log.
- Private Channel: creates the private channel. The creator of private channel can invite other users to the channel. However, the users cannot get into the channel unless they got invited.
- Status: the user can change their status. There are three status: away, do not disturb, and online. It is similar to the status system in Windows Messenger or Skype.
- IP Ban: bans the IP of user from the channel. It requires the API key to activate this certain type of function.
- Cutoff the Chatting: blocks the user from chatting for 30 seconds. The user still can watch the chatting and is able to whisper to other users. It requires the API key to do it. It is also possible to use this function if the user has created his/her own private channel.

The chatting will also cutoff if the user either types same text more than three lines, or types 10 lines before the 15 seconds. It gives four warnings, and after the warning, the user's IP will automatically banned from the server.

== Servers ==
Minion has different servers to hold up all the users accessing from different locations. There are total 11 servers, 66,500 capacity (of users), and 724 channels. All Minion servers are running through DevArzz server, so web traffic does not shut down because of the over-limited users. The servers are named after the planet and its satellites.

=== Server #1 EARTH ===
- EARTH: holds up 500 users, has 31 open channels.
- MOON: holds up 500 users, has 50 open channels.
- ISS: holds up 500 users, has no open channel.

=== Server #2 MARS ===
- MARS: holds up 5,000 users, has 160 open channels.
- PHOBOS: holds up 5,000 users, has 186 open channels.
- DEIMOS: holds up 5,000 users, has 192 open channels.
- VENUS: holds up 10,000 users, has no open channel.

=== Server #3 JUPITER ===
- JUPITER: holds up 10,000 users, has 64 open channels.
- IO: holds up 10,000 users, has 9 open channels.
- EUROPA: holds up 10,000 users, has 27 open channels.
- GANYMEDE: holds up 10,000 users, has 5 open channels.

== Web Browsers ==
Minion runs on any type of web browsers. Unfortunately, Minion cannot run on iPod Safari. Minion is developed by JavaScript and Adobe Flash. Since Safari for iPhone (or other similar devices of Apple) does not support the flash movie or .swf formats, Minion cannot be run on Safari. However, it is possible for Minion to run on Apple devices using the Minion Apps.
