= Finlandia (candy) =

Gummy candy brand

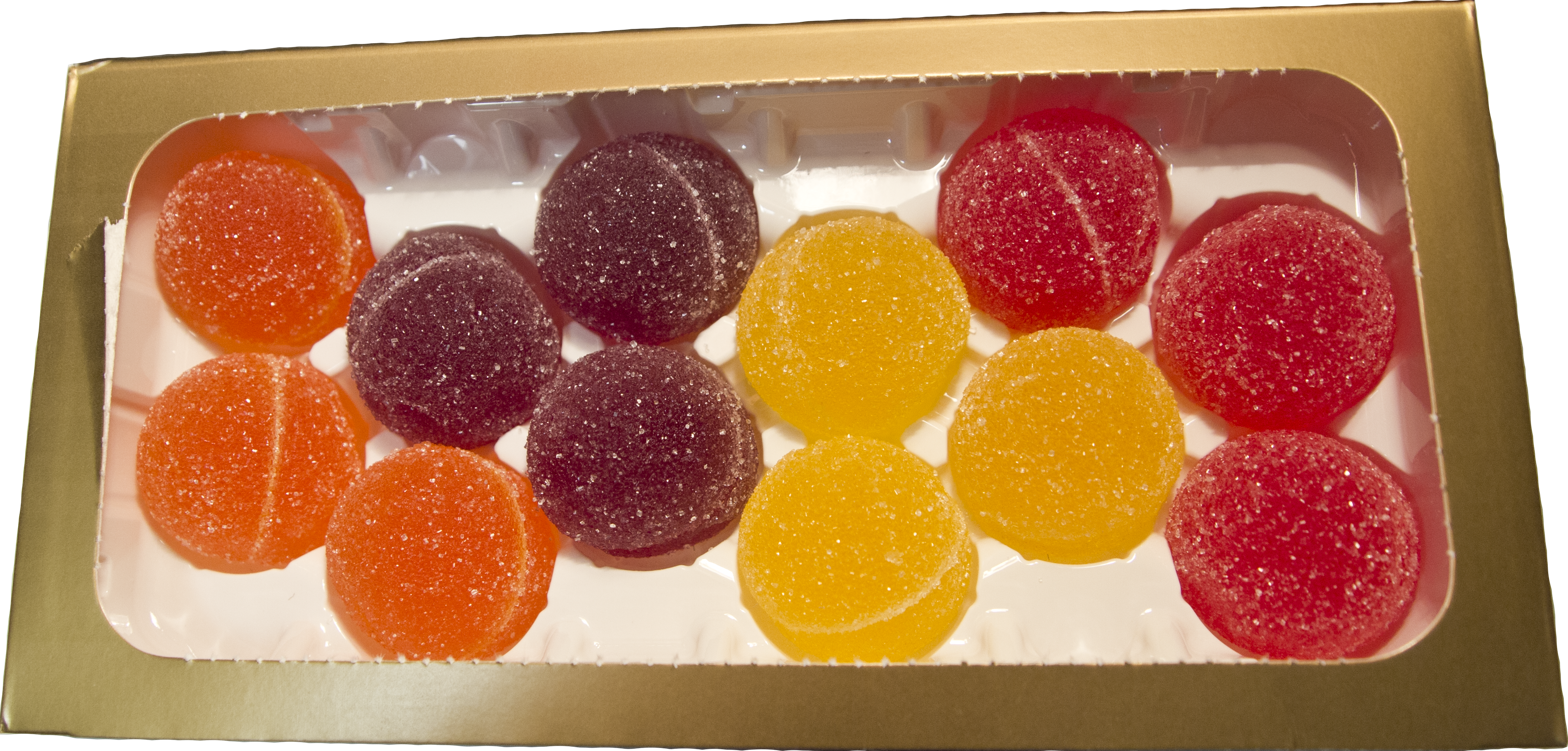
- A box of Finlandia gummy candy.
- Alternative names: marmalade
- Type: Gummy candy
- Place of origin: Finland
- Created by: Fazer
- Invented: 1902

Finlandia is a brand of gummy candies (known as marmalade in Finland) produced by the Finnish company Fazer. It is Fazer's first export product.

== Production ==
In the 1950s, the gummy candy was produced in metal molds, which were placed into a refrigerator for a short while, after which the candies were taken out of the mold one at a time with a fork. Since 2000 the gummy spheres have been separated by machine by pressing two sheets containing hemisphere-shaped gummy candy pieces together.

The candies were originally fruit-shaped, but nowadays the candies are spherical, pressed together from two hemispheres.

== History ==
In 1902 Fazer sent fruit gummy candies to king Edward VII's coronation. The wooden box was decorated with the crown of the king of the United Kingdom. In 1947 fruit gummy candies were sent as a wedding present to crown princess Elizabeth and duke Philip. A box of Finlandia candies was also sent to Charles III when he officially became king. In 1948 the name of the product was changed from Kruunajaismarmeladi ("coronation marmalade") to Finlandia, but the coronation picture reminiscent of the candy's history was kept.

Since 2008 the Finlandia candy selection has contained traditional flavours popular among consumers: apricot, blackcurrant, lemon, strawberry and pear.
