= John Minnion =

British artist (born 1949)

John Minnion (born Guildford, 13 August 1949) is an English illustrator.

His distinctive black and white drawings have appeared in publications such as the Financial Times, The Guardian, and The Times, where for six years he illustrated the television criticism column written by Lynne Truss, author of the surprise best-seller about punctuation, Eats, Shoots and Leaves. Minnion drew politicians for the New Statesman and composers (both jazz and classical) for The Listener. His skilful caricatures are drawn always from photographs, never from life.

Among Minnion's earliest issued works, which he published himself, are illustrated versions of Lewis Carroll's Jabberwocky (1973) and The Hunting of the Snark (1976). He also issued a small folio of illustrations to Samuel Beckett's Waiting for Godot.

Most recently, Minnion has published several books that bring together drawn and written portraits, under the label of his own publishing company, Checkmate Books. The first of these books was Glued to the Gogglebox, which brought together various British television personalities. His second publication centred on 20th-century composers and was named Uneasy Listening. This was closely followed by Hitler's List, a compendium of those found undesirable by the Third Reich, from Gypsies to Jews, concentrating on the so-called degenerate art. His most recent publication is Pool of Life: The Story of Liverpool in Caricatures, which has been released as part of the city's year as European Capital of Culture.

He currently lives in Liverpool.
