= Mignon (name) =

Mignon is a feminine given name and a surname. It may refer to:

== Given name ==
- Mignon Anderson (1892–1983), American actress
- Mignon Holland Anderson (born 1945), American writer
- Mignon Clyburn (born 1962), a commissioner at the Federal Communications Commission
- Mignon du Preez (born 1989), South African cricketer
- Mignon Dunn (1928–2026), American mezzo-soprano and voice teacher
- Mignon G. Eberhart (1899–1996), American mystery novelist
- Mignon Fogarty (born 1967), aka “Grammar Girl”, American professor of journalism and former science writer
- Mignon McLaughlin (1913–1983), American journalist and author
- Mignon Nevada (1886–1971), English operatic soprano
- Mignon O'Doherty (1890–1961), Australian actress who worked in British theatre, film and television
- Mignon Talbot (1869–1950), American paleontologist

== Surname ==
- Abraham Mignon (1640–1679), Dutch painter
- Clément Mignon (born 1993), French swimmer
- Edward Mignon (1885–1925), English first-class cricketer
- Emmanuelle Mignon (born 1968), French politician
- Hélène Mignon (1934–2026), French politician
- Herman Mignon (born 1951), Belgian middle-distance runner
- Jean-Claude Mignon (born 1950), French politician
- Léon Mignon (1847–1898), Belgian sculptor
- William Mignon (1874–1965), West Indian cricketer
