= Fred Minion =

English footballer

Personal information
- Full name: Frederick Minion
- Position: Wing-half

Senior career*
Years	Team	Apps	(Gls)
1908–1909	Burnley	2	(0)
- * Club domestic league appearances and goals

Frederick Minion was an English professional footballer who played as a wing-half. He made two appearances in the Football League for Burnley.

Minion also played for Bacup and Chorley.
