= Geisha Williams =

Cuban American businesswoman

- Born: 1961 or 1962 (age 64–65); Cuba
- Education: University of Miami (BA); Nova Southeastern University (MBA)
- Title: Former CEO, Pacific Gas and Electric Company
- Term: March 2017 - January 2019
- Spouse: Jay Williams
- Children: 2 daughters

Geisha J. Williams (born Jimenez, c. 1961/1962) is a Cuban American businesswoman. She was the president and CEO of the Pacific Gas and Electric Company (PG&E) from March 2017 to January 13, 2019.

== Early life ==
Williams was born Geisha J. Jimenez in Cuba. Her parents named her Geisha from the title of a John Wayne movie, The Barbarian and the Geisha. At the age of five, Geisha migrated to the US with her parents, after her father, a political prisoner in Cuba, was released from prison. Her father worked various jobs to provide for his family and went on to own their own grocery store.

She has a bachelor's degree in industrial engineering from the University of Miami and an MBA from Nova Southeastern University.

== Career ==
While at the University of Miami, Williams interned for Florida Power & Light (FPL). She returned to the company after earning her degree, starting as a residential energy auditor. In 2005, she was the company's vice president for distribution and was in charge of the restoration effort after Hurricane Wilma.

Williams joined Pacific Gas and Electric Company (PG&E) in 2007. In 2010, she was Vice President for Energy Delivery, and in 2011, she was put in charge of electric operations.

In March 2017, Williams became the first Latina chief executive officer of a Fortune 500 company.

She has been a director at the Edison Electric Institute, the Institute of Nuclear Power Operations, and the Association of Edison Illuminating Companies, the board chairwoman for the Center for Energy Workforce Development, and a trustee of the California Academy of Sciences. She is on the Board of Directors for the Bipartisan Policy Center.

== Personal life ==
Williams is married, and she and her husband have two daughters.
