= Karl Fazer =

Finnish businessman and sport shooter (1866–1932)

Karl Otto Fazer
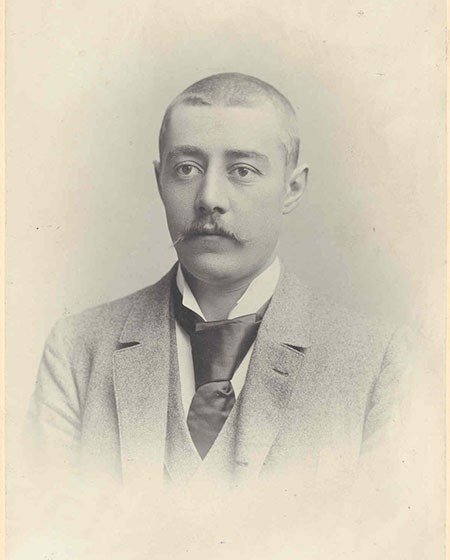
- A portrait of Karl Fazer
- Born: 16 August 1866; Helsinki, Grand Duchy of Finland
- Died: 9 October 1932 (aged 66); Jokioinen, Finland
- Occupations: Businessperson, confectioner, sport shooter

Karl Otto Fazer (Finland Swedish pronunciation: [ˈkɑːrl ˈutːo ˈfat͡sær], 16 August 1866 – 9 October 1932) was a Finnish chocolatier and sport shooter. He is the founder of Fazer, one of the largest food industry companies in the Nordic countries.

== Biography ==
He was born in Helsinki. His father, Eduard Peter Fazer (originally Fatzer), was a Swiss-born furrier. Fazer had seven siblings, among them the pianist Edvard Fazer. He married Berta Blomqvist (1876−1959) in 1894 and they had four children. He was the grandfather of Peter Fazer.

Fazer studied baking in Berlin, Paris, and Saint Petersburg before becoming a pioneer of Finnish confectionery. Together with his wife Berta he opened a French-Russian confectionery at Glogatan (Kluuvikatu) 3 in Helsinki on 17 September 1891. Later, he opened a chocolate and candy factory in Punavuori.

Fazer, the company he founded, is still in existence. Many of its products have become classic. This is particularly true of the Fazer Blue (Finnish: Fazerin Sininen, Swedish: Fazer Blå), a brand of chocolate that is often compared to salmiakki, as a candy that is a part of the Finnish national identity.

Fazer established bird protection areas in the Åland archipelago and on the lands of the Taubila farm he bought in 1918 in Pyhäjärvi, Vyborg County, Karelia. He brought pheasants to Finland and owned a pheasant farm near Helsinki at the beginning of the 20th century.

Fazer raised pheasants, which he donated to Carl Wilhelm Rosenlew, the owner of Vanajanlinna Manor.

He was awarded the title kauppaneuvos in 1926.

Fazer died in 1932 at the age of 66 after suffering a heart attack on a hunting trip in Jokioinen. He is buried in the Hietaniemi Cemetery.

== 1912 Olympics ==
Fazer was an excellent marksman who participated in the Olympic Games in 1912 with the Finnish shooting team. He placed twelfth in men's trap and fifth in men's team trap.
