= Peter Fazer =

Finnish sailor

Karl Peter Fazer (23 October 1934 – 24 October 1998) was a Finnish sailor who competed in the 1964 Summer Olympics. In 1985–86, he was a crewmember on the boat Fazer Finland in the Whitbread Round the World Yacht Race.
