= Fazer =

Finnish confectionery and food company

Oy Karl Fazer Ab
- Trade name: Fazer
- Type: Business group
- Industry: Foodservice
- Founded: 1891; 135 years ago
- Founder: Karl Fazer
- Headquarters: Helsinki, Finland
- Website: fazer.fi

Oy Karl Fazer Ab, trading as Fazer (Finnish pronunciation: [ˈfɑtser], Finland Swedish pronunciation: [ˈfat͡sær]), is one of the largest corporations in the Finnish food industry. The company was founded by Karl Fazer in 1891, as a "French-Russian café" in central Helsinki. Today, it employs over 6,000 people across Finland, Sweden, Latvia, Lithuania, Estonia, Denmark, Norway and Poland. Its products are exported to more than 40 countries.

== History ==
Fazer acquired Swedish confectionery company Mazetti in 1975, Mazetti started several product lines which are now iconic to Fazer, including Dumle and Tutti Frutti.

Fazer formed a partnership with United Biscuits in its Fazer Keksit (which made biscuits) and UB owned 70 per cent of it until 2000.

Fazer has historically acquired several other companies, including the Finnish Chymos and the Danish Perelly. The confectionery line was merged with its Swedish competitor Cloetta in 2000, to become Cloetta Fazer, though the merger lasted only until 2008 before the two brands were separated back to independent companies. Later, Fazer Keksit was sold to Danone. It was renamed to LU Suomi, the entirety of which was bought back by Fazer in 2012 from Kraft Foods Inc. (now Mondelez International) and now operates under Fazer Confectionery.

Fazer Visitor Centre, Vantaa, soon after opening in November 2016

November 2016 saw the opening of a 5,000-square-metre (54,000 sq ft) Visitor Centre at their confectionery factory at Fazerintie in Vantaa. The avant-gardist building, in the shape of two circles with a botanical garden at the centre of one of them, was designed by K2S Architects. The Visitor Centre also includes a café, congress wing and shop.

In the summer of 2019, Fazer bought the Finnish company Kaslink Foods, which specializes in plant-based foods. According to Fazer, it sought a stronger focus on consumer products through the acquisition and saw growth opportunities, especially in the oat-based products that Kaslink manufactures. Just a few days earlier, Fazer had announced that it would sell its Fazer Food Services restaurant operations to the British Compass Group as part of the company's strategy focused on consumer products.

Following the 2022 Russian invasion of Ukraine, Fazer sold its Russian business to bakery firm Kolomenskij.

== Corporate affairs ==
=== Business areas and management ===
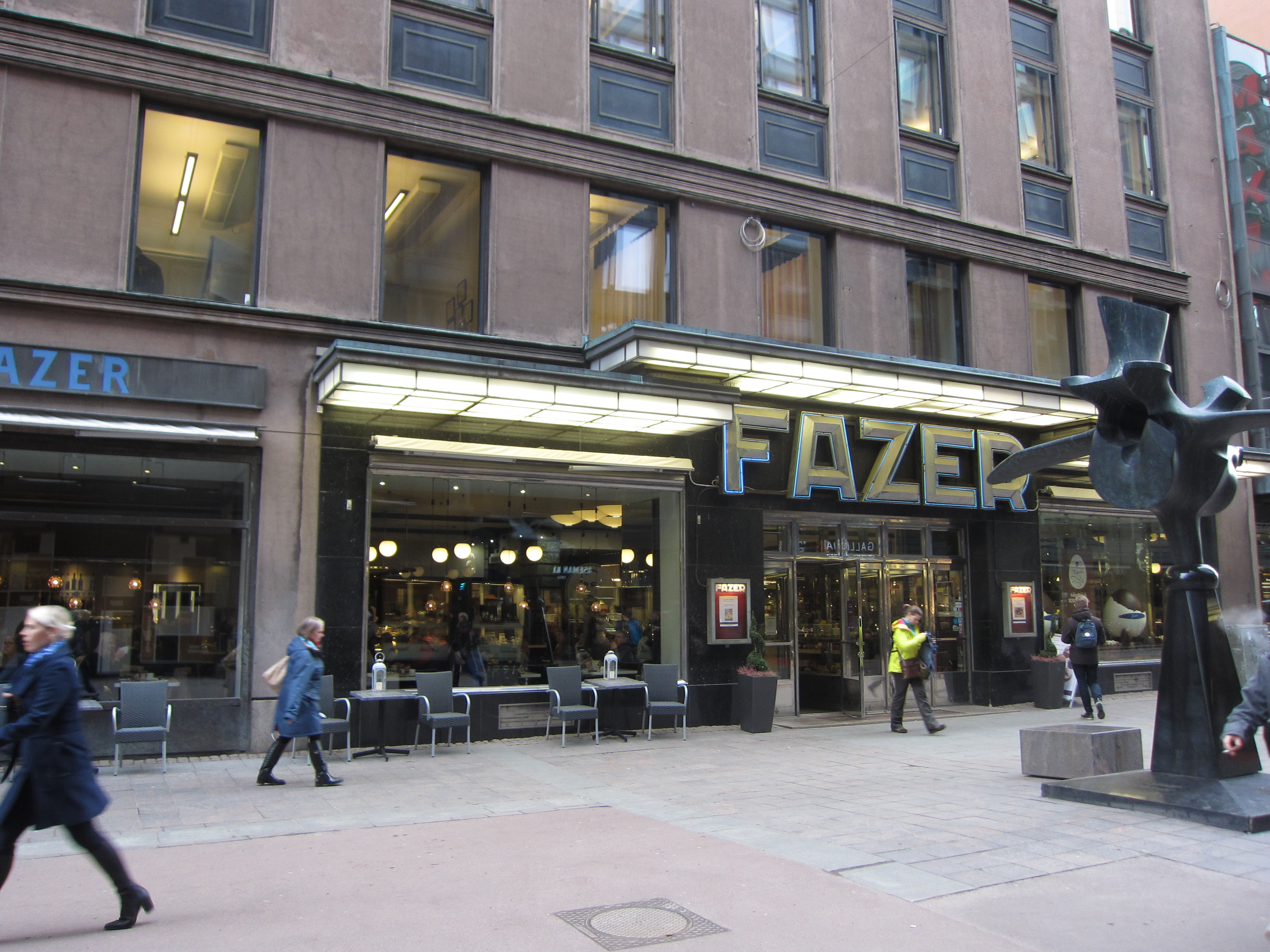
Karl Fazer Café in Finland

Fazer Group includes communications, legal, HR, finance and treasury, risk management, security, investment management, corporate planning, property management and internal audit. Shared services include IT, accounting and human resources.

Fazer operates through three Business Areas. The business areas are Fazer Bakeries, Fazer Confectionery and Fazer Lifestyle Foods.

== Products and services ==
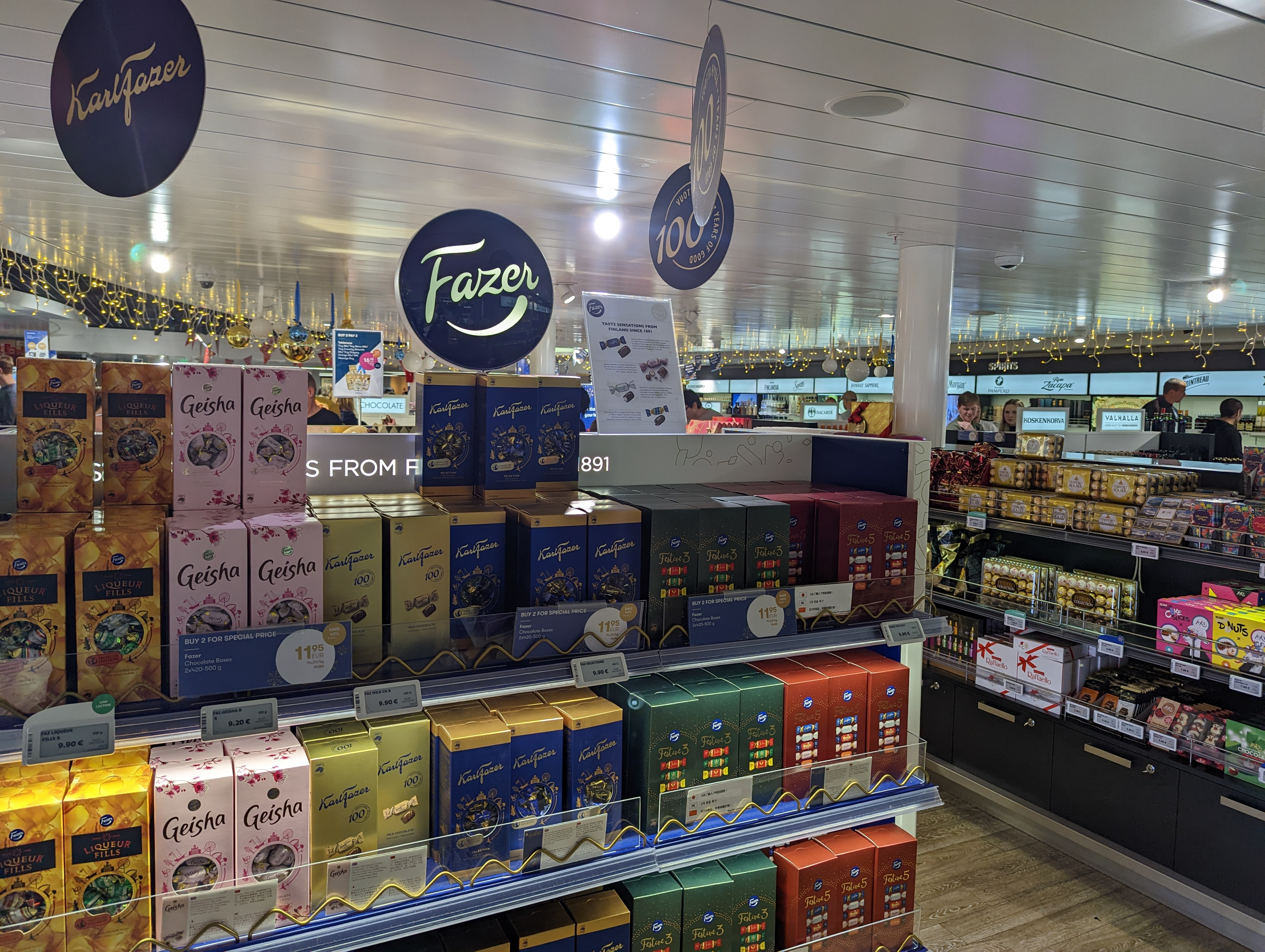
Fazer chocolate products

=== Products ===
Fazer's most notable products include its classic Fazer Blue (Fazerin sininen) milk chocolate, widely regarded as one of Finland's most respected brands and a part of Finnish cultural heritage and cuisine. Other well-known Fazer products include their salmiakki (salty licorice) products, such as Fazer salmiakki, Tyrkisk Peber and salmiakki-flavoured Fazer Blue.

=== Fazer Bakery ===
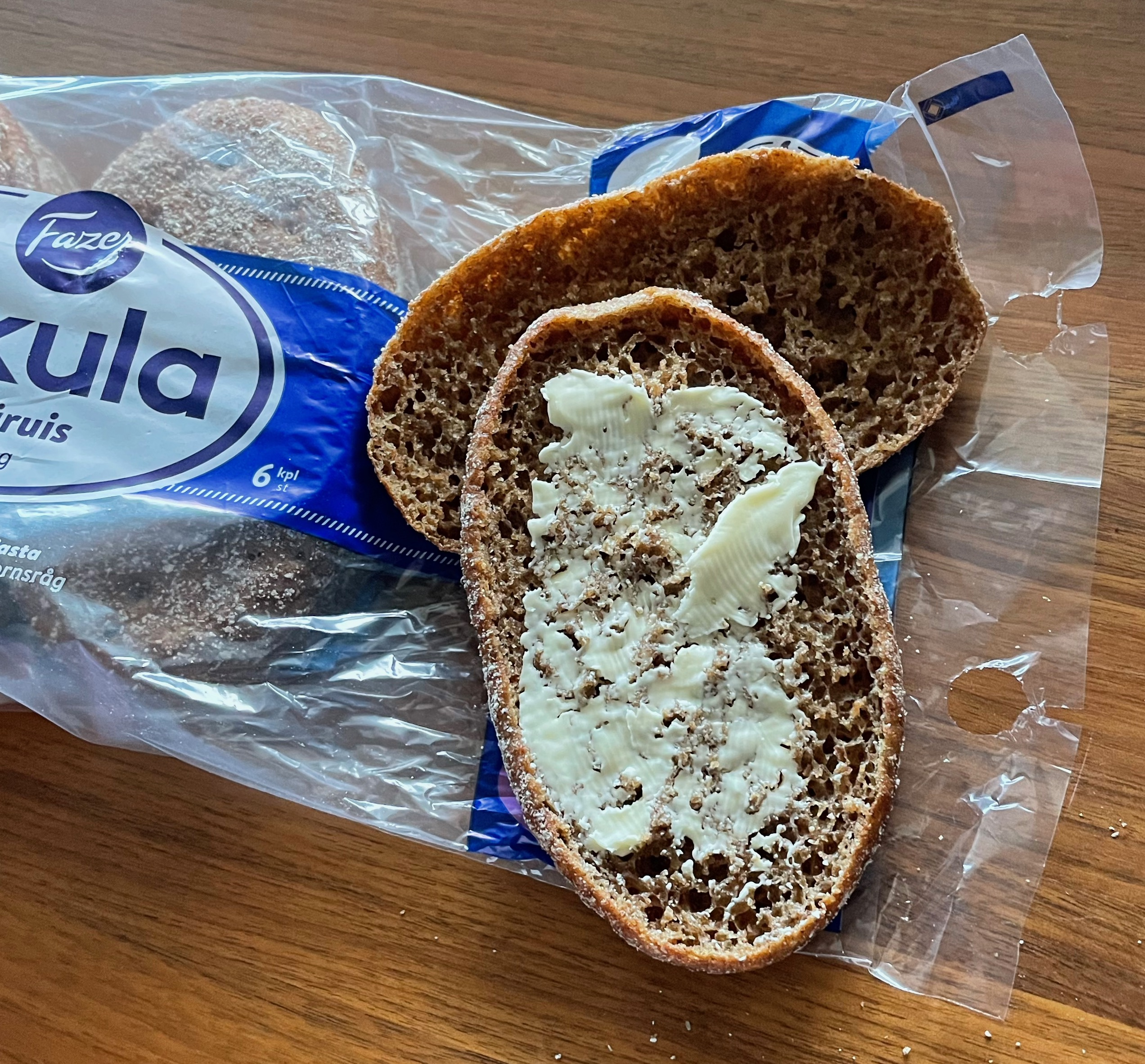
Fazer Puikula Ruisleipä (rye bread)

Fazer operates 9 large-scale bakeries across Finland, Sweden and the Baltics and exports its bakery products to 21 countries. In addition to these, Fazer operates 136 small-scale in-store bakeries in large Finnish supermarkets. In 2018, Fazer's cricket bread won the Bronze Lion in the Sustainable Development Goals section of the Cannes Lions International Festival of Creativity.

Fazer's bakery brands include Oululainen, Skogaholm, Druva and Gardesis. Fazer produces its biscuits in Vantaa, and its biscuit brands in Finland include Jyväshyvä, Domino, Jaffa, Fasupala, Carneval, Suklaalehti, Muro and Hangon. Fazer's Lappeenranta bakery produces Karelian pies. Fazer's Karelian pies are Rukiinen piirakka, Rukiinen Imatran Riisipirakka (rice pasty), Vuoksen piirakka, Rukiinen Perunapiirakka (potato pasty) and Rukiinen Porkkanapiirakka (carrot pasty). In April 2016, Fazer was reported to have bought back the Domino, Jaffa and Fanipala brands.

=== Fazer Confectionery ===
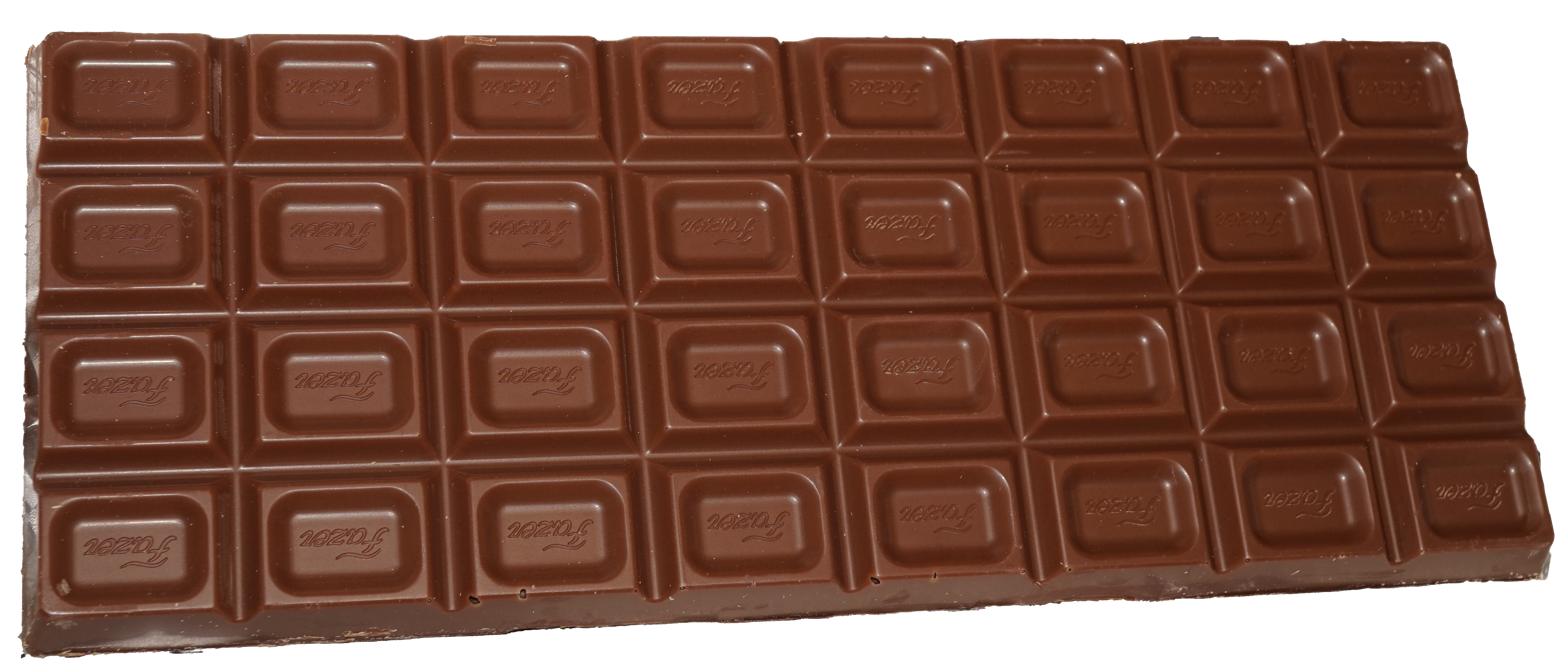
Fazer Blue (Finnish: Fazerin Sininen) chocolate bar

Fazer is the leading producer of chocolates, sweets and biscuits in Finland with a market share of 30-40%. The Confectionery division has production facilities in Vantaa and Lappeenranta. Confectionery is sold in more than 40 countries.

Fazer's confectionery factories in Finland are located in Lappeenranta (sugar confectionery) and Vantaa (chocolates). The company produces 25,000 tonnes of chocolate per year. It became a member of the World Cocoa Organization in 2005.

Fazer Retail operates Fazer Cafés in Finland and Gateau bakery shops in Finland and Sweden. The flagship Fazer Café is on Kluuvikatu in Helsinki, opened in 1891. It is a rare example of Art Deco design in Finland.

Confectionery brands

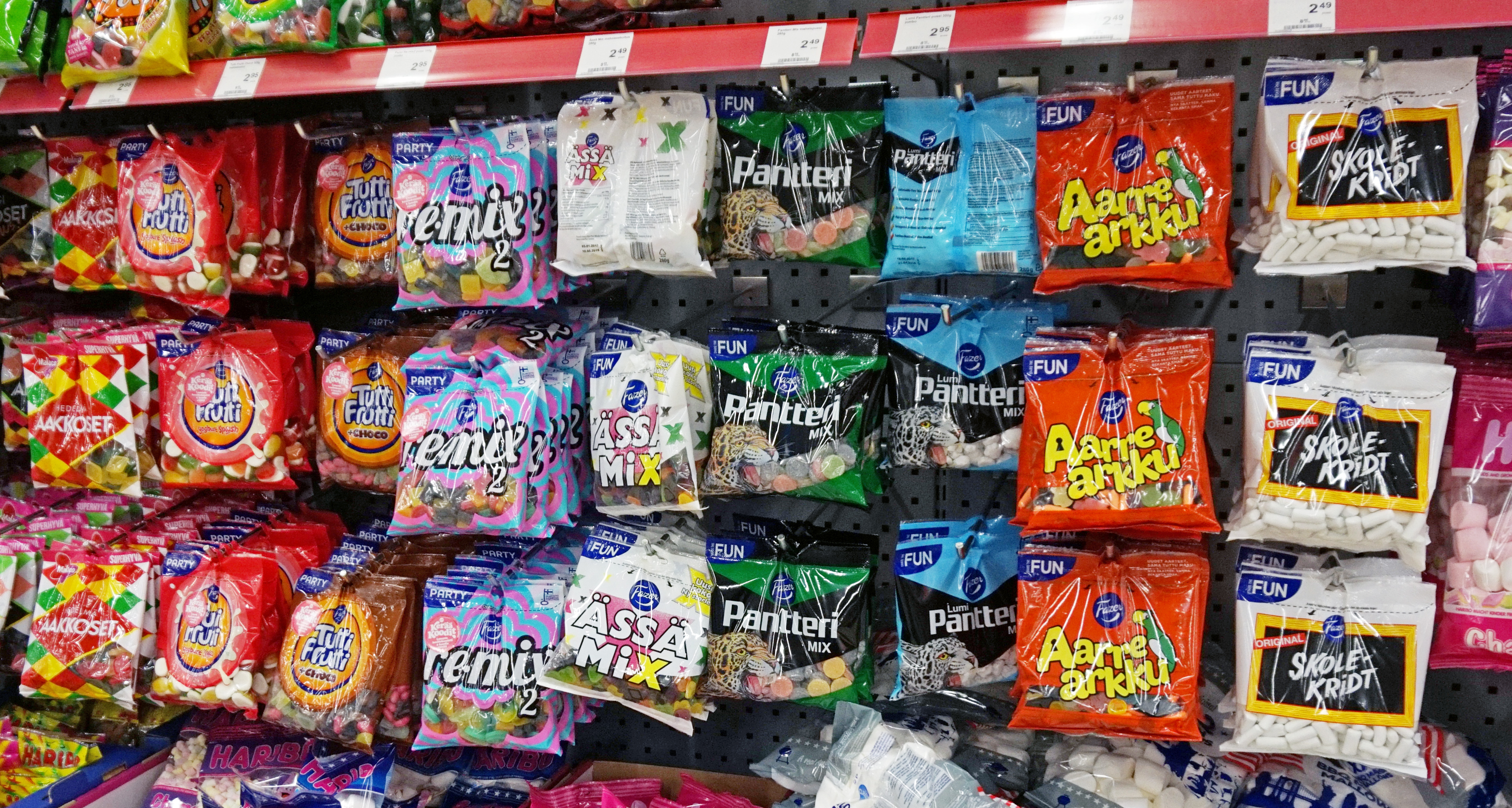
Fazer candy packs

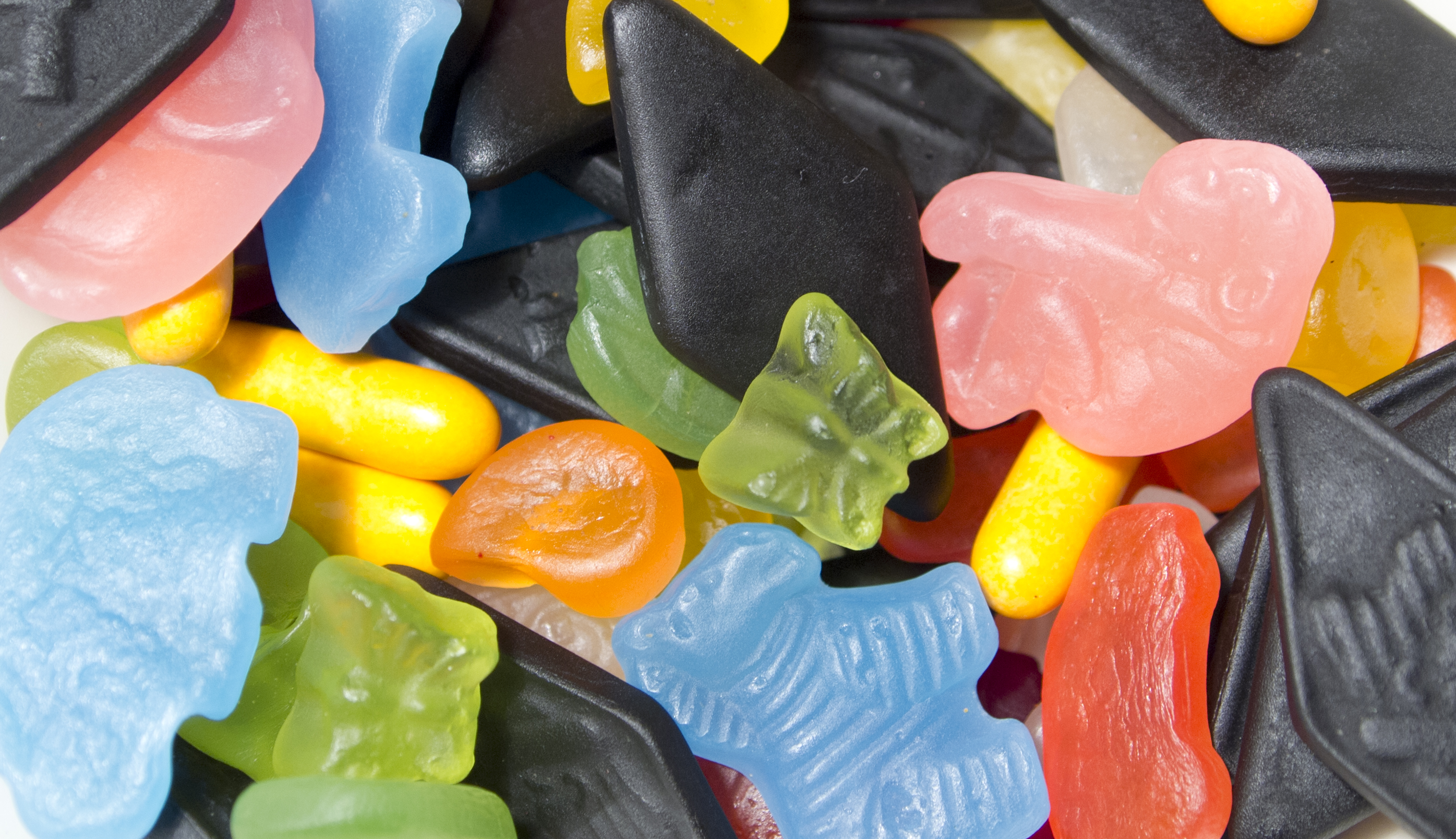
Aarrearkku (Treasure chest) candies

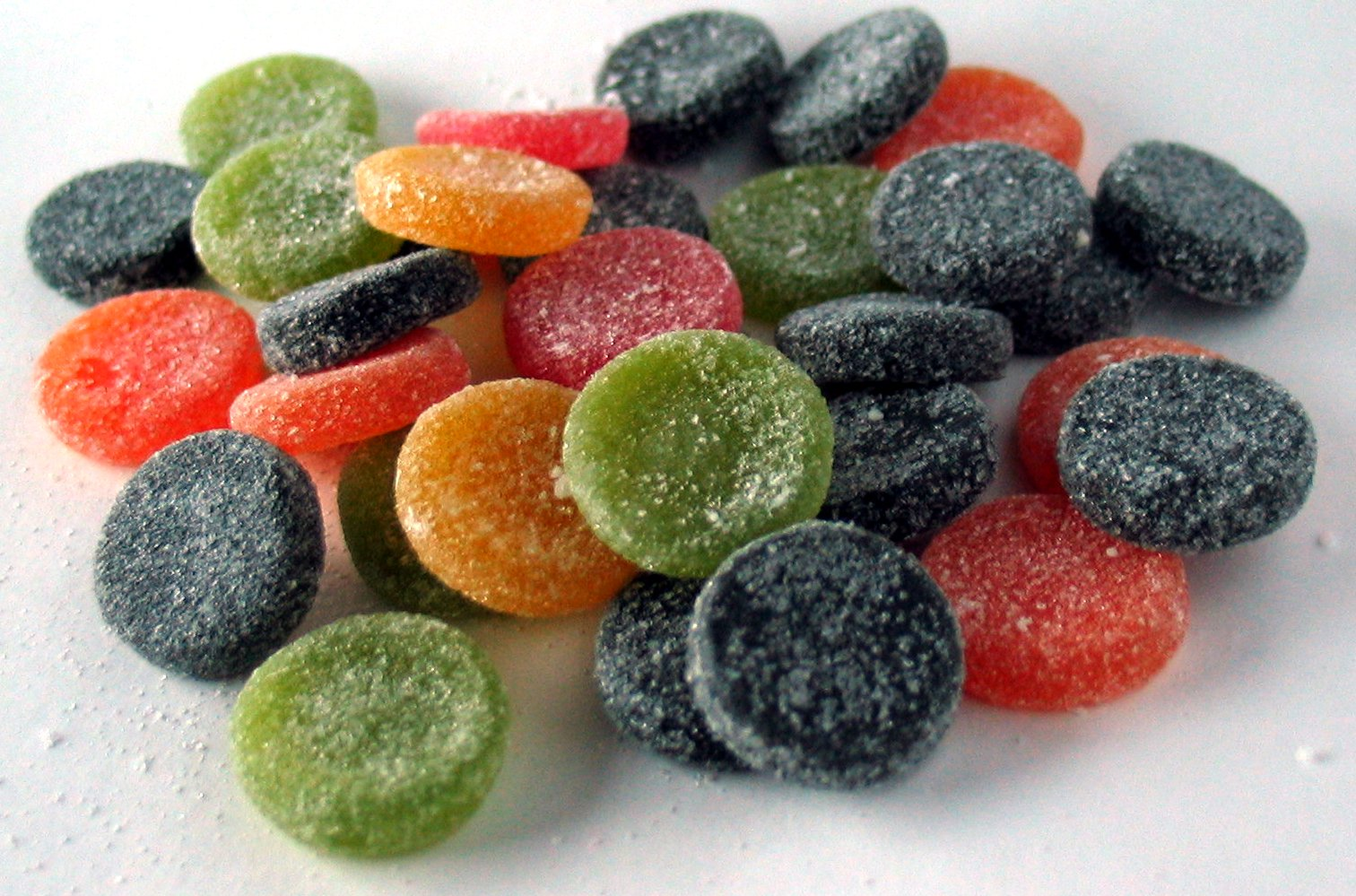
Pantteri is a popular brand of candies by Fazer.

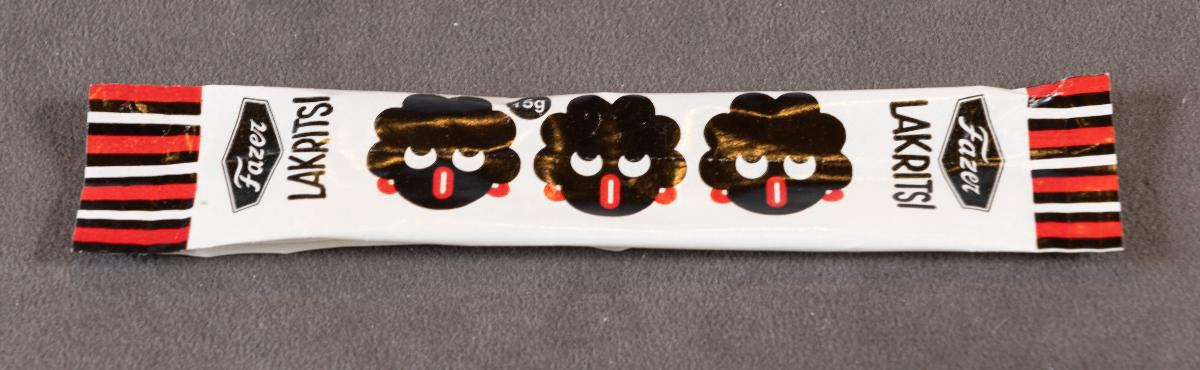
Fazer's former licorice bar

- Pihlaja (1895)
- Mignon (1896)
- Kiss-Kiss (1897)
- Fazer Liqueur Fills (1900)
- Finlandia (1902)
- Wiener nougat (1904)
- Tokyo (1908, formerly known as Geisha)
- Vihreät kuulat (1908, formerly known as Päärynäkuulat)
- Orange (1910, formerly known as Appelsiini)
- Islanti (1910)
- Da-Capo (1916)
- Taloussuklaa (1917)
- Eucalyptus (1919)
- Fazer Blue (1922)
- Lakta (1926)
- Laku-Pekka (1927)
- Avec (1929, formerly known as Ranskalaiset pastillit)
- Fazerin Parhain -makeissekoitus (1935)
- Tosca (1936)
- Dumle (1945 in Sweden, 1985 in Finland)
- Pax (1947–1991, resumed production in 2007)
- Marianne (1949, by Chymos)
- Rex (1950)
- Fazerina (1953)
- Amerikan pastillit (1953)
- Jim (1958)
- Fami (1960–1986, resumed production in 2007)
- Pantteri (1961, by Chymos)
- Kina (1961)
- Geisha (1962)
- Suffeli (1966)
- Omar (1966, by Chymos)
- Fazermint (1969)
- Merkkari (1973)
- Kismet (1974)
- Tyrkisk Peber (1977)
- Pätkis (1978)

=== Fazer Lifestyle Foods ===
The Lifestyle Foods division produces other food items, such as Froosh smoothies, Fazer Aito oat products and non-dairy drinks as well as Frebaco and Fazer Alku oat-based breakfast foods. These are produced in Lahti, Lidköping and Koria.

== See also ==
- CloettaFazer AB
- Kalev (confectioner)
