= Parma violet =

Plant cultivar group

Parma Violet
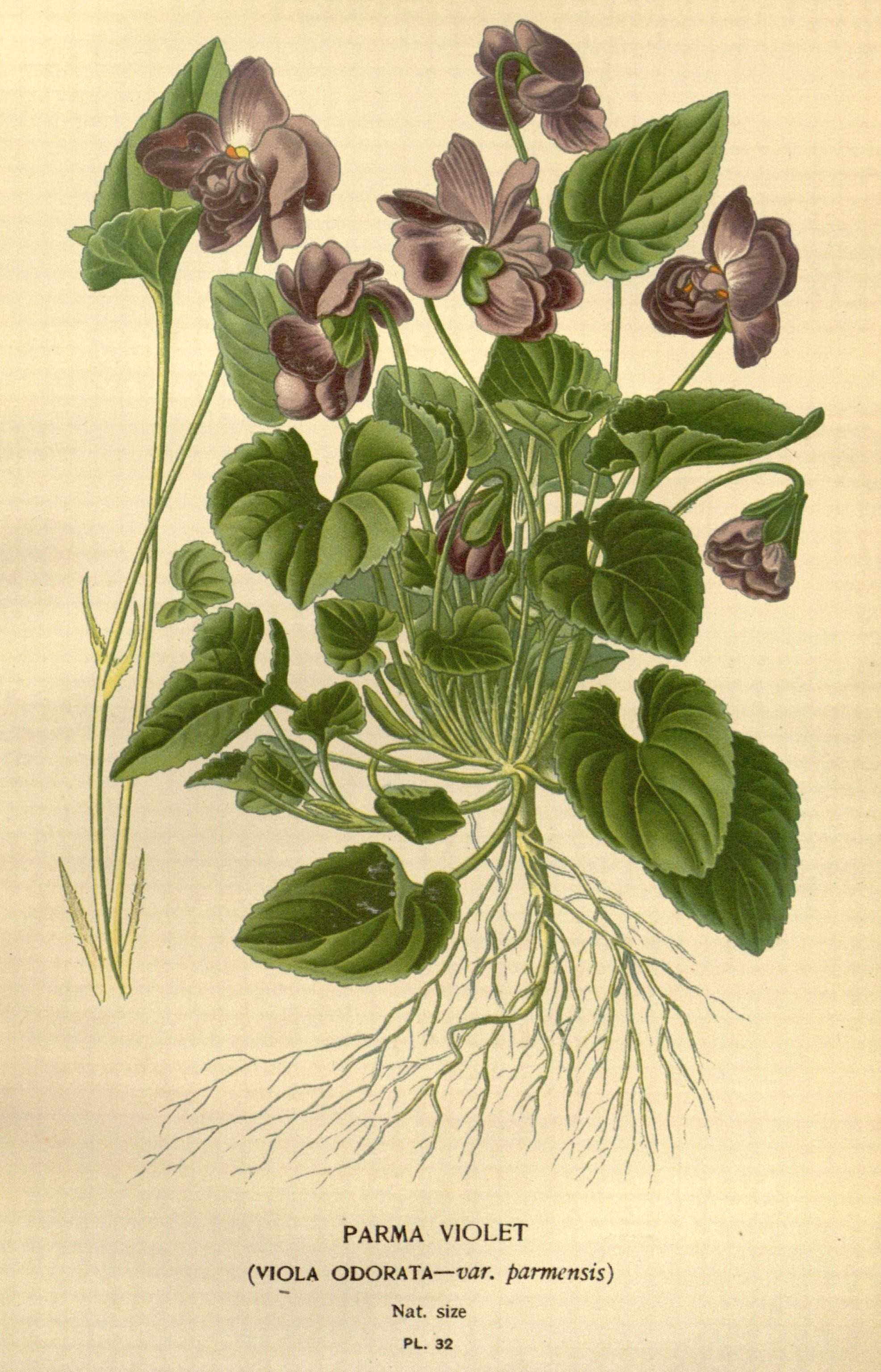
- Illustration, 1896
- Species: Viola alba
- Cultivar group: Parma Violet
- Origin: Mediterranean region

Parma violets belong to the more exotic branch of the violet family. First appearing in Italy, in the 19th century, most types of parma violets have lavender flowers of varying sizes, which have an attractive fragrance.

The origins of the parma violet are unknown, though they have been shown to be derived from two different Viola alba strains, and more closely resemble, in flower colour and odour, Viola odorata. It was first imported into Naples in the latter part of the 19th century, when Filippo Savorgnan di Brazzà took the plant to Udine. There are no records of his work, though it is widely believed that he deliberately crossbred to produce at least two varieties of parma. One of these is still available, whereas the other has been lost.

Parma violets are widely believed to be sterile, and there is much store laid by their reproduction through cuttings. Armand Millet, a French violet grower, proved this belief to be a myth, however, and with the right conditions any sturdy violet could well produce a seed pod.

Parma violet is a deepish shade of violet descriptive of these flowers.

The delicate purple flowers of the parma violet plant also give their name to a delicate, violet-scented sweet Parma Violets, manufactured by Swizzels Matlow.
