= SweeTarts =

Sweet and sour candies

SweeTarts

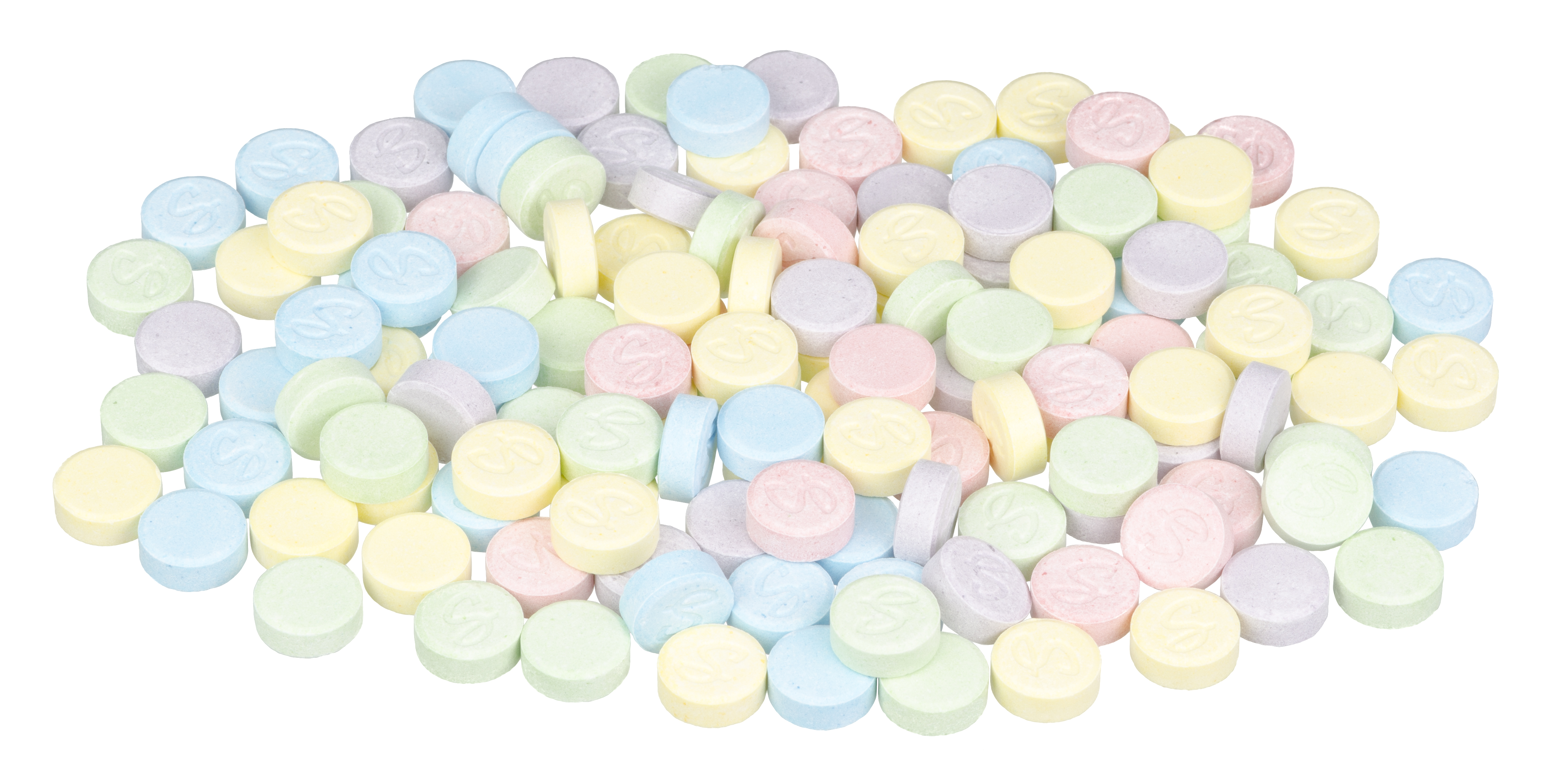
SweeTarts

SweeTarts (/ˈswiːt.tɑːrts/; officially stylized as SweeTARTS) are sweet and sour candies invented under the direction of Menlo F. Smith, CEO of Sunline Inc., in 1962. The candy was created using the same basic recipe as the already popular Pixy Stix and Lik-M-Aid (Fun Dip) products, all of which are currently manufactured by Ferrara Candy Company, a division of Ferrero.

== History ==
In 1963, SweeTarts were introduced with the same flavors as the popular Pixy Stix: cherry, grape, lemon, lime, and orange. Taffy products are also produced with the SweeTarts brand.

Sunline, Inc., became a division of the Sunmark of St Louis' group of companies, which was later acquired in 1986 by Rowntree Mackintosh of the United Kingdom, which was, in turn, taken over by Nestlé. The Willy Wonka brand candies were developed by Sunmark in a joint venture with The Quaker Company. Sunmark eventually acquired the rights to Willy Wonka and established a division with that name which produced the Willy Wonka brands. The Wonka symbol was subsequently applied to most Sunmark brands. Nestlé has since sold its confectionery businesses to Ferrero SpA.

In 2022, SweeTarts sponsored the TikTok Film Festival in an attempt to reach out to members of Generation Z due to its declining popularity.

== Related products ==
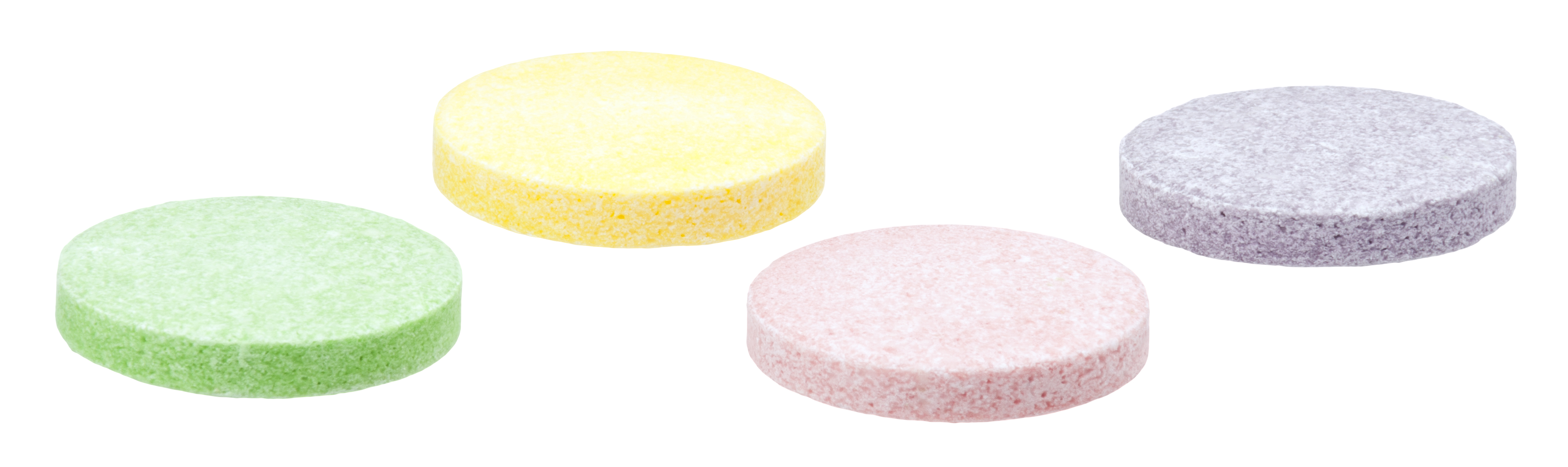
Giant Chewy SweeTarts

SweeTarts also come in a variety of other products including gum.

Little Sweet Tarts (often packaged to be handed out as Halloween trick-or-treat candy), SweeTart "hearts" for Valentine's Day, "chicks, ducks and bunnies" shaped SweeTarts for Easter and SweeTarts Jelly Beans (marketed for Easter in some regions of the US), "skulls and bones" for Halloween.

In the mid-1960s, Sunline introduced GianTarts, originally packaged as a single large 1/2" thick tablet and changed in the mid-1970s to two thinner discs of the same diameter. In the 1980s, GianTarts were repackaged as three slightly-smaller discs and joined by Chewy Sweetarts, marketed in the same "giant"-sized three-pack. GianTarts were discontinued through 1994–1996

In the 2000s, Wonka rebranded Chewy SweeTarts as Giant Chewy SweeTarts, repackaged as four slightly-smaller discs. These were re-launched in 2021 with an expanded line of Chewy SweeTarts products, including sugar-coated Chewy SweeTarts and Mini Chewy SweeTarts. These twenty-first century Chewy SweeTarts are the same size as standard roll candies.

In 2015, SweeTart Ropes Bites, a bite-sized variant of SweeTart Ropes was released. Flavors of these include such as orange, strawberry, green apple, cherry, and punch.

== Flavors ==
- Red: Cherry
- Purple: Grape
- Blue: Fruit Punch
- Orange: Orange (retired as of 2013)
- Green: Apple (Lime before 2002)
- Yellow: Lemon (retired in 2009, returned in 2013)

== See also ==
- Smarties
- Love Hearts
