= Sherbet (powder) =

Fizzy powdered confectionery

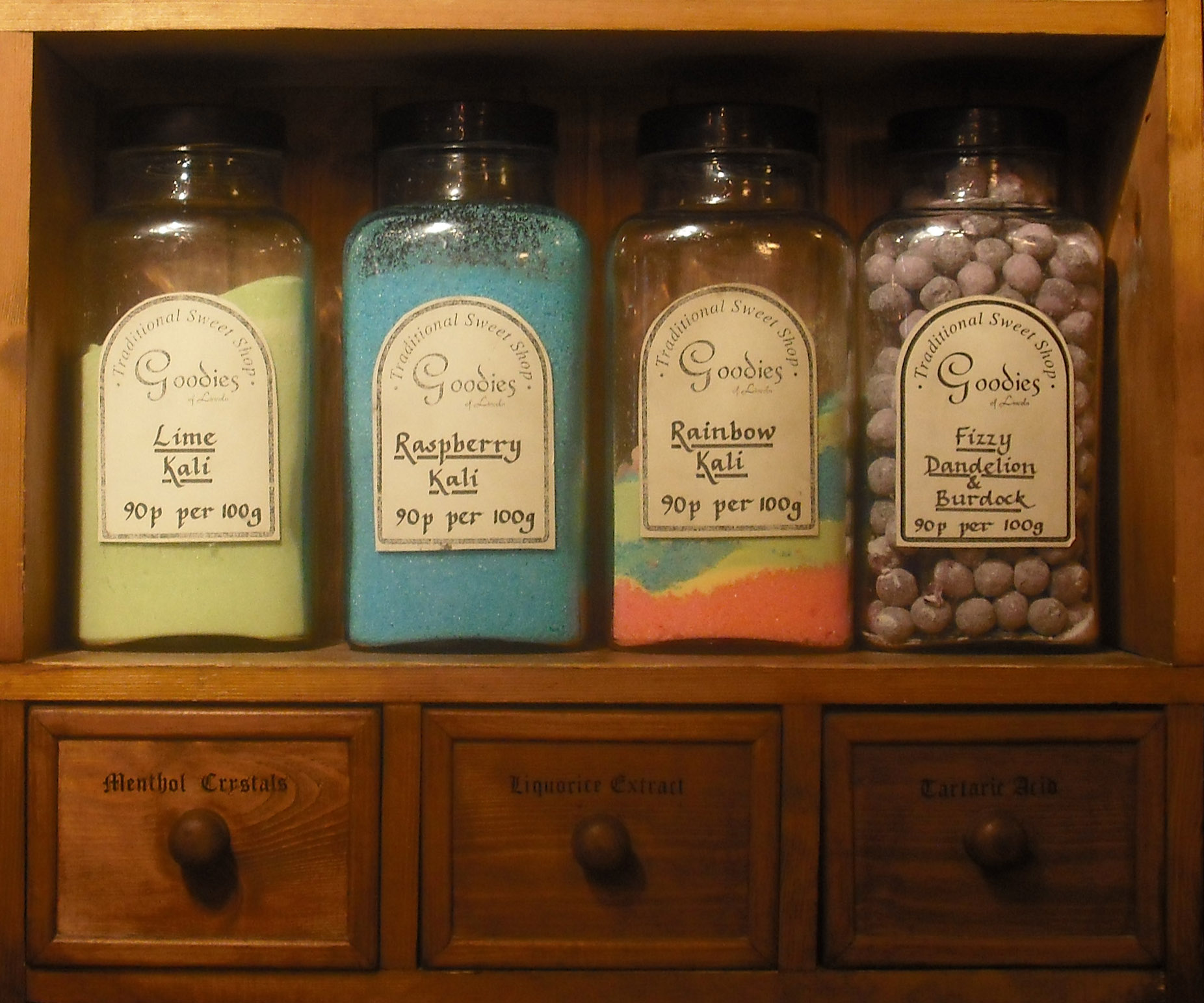
- Jars of colourful sherbet powder in a sweet shop
- Alternative names: Sherbert, Soda powder
- Type: Confectionery
- Place of origin: England
- Main ingredients: Sugar, flavouring, edible acid and base

Sherbet, also called Sherbert, is a fizzy, sweet powdered sugar, usually eaten by dipping a lollipop or liquorice stick, using a small spoon, or licking it from a finger.

== Etymology ==
The word sherbet is from Turkish şerbet, which is from Persian شربت, which in turn comes from "sharbat شربات", Arabic شَرْبَة sharbah, a drink, from "shariba" to drink. The word is cognate to the words 'syrup' and 'shrub' (Turkish şurup, meaning drinking vinegar) English. Historically it was a cool effervescent or iced fruit soft drink. The meaning, spelling and pronunciation have fractured between different countries.

== History ==
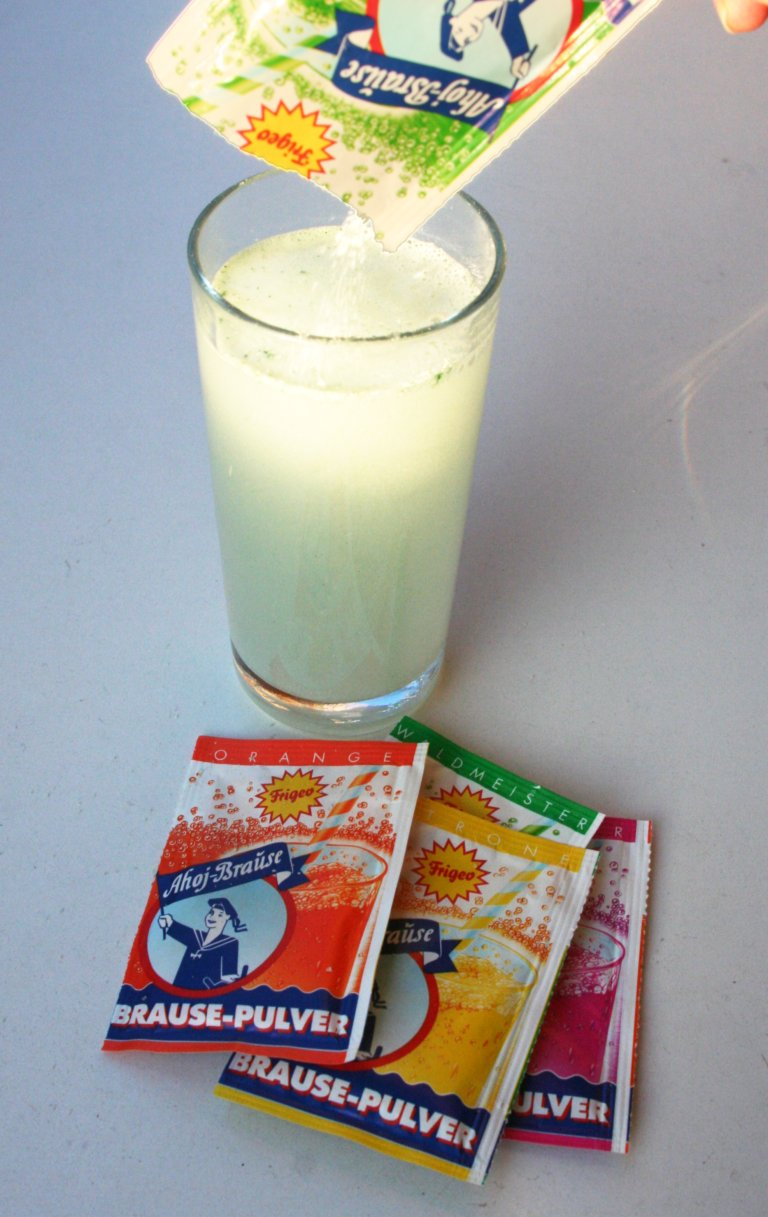
German Brausepulver is similar, and while originally sold as such is often not mixed with water nowadays but eaten by children by dipping a wet finger into it, or by adults in combination with vodka.

Beginning with the 19th century sherbet powder became popular, with John Richards (of The Strand, London) in 1816 claiming to be the inventor of Richards' effervescent Portable Sherbet Powder - just add water for a refreshing drink.

"Put a spoonful of the powder in a cup of water, mix it and drink it as soon as possible, during the time of sparkling. ... Because this way the most of acid of air is lost ... it is more practicable to put the powder into the mouth and flush it with some water." 2 g of sodium bicarbonate and 1.5 g of tartaric acid were separately packed in little coloured paper bags.

Sherbet used to be stirred into various beverages to make effervescing drinks, in a similar way to making lemonade from lemonade powders, before canned carbonated drinks became ubiquitous. Sherbet is now used to mean this powder sold as a sweet. (In the United States, it would be somewhat comparable to the powder in Pixy Stix or Fun Dip, though having the fizzy quality of effervescing candy, such as Pop Rocks.)

== Ingredients ==
Sherbet in the United Kingdom and other Commonwealth countries is a fizzy powder containing sugar and flavouring and an edible acid and base. The acid may be tartaric, citric or malic acid, and the base may be sodium bicarbonate, sodium carbonate, magnesium carbonate or a mixture of these and/or other similar carbonates. To make the flavour more palatable, a variable amount of sugar (depending on the intended sourness of the final product) is added, as well as fruit or cream soda flavouring. The acid-carbonate reaction occurs in the presence of moisture (juice/saliva), producing gas and thus becoming fizzy.

== Products ==
Sherbet can be sold by itself or used as a decorative agent on other sweets. The measured qualities of sherbet include granularity, colour, "zing" (acidity) and flavouring (normally a citrus fruit).

=== Sherbet lemon ===
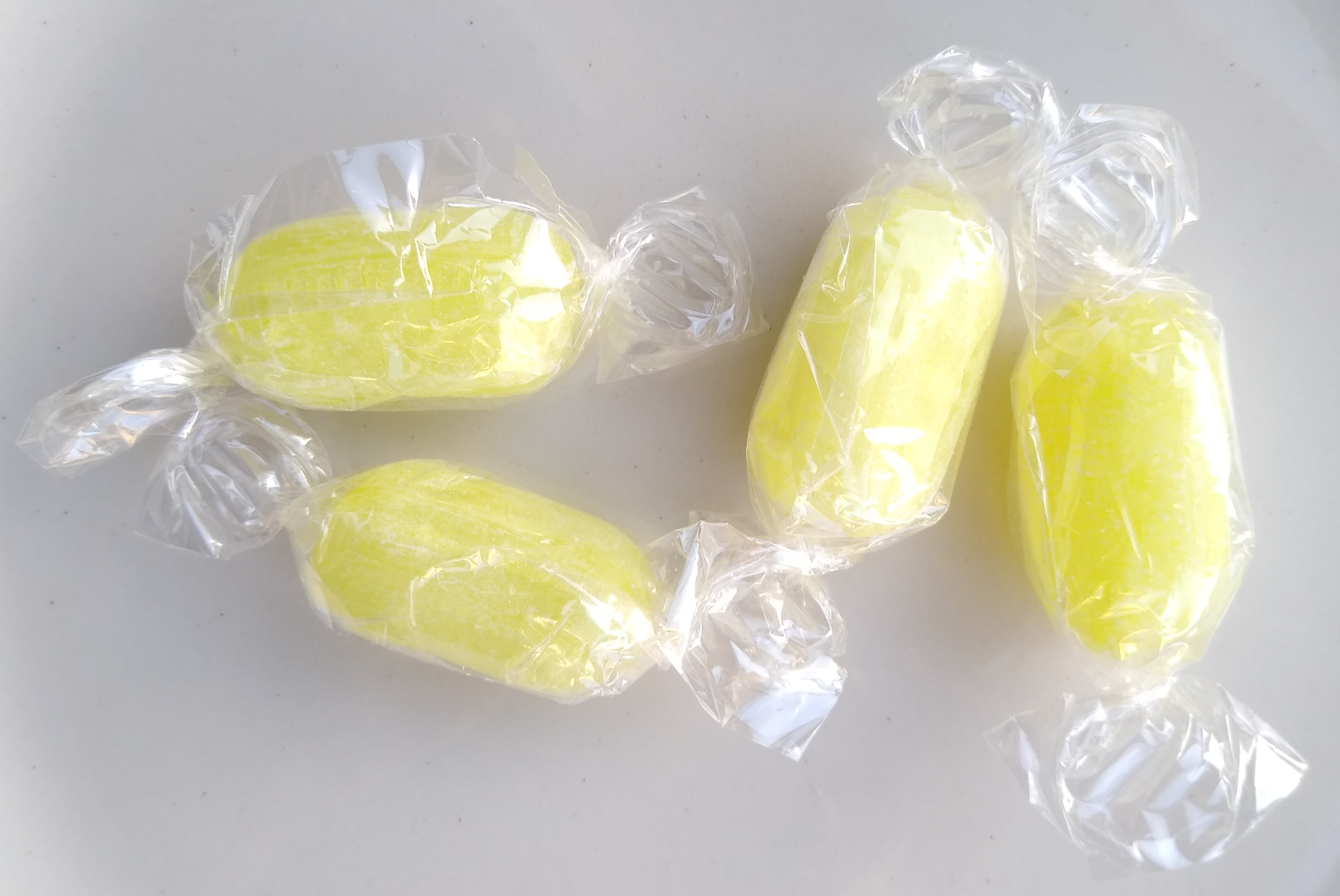
Sherbet lemons

Sherbet lemons are a popular sweet in the UK, and are sold in most sweet shops and supermarkets. They are boiled sweets which have an intense lemon flavour with powdered sherbet centres. Variants, such as sherbet fruits including sherbet limes, strawberries, blackcurrants, raspberries and orange are all popular flavours. The sherbet lemon has a strong citrus taste and is sour and tangy. The sherbet in the middle releases, giving a sensation of extreme lemon bittersweet with fizzy light tangy crisp sour.

A similar candy, made in Italy and popular in the United States, is Zotz, a brand sold in various fruit flavours.

=== Sherbet Fountain ===
Traditional version of Barratt's Sherbet Fountain

Barratt's Sherbet Fountain consists of a 25g-tube of sherbet with a liquorice stick and has been sold since 1925. An alternative version consists of a strawberry-flavoured hard gelatine candy stick, which is red in colour. The original concept of the sherbet fountain was sold to Barratt's by Henry Edward Brunt and rebranded under their name.

In the traditional paper packaging the top of the stick was intended to be bitten off to form a straw and the sherbet sucked through it, where it fizzes and dissolves on the tongue. The "new" format includes only a solid liquorice stick, so the sherbet must be licked off that or eaten direct. This method of consumption was also considered acceptable with the original packaging, which has since been replaced with a solid plastic tube to improve the product's freshness and shelf life. This is advertised on the packet as "sherbet with a liquorice dip".

=== Flying saucers ===
Flying saucers are small dimpled discs of colored wafer paper, typically filled with white unflavoured sherbet (the same form as in Sherbet Fountains). The first flying saucers were produced in the 1950s in Belgium.

== Slang ==
Sherbet has been used in parts of both the UK and Australia as slang for an alcoholic drink, especially beer. This use is noted in a slang dictionary as early as 1890, and still appears in lists of slang terms written today (especially lists of Australian slang). "We're heading to the pub for a few sherbets" – meaning "... pints of beer." It also was used as a euphemism for cocaine.

== See also ==
- Sharbat (Middle Eastern drink)
- Italian ice
- Sorbet
- Pixy Stix – a popular brand of dextrose-rich sherbet powder manufactured by Ferrera
- Fun Dip – another powder made by Ferrera, in a different format
- Swizzels Matlow – a notable manufacturer of sherbet products
- Pop Rocks – a similar confection that pops and fizzes in contact with saliva
- Zotz (candy) – a candy with a hard exterior and an interior filled with fizzy powder
