= Wonka Gummies =

Line of gummy sweets

Wonka Gummies are a line of gummy sweets made by The Willy Wonka Candy Company. They were launched in 2009 and are available in 5.5 oz (160 g) bags. The Sluggles, Puckerooms, Wingers, and Sploshberries were previously marketed as coming from Wonka's edible garden, up until November 2010.

== Varieties ==
=== Sluggles ===
Sluggles come in an orange packet, are shaped like slugs, snails, caterpillars and worms and are flavoured in orange, lemon, strawberry and grape.

=== Sour Puckerooms ===
Sour Puckerooms come in a green packet, are coated in sugar (to give a sour taste) and are shaped like mushrooms. They come in cherry, grape and lemon-orange flavours.

=== Whipped Wingers ===
Whipped Wingers come in a blue packet, and are each flavoured in a fruit variety and shaped like a flying insect. Watermelon gums are shaped like ladybirds, orange gums are shaped like butterflies, pineapple gums are shaped like bees, and tropical punch flavoured gums are shaped like dragonflies.

=== Squishy Sploshberries ===
Squishy Sploshberries come in a red packet, have foamy bottoms, are fruit-shaped and contain a ‘splosh’ of juice inside each one. They come in blueberry, raspberry, goji berry and cloud berry.

=== SweeTarts Gummies ===
Several products have been released under the SweeTarts brand.

- SweeTarts Gummies – these are shaped like the regular SweeTarts candies, coated in sugar and coloured in pink, orange, green, blue, purple and yellow.
- SweeTarts Bugs Gummies – these gummies are shaped like bugs (worms, snails, butterflies, spiders, etc.) and coated in sugar.
- SweeTarts Hearts Gummies – these are coated in sugar and coloured either pink, purple or both (half-and-half)
- SweeTarts Bunnies Gummies – these are coated in sugar and are in the same colours as regular SweeTarts gummies, only shaped like rabbits.
- SweeTarts Holiday Gummies – these holiday-specific candies are coated in sugar, coloured red and green, and are shaped like Christmas trees, snowmen, stars, bells, stockings, etc.

=== Randoms ===
Randoms are the most recent variety of gummy candies by Wonka. Some are just normal gummies, others have whipped marshmallow bottoms, and others are jam-filled. They feature 70 shapes, including monkeys, roller skates, unicorns, mustaches, musical instruments, and bicycles. They come in seven flavors: cherry, grape, orange, strawberry, citrus, lemon, and raspberry.

== See also ==
- List of confectionery brands
