= Acidus =

Acidus, a Latin adjective meaning sour, tart or acid, may refer to:

== See also ==
- Acida (disambiguation)
- Acidum (disambiguation)
