= Pixy Stix =

American candy brand

A packet of small Pixy Stix

Pixy Stix are an American sweet and sour colored powdered candy usually packaged in a wrapper that resembles a drinking straw.

== Usage ==
The candy is lightly poured into the mouth from the wrapper, which is made out of either plastic or paper. Pixy Stix contain dextrose, citric acid, and artificial and natural flavors.

== History ==
Pixy Stix were invented by Sunline Inc. in St. Louis, Missouri. The concept for this powdered candy originated in 1942 and was derived from a penny drink mix sold as Fruzola Jr. by the Fruzola Company in Salt Lake City, Utah. When J. Fish Smith found that children were eating the sweet and sour powder straight from the package, he modified the formula and branded it as Lik-M-Aid.

An affiliated company, Fruzola Company of St. Louis, which later became Sunline, Inc., was founded in 1952 by Menlo F. Smith to manufacture and market Lik-M-Aid nationwide. In 1959, the product was packaged in color-striped straws and introduced as Pixy Stix. Several years later, Lik-M-Aid was modified with a multi-compartment package containing two flavors and a candy stick used to dip the candy out of the package, thereby dubbed Fun Dip. Pixy Stix are currently manufactured by Ferrara Candy Company, a division of Ferrero SpA.

In 2011, Pixy Stix was one of the candies considered a health threat by a Grand Rapids middle school, and was banned out of concern that children could use the candy to learn the habit of using illicit drugs. For example, middle schoolers commonly snort the candy to mimic snorting cocaine. Inhaling the powdery candy also could increase the risk of upper sinus and upper respiratory system infections.

== Flavors ==
- Grape Escape
- Maui Slap/Punch (Blue Raspberry)
- Orange
- Cherry
- Strawberry
- Cucumber Watermelon
- Mango Lime
- Pineapple Monkey
- Tangerine Twist

== See also ==
- Sherbet – a fizzy powder similar to that found in Pixy Stix
- Ronald Clark O'Bryan – a man who murdered his 8 year-old son using a poisoned Pixy Stix
- Apollo (candy) – a similar South Korean candy
- Double Dip – a UK candy like Fun Dip, except with three powder-filled compartments instead of two.
