= Double Dip (confectionery) =

Candy brand of flavored powders to eat with an included stick

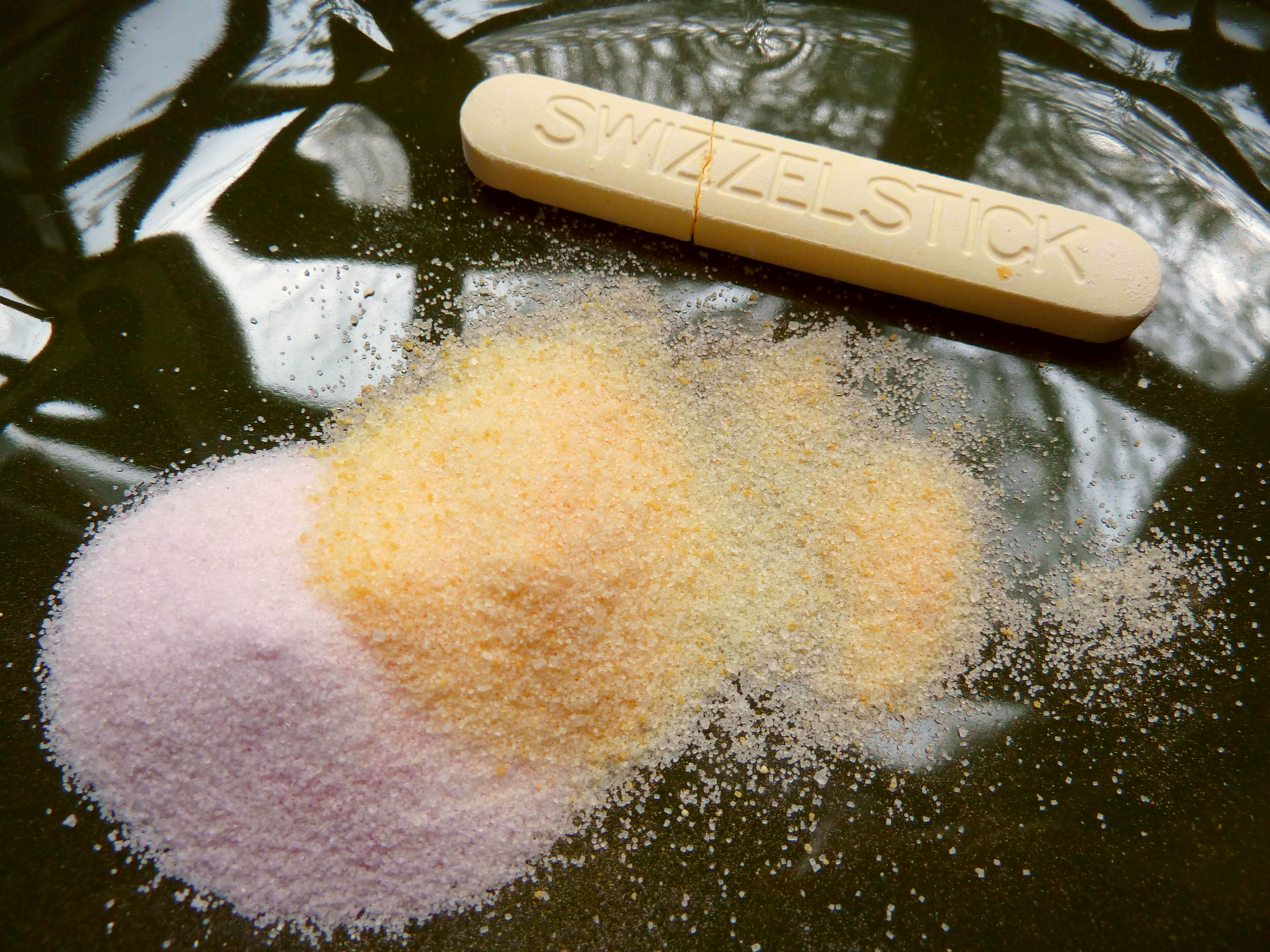
- Swizzelstick and sherbet in cherry and orange
- Type: Confectionery
- Place of origin: United Kingdom
- Main ingredients: Sherbet (powder)
- Variations: Cola
- Food energy (per 100 g serving): 1580.1kJ/371.8
Nutritional value
(per 100 g serving)
- Protein: 0.0 g
- Fat: 0.5 g
- Carbohydrate: 93.6. g
- Similar dishes: Fun Dip
- Other information: Nutrition information is per 100g (One packet = 19g). Ingredients include 1.1g salt. Suitable for vegans.

Double Dip is a confectionery produced by Swizzels Matlow, where it has been popular in the United Kingdom, Australia and Germany. Towards the end of the 1980s Double Dip hit its peak of popularity when the sherbet based confection became the best selling sweet in Ireland.

== Product description ==
Double Dip consists of a sachet of two sherbet powders (orange and cherry flavoured), with a "swizzelstick" for dipping.

=== Ingredients ===
The sweet is suitable for coeliacs, vegans and vegetarians. The manufacturer gives the ingredients as "sugar, dextrose, acidity regulators, citric acid, malic acid, cornflour, sodium bicarbonate, modified starch, stearic acid, anticaking agent, magnesium carbonate, magnesium stearate, flavourings, colours: beetroot red, curcumin, lutein."

== Development ==
The idea for the product came from the company's desire to create a product that was distinct, unique, and interactive.

Since the release of Double Dip, a cola flavour has been added. It started as a one off in a few packets, and then a special edition, and has since become a normal sachet in the packets.

== See also ==
- Fun Dip, a similar product in the U.S. and Canada
- Sherbet Fountain a similar product substituting a liquorice stick, manufactured by Barratts
- Dip Dab, another similar product by Barratts this time using a strawberry flavored lollypop
- List of confectionery brands
