= Acidum =

Acidum, a Latin adjective meaning acid, may refer to:

- Acidum aereum, a Latin name of carbon dioxide
- Acidum mephiticum, a Latin name of carbon dioxide
- Acidum Salis, the Latin name of hydrochloric acid
- Acidum tannicum, the Latin name of tannic acid

== See also ==
- Acida (disambiguation)
- Acidus (disambiguation)
