= Menlo F. Smith =

American businessman (born 1927)

Menlo F. Smith (born January 9, 1927) is a prominent St. Louis businessman. He has also been a leader in the Church of Jesus Christ of Latter-day Saints (LDS Church) both in St. Louis and in the Philippines. He is also a benefactor of Brigham Young University (BYU) and the founder of Enterprise Mentors International (EMI), now known as Mentors International.

Smith was born in St. David, Arizona, where his father was the school superintendent. Shortly after this the family moved to Texas where his father pursued a degree in agricultural economics from Texas A&M University. Later they lived for a time with his grandparents in Colorado and then moved to Salt Lake City where his father, J. Fish Smith, was the co-owner of a company producing a fruit drink mix called Frutola. Later they changed the product name to Lik-M-Aid and marketed it as candy. Smith began working for the company in 1936.

He graduated from the University of Utah. There he met and then married Mary Jean Jacobson. They became the parents of five children. She died in 2011.

After graduating from college Smith moved to St. Louis. There he founded the Sunmark Corporation in 1952. They transformed Lik-M-Aid into Pixy Stix. Shortly afterward he used equipment at the Tums factory where his neighbor worked to reprocess his candy as SweeTarts. Over the years Smith's company grew. While he was in the Philippines from 1982 to 1985, the team ran the company for him. After he returned, he began to think he wanted to go into venture capitalism. In 1986, he sold the company to a British firm, Rowntree Mackintosh Confectionery.

Smith was a great-grandson of Jesse N. Smith. However, his parents were not active in the LDS Church and Smith was not a member. In the 1960s, the social unrest caused him to feel there was a need for more stability. He was baptized into the church in 1972.

During the 1980s, Smith served as president of the LDS Church's Philippines Baguio Mission. There he saw many people living in poverty and suffering from having to borrow money at rates at times as high as 300%. After ending his service as a mission president, he reached out to discuss the issue with Dallin H. Oaks. Oaks got him in touch with BYU's business school, and later Smith and Warner Woodworth decided to work together to address this issue. Smith and Woodworth formed EMI as a development and micro-credit organization. Besides helping people in the Philippines, it has also helped people start small businesses in numerous Latin American countries, as well as in Africa.

From 1997 to 2000, Smith was the first president of the LDS Church's St. Louis Missouri Temple. He has also served in the church as a regional representative and a bishop.

Smith served as a member of the board of directors of the Mercatus Center of George Mason University.

Smith is also a donor to BYU and recognized as one of the founders of the Center for Entrepreneurship of its Marriott School of Business.
