= Parma Violets =

Confectionery

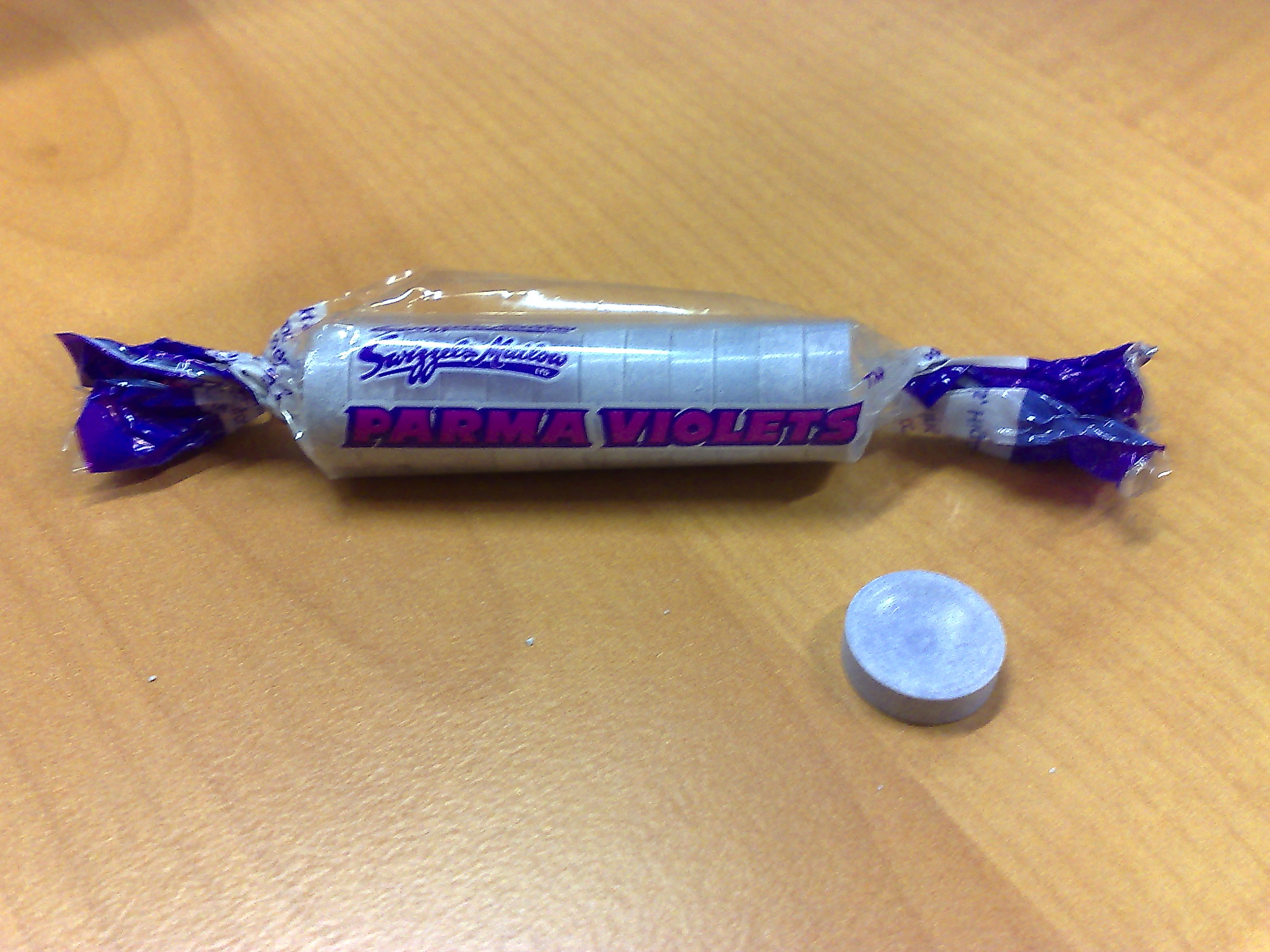
Parma Violets (small size)

Parma Violets are a British violet-flavoured tablet confectionery manufactured by the Derbyshire company Swizzels Matlow, named after the Parma violet variety of the flower. The sweets are hard, biconcave discs, similar to the Fizzers product from the same company but without their fizziness. Swizzels Matlow have also released a line of Giant Parma Violets.

Ingredients include sugar, stearic acid, modified starch, glucose syrup, and anthocyanin.

== Precursors ==
The petals of violets have long been used in herbalism for their medicinal properties, even mentioned by Dioscorides. "Violet tablets", sugary lozenges flavoured with violets, were made before 1620. During the eighteenth century, crushed violet petals, rosewater, and sugar were combined to make an early type of confectionery known as flower pastry. These could be used for flavouring a cake, or moulded into pastils and eaten as sweets. In the Edwardian era, violet-flavoured chocolate and liquor were used to relieve sickness.

== Description ==
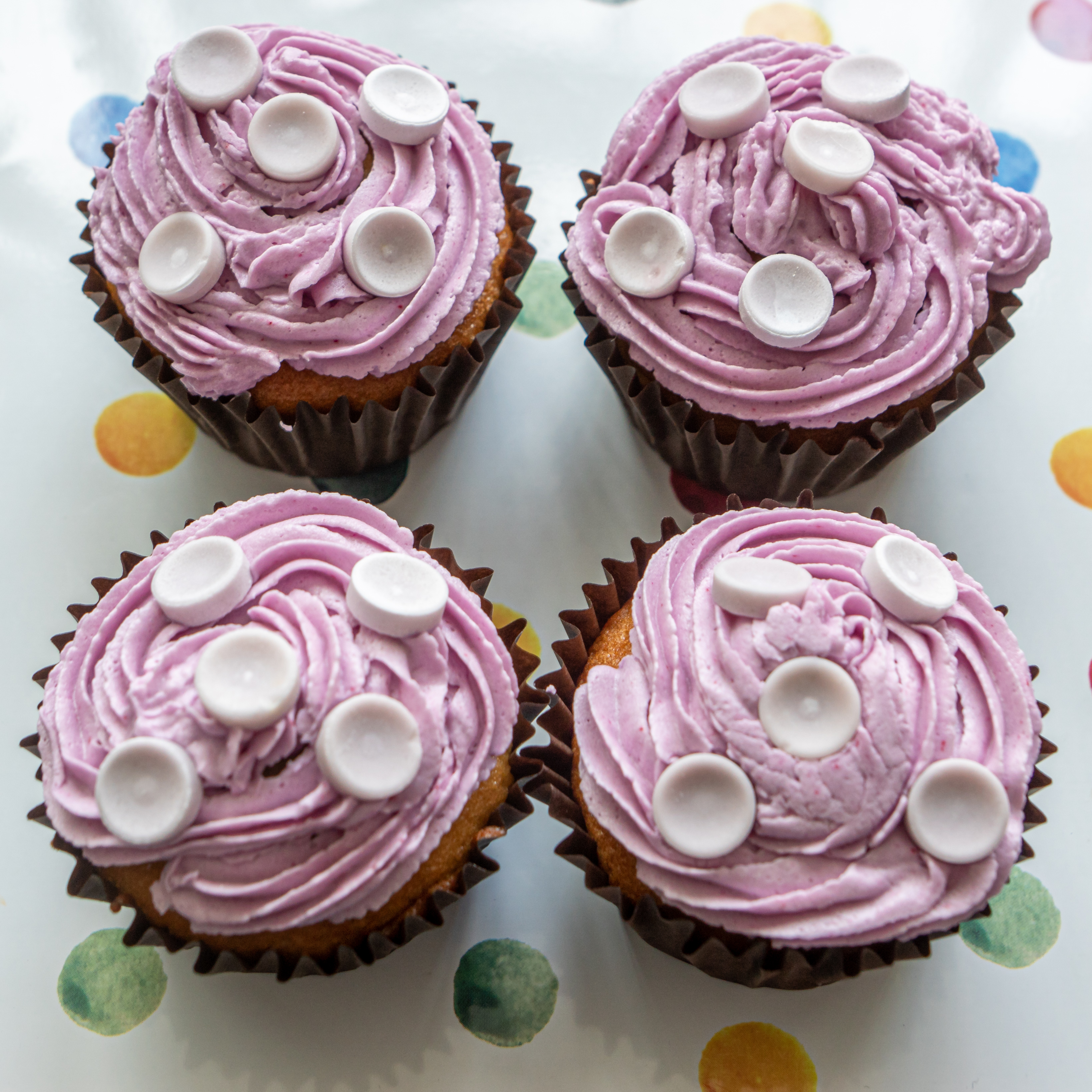
Parma Violets cupcakes made with Swizzels cake mix. The vanilla fairy cake is topped with parma violet flavoured buttercream, and topped with the sweet itself

Parma Violets were created in 1946 by the Derbyshire company Swizzels Matlow. They are sweets that are hard, biconcave discs, based on similar aniseed confectionery traditionally consumed in India after a spicy meal. Their flavour has been described as sweet with a soapy or floral taste. The current recipe includes sugar, stearic acid, modified starch, glucose syrup, and anthocyanin.

In 2016, Swizzels Matlow released a special Parma Violets flavoured cheese, produced by the Cheshire Cheese Company to celebrate their seventieth birthday. Cocktails that replicate the flavour of the confectionery are also available in some UK bars. In 2019, Somerset cider company Brothers Cider launched a Parma Violet-flavoured cider. Also, large bags of Parma Violets can be purchased from the official website in sizes up to 3 kg along with other online retailers.

== In popular culture ==
- In Ian Fleming's James Bond series, hard candies very similar in description to Parma Violets are the favourite sweet of the supervillain Ernst Stavro Blofeld due to their breath freshening properties.
- The name of the British Indie pop band Palma Violets is derived from the Matlows confectionery. Irish singer Naomi Hamilton also released an album in 2016 named after the sweet.
- A 2005 survey reported by The Guardian revealed Parma Violets to be the least popular childhood sweet among its adult respondents.
- In British Pop Artist Stuart Semple's 'potion' paint line, Purple Haze is claimed to be Parma Violet Candy Scented.

== See also ==
- List of confectionery brands
