= David Sunflower Seeds =

Snack brand for sunflower seeds

David Sunflower Seeds, also known as DAVID Seeds, is a brand of roasted and salted sunflower seeds produced by ConAgra Foods in the United States.

== History ==
The company was founded in 1926 by Armenian-American David Der Hairabedian of Fresno, California. Der Hairabedian first roasted sunflower seeds in his grocery store and packaged them in individual servings for a nickel. Eventually, his two sons, Ara and Aram, joined him in marketing the seeds to other retailers.

David was later owned by Sunmark, Rowntree Mackintosh Confectionery, and Nestlé. Conagra Brands acquired David & Sons from Nestle USA in December 2001.

== Products ==
- Sunflower Seeds with Shells
- Pumpkin Seeds
- Sunflower Seeds without Shells
- Trail Mix

== Flavors ==
- Original – JUMBO seeds
- Bar-B-Q – JUMBO seeds
- Ranch – JUMBO seeds
- Nacho Cheese
- Jalapeño Hot Salsa – JUMBO seeds
- Original with Reduced Sodium -JUMBO seeds
- Dill Pickle – JUMBO seeds
- Hot and Spicy – JUMBO seeds
- Bacon Mac & Cheese - JUMBO seeds
- Spicy Queso - JUMBO seeds
- Franks RedHot - JUMBO seeds
- Buffalo Style Ranch – JUMBO seeds
- Cracked Pepper – JUMBO seeds
- Sweet & Salty – JUMBO seeds
- Sweet & Spicy - JUMBO seeds
- Lightly Salted – Simply Seeds
- Black Pepper – Simply Seeds
- Sour Cream & Onion – Simply Seeds
- Sour Cream & Onion – Jumbo Seeds
- Bacon Mac & Cheese - Simply Seeds
- Honey Roasted - Jumbo Seeds

== Discontinued ==
- Chili Lime - JUMBO seeds

== Babe Ruth League and DAVID Seeds ==
Since 1991, DAVID Seeds has sponsored the Babe Ruth League, pitching the “Eat. Spit. Be Happy!”(slogan) message to youth baseball and softball players ages 5 to 18 nationwide. The Babe Ruth League has over 900,000 players in 45,000+ teams across the U.S..

As the “Official Sunflower Seed of the Babe Ruth League,” DAVID provides free scorebooks and safety tips to each team in the league, awards to All-Star players, and DAVID Sunflower Seeds to be sold at concession stands.

== Slogans ==
- Eat. Spit. Be Happy!
- Lets Get Cracken!
