= Apollo (candy) =

South Korean candy brand

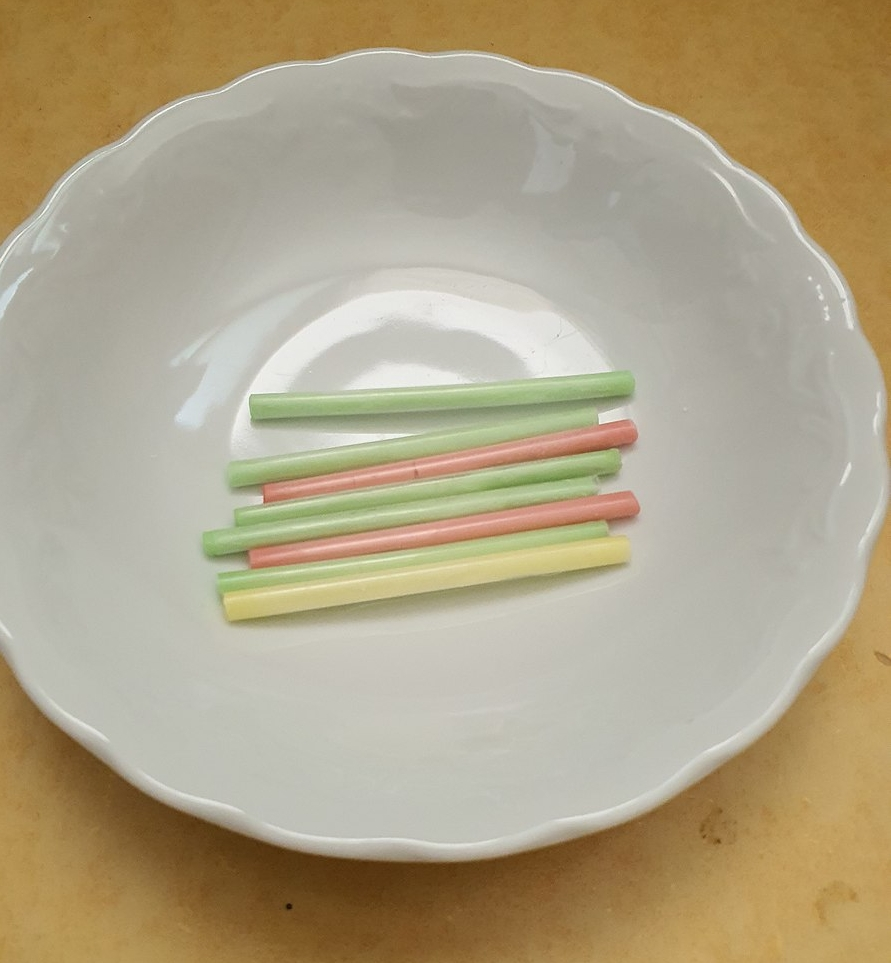
A number of Apollo straws of various flavors in a dish

Apollo (Korean: 아폴로), marketed in the Middle East, South America, and Southeast Asia as CC Stick, is a South Korean candy product. It consists of a number of small, short straws that are filled with flavored sugar powders. Example flavors include strawberry, green apple, pineapple, and blueberry.

== History ==
The candy was invented in 1969 by Kim Sang-gyu (김상규). In 1965, he founded the company Woolim Confectionary (우림제과). One of his popular products was powdered juices. When inventory of powdered juice began to pile up, he came with the idea to package and sell the powder in straws (the original straws had a wider diameter originally, and were filled manually). He tested the product on his children, who loved it. He then named the product after the American Apollo lunar program, which was then landing men on the moon around that time. The product quickly achieved significant popularity, leading him to change the name of his company to Apollo Confectionary (아폴로제과) in 1971. The product saw a boom in sales in the late 1990s, during the 1997 Asian financial crisis. In 1997, a similar product called "Apache" (아팟치) began to be produced by a different company.

The food is now popular for its nostalgia value. A journalist writing for the Weekly Chosun noted that while the snack should be cheap, it is often priced much higher in retail stores based on this value and its relative rarity. However, it was easily purchasable online by 2008.

=== Closure and re-release ===
By 2008, sales of the candy were slowing, and the cost of production significantly rose. The owner expected to close the business within two years. The snack ceased to be produced by 2010, and the company was closed by January 2013. However, another South Korean company began distributing the product in 2011. They have the product manufactured by a Chinese company (Korean: 광동백성식품) and shipped to South Korea, in order to lower costs. The packaging and product changed; the original logo featured a girl, but the current packaging features a boy. While old packages contained only a single flavor, the new packages contain a variety of flavors in a single bag.

By 2018, the product was also sold in the Middle East, South America, and Southeast Asia under the names "Sakeorun" (사커룬) or "CC Stick". This variant is labeled as halal. In 2018, the product was deemed a choking hazard by the Saudi Arabian Food and Drug Administration and banned from import into the country.

== Description ==
Each package of the snack consists of a number of multi-colored straws, where the colors correspond to their intended flavors. Flavors include strawberry, chocolate, banana, and grape. The food is reportedly seen as unhealthy; the son of the original inventor was reportedly embarrassed in his middle school years to tell others that his family made the product, because of the food's reputation.

== See also ==
- Jjondeugi – another South Korean nostalgia snack
- Kkoedori – another South Korean nostalgia snack
- Pixy Stix – a similar American product
