= Kkoedori =

South Korean snack food brand

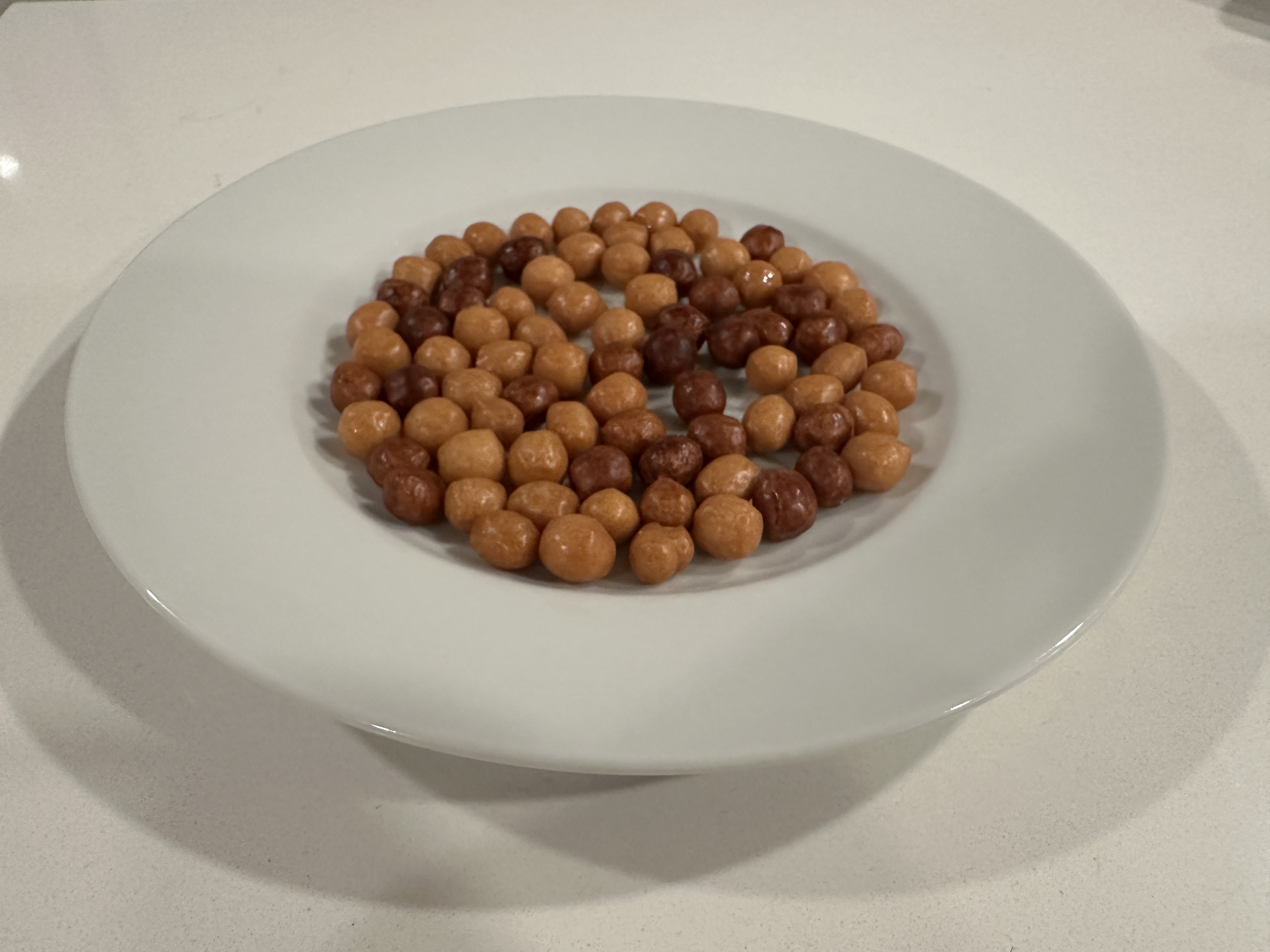
Kkoedori placed onto a plate

Kkoedori (Korean: 꾀돌이; lit. rascal) is a South Korean snack food product. Each packet of the food contains many crunchy chocolate-coated spheres, that are both savory and sweet. It has been produced since the mid-1980s, although it saw a significant resurgence in popularity by the 2010s, following a trend of younger people becoming interested in old South Korean snacks.

== See also ==
- Apollo (candy) – another nostalgia snack
- Jjondeugi – another nostalgia snack
