= Rainbow Drops =

Brand of confectionery

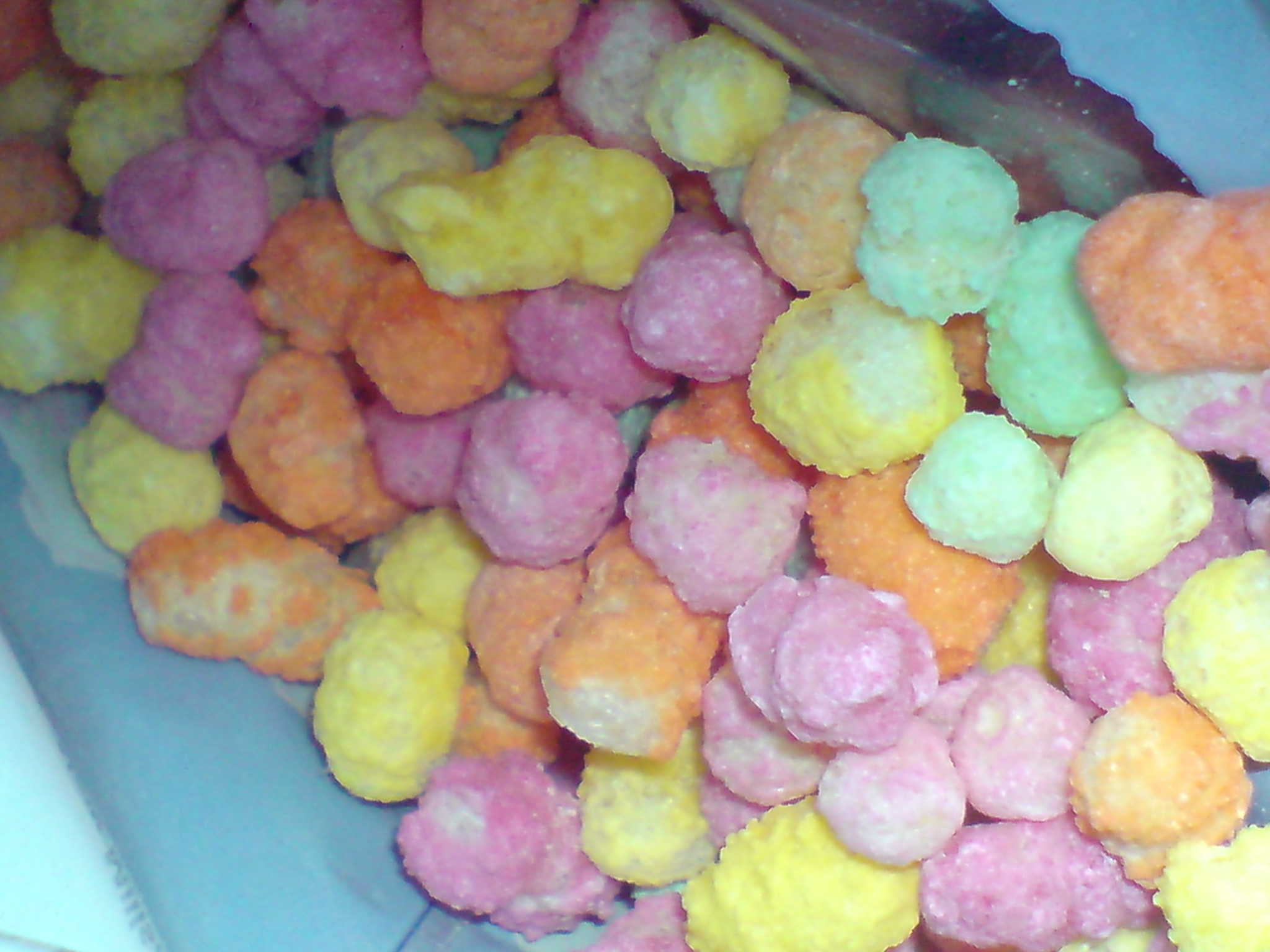
Close-up of Rainbow Drops

Rainbow Drops are a brand of sugar-coated cereal-type puffed maize and rice confectionery sold in both Ireland and the United Kingdom and produced by Swizzels Matlow. The sweets have an orange, pink, green and yellow coloured sugary coating and are sold in bags of 80 g, 25 g, 32g or 10 g. Rainbow Drops have gained cult status and have become widely regarded as retro sweets. Rainbow Drops are renowned for their scintillating appearance. Rainbow Drops were released in the early to mid-1930s and were originally sold loose, to be scooped into bags for 1 penny.

A fictionalized version of the candy is featured in the novel Charlie and the Chocolate Factory.
