= Sour Patch Kids =

Tart candy

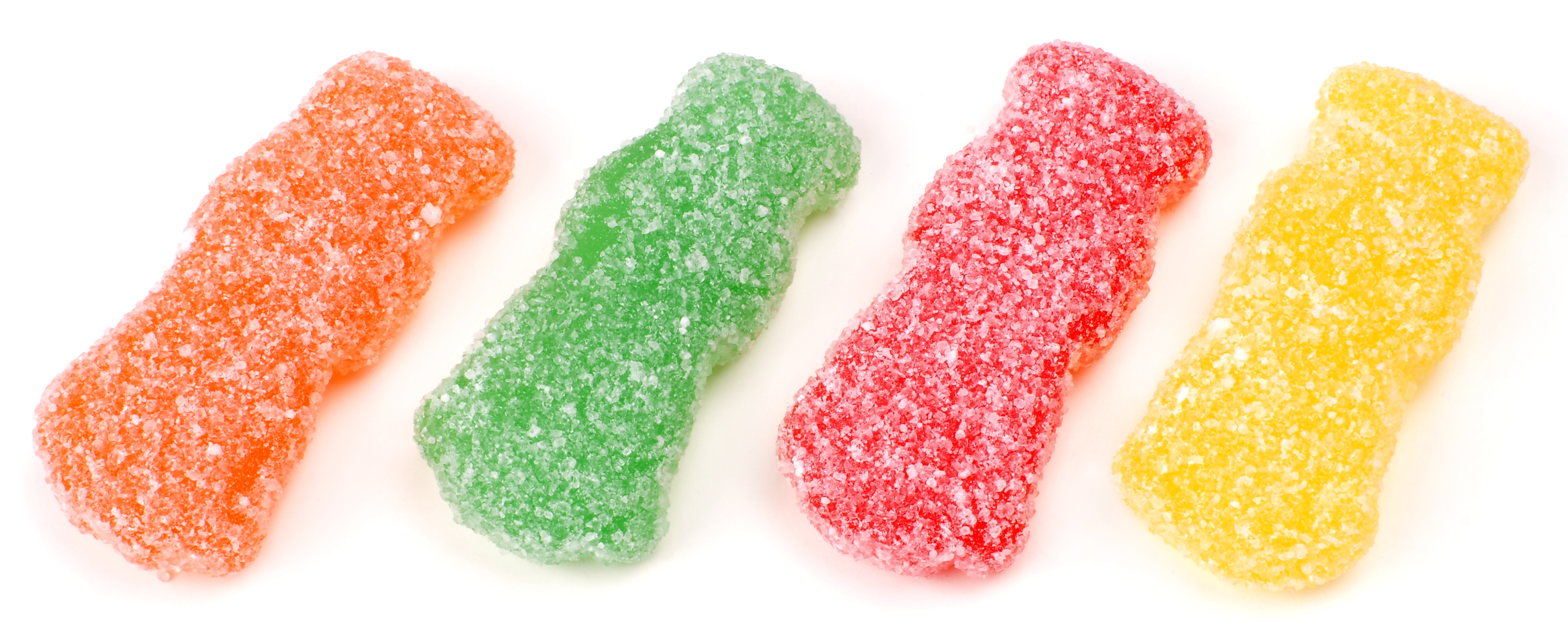
- Current owner: Mondelez International
- Introduced: 1970s (Canada); 1985; 41 years ago (US)
- Website: sourpatchkids.com

Sour Patch Kids (also known as Carambar Very Bad Kids in France, and previously known as Maynards Sour Patch Kids in Canada and the UK) are a brand of soft gummy candy with a coating of invert sugar and sour sugar (a combination of citric acid, tartaric acid, and sugar). The tartaric and citric acids provide the candy with a sharp burst of tartness, while the inverted sugar gives the soft gummy its sweet flavor. Sour Patch Kids Extreme, which contains malic acid in addition to the tartaric and citric acids, is considered the sourest variation in the Sour Patch line of candies. The slogans "Sour Then Sweet" and "Sour. Sweet. Gone." refer to the candy's sour-to-sweet taste.

== History ==
Sour Patch Kids were created in the early 1970s by Frank Galatolie while working as a confectioner at Jaret International. In the late 1970s, Cadbury and the Malaco Licorice Company formed the Allen Candy Company in Hamilton, Ontario to produce them. The candy were called Mars Men at that time. In the mid-1980s, the candy rebranded to Sour Patch Kids. Mondelez International currently handles production of the candy, following their acquisition of the Allen Candy Company in the late 1990s.

== Related products ==
=== Video game ===
World Gone Sour is a 2011 video game based on Sour Patch Kids. It was developed by Playbrains and published by Capcom. It was released on December 20, 2011, for PC, April 10, 2012, for PlayStation Network, and April 11, 2012, for Xbox Live Arcade (XBLA). It was delisted from platforms around 2015.

=== Other food products ===
In 2014, Sour Patch Kids gum became available.

In 2018, Dreyer's produced Sour Patch Kids-flavored ice cream, and J&J Snack Foods launched Sour Patch Kids-flavored ice pops.

Post released Sour Patch Kids cereal in 2018. The cereal is shaped like Sour Patch Kids candy and dusted with sour sugar, which dissolves in milk.

On May 6, 2024, Sour Patch Kids Oreos were released to store shelves, with colorful sour sugar inclusions in the cookie and creme.
