= Jjondeugi =

Chewy Korean snack

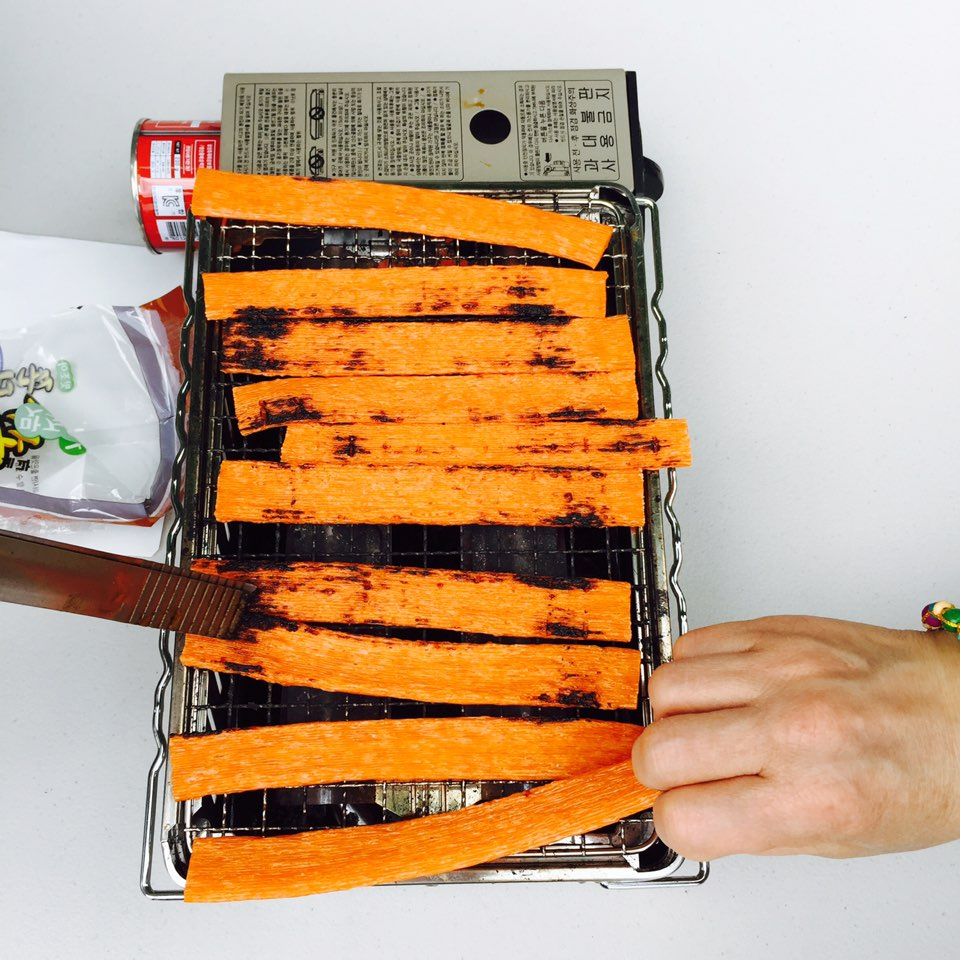
- Jjondeugi being grilled on a portable grill
- Place of origin: South Korea

Jjondeugi (Korean: 쫀득이, 쫀드기, or 쫀듸기) is a type of South Korean snack food that was popular around the 1960s to 1970s. It is a fried food made from a variety of ingredients, although namely wheat flour and corn starch. What is shared amongst the varieties is the chewy texture of the food; the food is even named after this chewiness ("쫀득거리다" means "chewy"). It is generally sweet or salty or both.

It was commonly sold in stationery stores near schools, and was popular as a cheap snack for students. The food has seen a resurgence in popularity as a nostalgia food.

It has a significant variety of flavors and regional varieties. Various brands for and flavors of the snack now exist. Flavorings include wasabi, glutinous barley, mugwort, mala, and even ramen soup powder. Sometimes there can be multiple flavorings on different parts of a single piece of jjondeugi for a varied eating experience.

It can be grilled in an oven, over a yeontan, or even in an air fryer. It has been described as an anju (food consumed with alcohol).

== Gallery ==
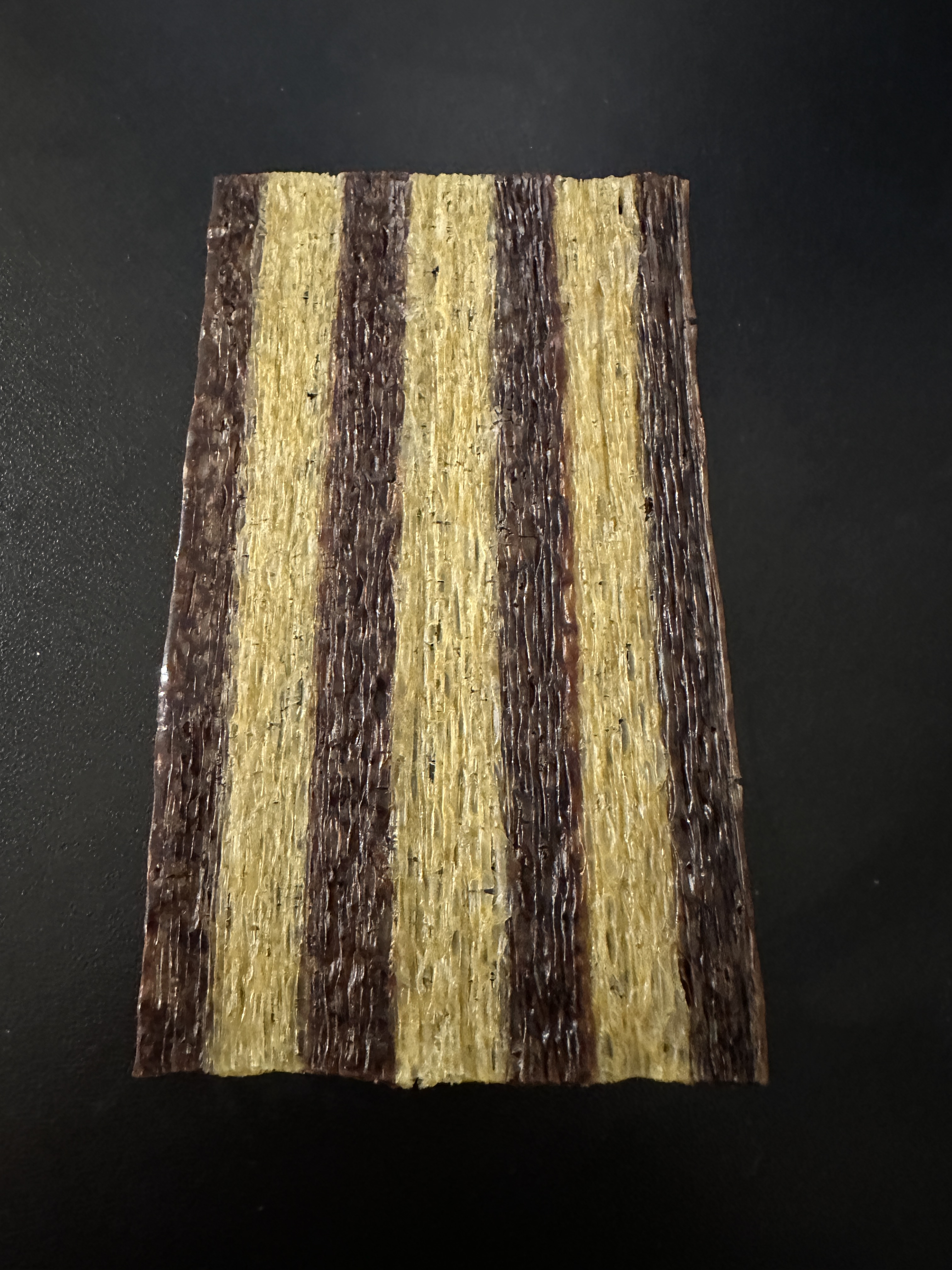
A "World Cup Flavor" piece of jjondeugi. The different colors correspond to different flavors.

== See also ==
- Korean cuisine
- Apollo (candy) – another South Korean nostalgia snack
- Kkoedori – another South Korean nostalgia snack
