= Sour sanding =

Food ingredient

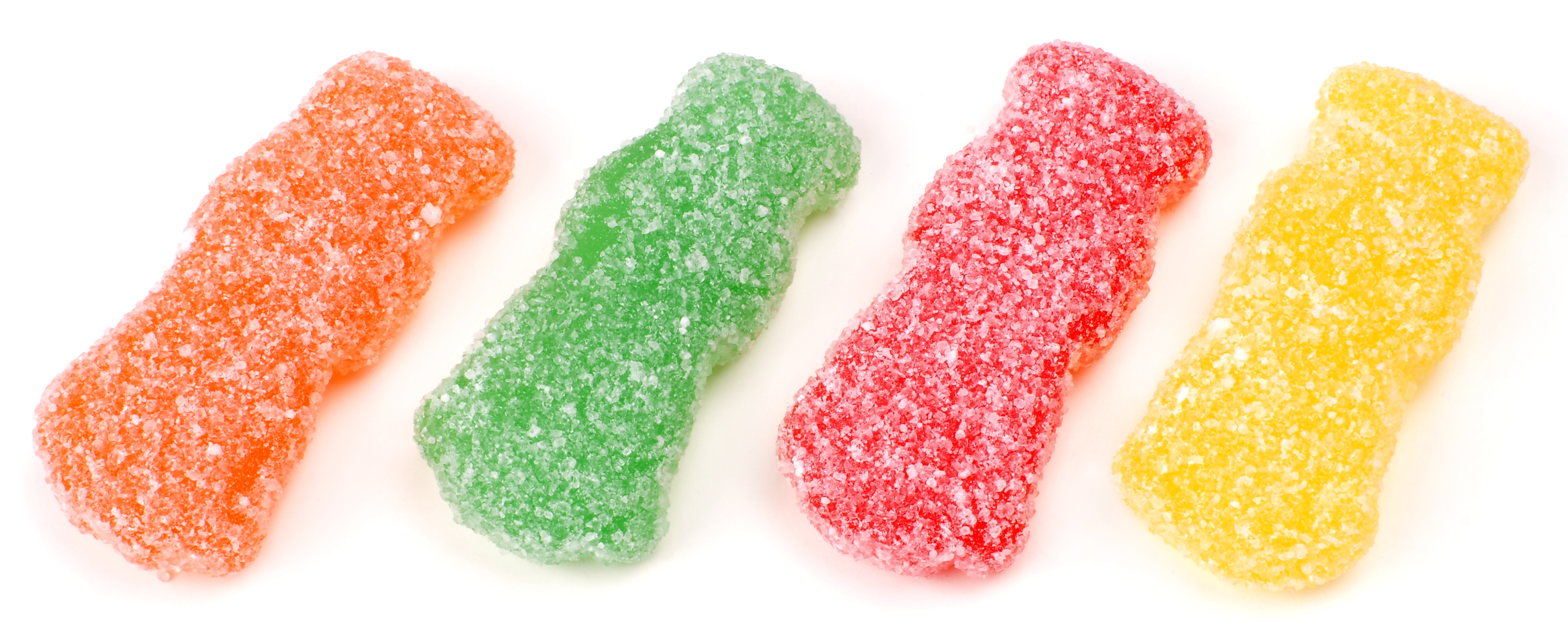
Sour sugar as seen on Sour Patch Kids candies

Sour sanding, or sour sugar, is a food ingredient that is used to impart a sour flavor to candy.

It is made from sugar along with citric acid, tartaric acid and malic acid.

It is used to coat sour candies such as lemon drops and Sour Patch Kids, or to make hard candies taste tart, such as SweeTarts.

== See also ==
- Acidulant
