= Zotz (candy) =

Candy brand

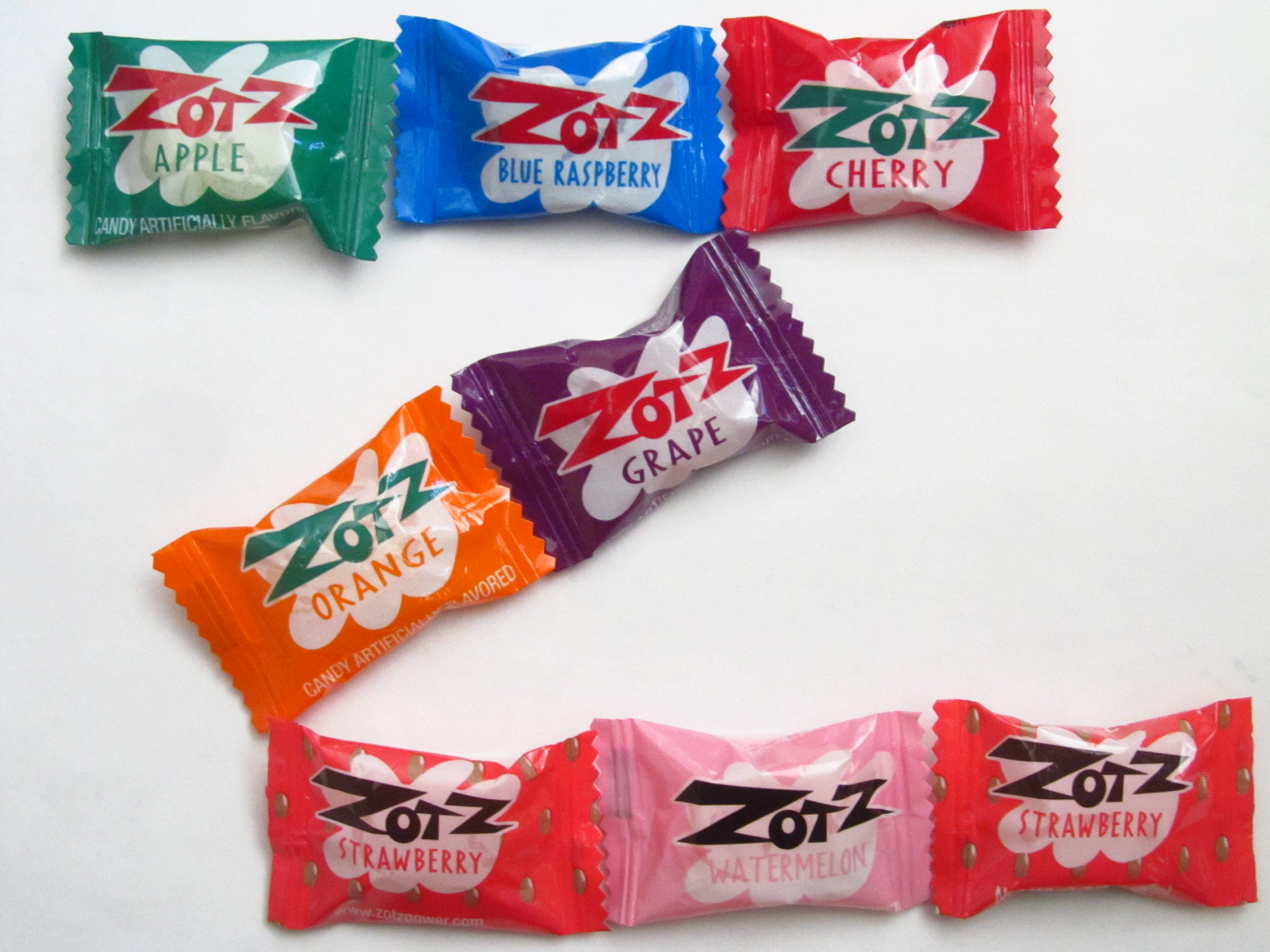
- Flavours of Zotz arranged to form a Z
- Product type: Hard candy
- Current owner: Frank Landry
- Produced by: G.B. Ambrosoli
- Country: Ronago, Italy
- Introduced: 1968 Italy, 1970 U.S.
- Markets: Italy, United States
- Website: https://zotzpower.com/

Zotz (/zɒts/ ZOTS) is a candy manufactured by G.B. Ambrosoli S.p.A. in Italy and distributed in the United States by Andre Prost, Inc. It is a fizzy, sour center hard candy that contains sherbet.

Zotz is the official candy of American Endurance Racing (AER).

== History ==
Zotz were introduced to the United States in 1970.

== See also ==
- Sherbet lemon
