= Sunmark Corporation =

Candy confectionery company

Sunmark Corporation (formerly Sunline Inc.) was a candy confectionery company based in St. Louis, Missouri. The company was founded by Menlo F. Smith in 1952 as an offshoot of the company owned by his father, John Fish Smith. They invented many candy brands, some of which are still produced today, such as Pixy Stix, SweeTarts, Spree, and Lik-M-Aid (now known as Fun Dip).

Originally called Sunline Incorporated, it changed its name to Sunmark, Inc. It subsequently acquired Breaker Connections in 1975 (makers of the Wonka Bar, Skrunch Bar, and Oompas) changing the acquisition's name to Willy Wonka Brands in 1980. Additionally, the Sunmark Companies became a parent company to the brands Sunline Brands, Sunfield Foods, and David & Sons, as well as other subsidiaries that supported its manufacturing and distribution functions. In 1983, Sunmark introduced Nerds. In 1986, it was acquired by Rowntree Mackintosh Confectionery of the UK, which was purchased by Nestlé in 1988. In 1993, Nestle renamed the company The Willy Wonka Candy Company. In 1999 they closed the corporate offices that had been in St. Louis. In mid-2006, many of Sunmark Co.'s last candy production plants, then owned by Nestlé, were shut down due to an overly competitive market.

In 2018, the Ferrara Candy Company, owned by the Ferrero Group in Chicago, Illinois, bought out Nestle USA's confectionery business.

Brands such as Pixy Stix, SweeTarts, and Fun Dip are now being produced by the Ferrara Candy Company.
