= Love Hearts =

Confectioneries with embossed messages

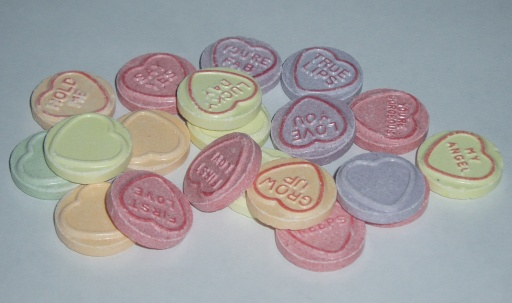
Love Hearts

Love Hearts are a type of confectionery manufactured by Swizzels Matlow in the United Kingdom. They are hard, tablet-shaped sweets featuring a short, love-related message on one side of the sweet. They are an updated version of Victorian-era conversation lozenges.

== History ==
Production of Love Hearts began in 1954, 26 years after the formation of Swizzels Ltd. The company was initially in factory premises at Star Lane, Canning Town, London, moving later that year to a larger premises at Drivers Avenue, Plaistow, London. During the Blitz in 1940, production relocated to a disused textile mill in New Mills, Derbyshire, where it is still located.

== Production ==
The production of the sweet is based on the pressed tablet method, similar to many pharmaceutical products. Granulated sugar is ground to a very fine powder and separated into lines for each flavour of Love Heart. Colours, flavourings, and other ingredients are added and mixed, then fed into a machine where it is compressed under high pressure. At this stage, the message is imprinted onto the front of the love heart. The front is then highlighted in a red food dye so the message is more legible on the sweet. After the highlighting, the different colours and flavours are randomly mixed and packaged to create a variety for the consumer.

== Description ==
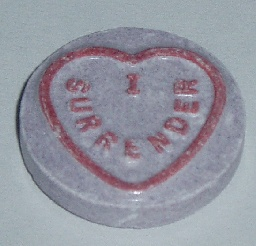
A Love Heart with the "I Surrender" message

The sweets are circular, approximately 19 millimetres (0.75 in) in diameter, and 5 millimetres (0.20 in) in height (including the embossed decorations). Both sides are embossed with a decoration, the rear with a large outline of a heart and the front with the message inside the outline of a heart. On the front of the sweet the embossing is highlighted with a red colouring. The main body of the sweet is in one of six colours: white, yellow, orange, green, purple or red. Upon chewing, the sweet disintegrates into a powdery, starchy consistency.

There are several messages which can be found on the front of the sweet, most of which are love-related, such as "Be Mine", "Love You" and "I Surrender". The message is written in capitals in a sans serif font of varying size. The font is scaled and sometimes stretched out of proportion to fit the available space. Most messages are written in simple horizontal, centrally aligned lines. There are some exceptions to this rule, including the phrase "I Surrender", where the word surrender has been written in an arc around the lower inside edge of the heart outline.

Wayne and Coleen Rooney had personalized sweets made for their wedding in the summer of 2008, which read "Wayne and Coleen". Special edition Love heart packs were launched for Prince William and Kate Middleton's wedding in 2011.

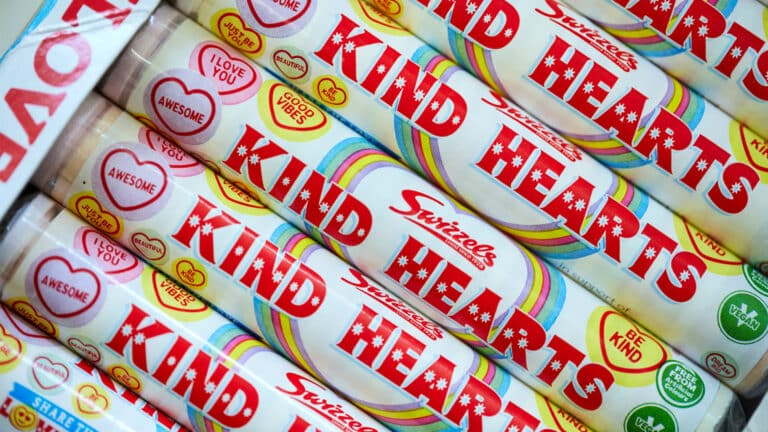
'Kind Hearts' Rebranded Packaging"

A competition was held by Swizzels Matlow Ltd for 10 new messages to be put on Love Hearts; the winning entries (announced on 22 July 2008) were "Think Pink", "Joyful Jo", "Granny P", "Me Julie Best Mum", "Juicy Jessie", "I Luv Alan", "Happy Harry", "Heart Baby", "Kin of U Home", and "Mermaid Eloise". These sweets first appeared in packs in September 2008.

In 2022, Swizzels temporarily rebranded Love Hearts as Kind Hearts as a collaboration with YoungMinds, a UK charity organisation. Kind Heart packs would include eight new messages:

"Be You", "You're Loved", "Dream Big", "Positive Vibes", "Respect", "Stay Strong", "Love Yourself", and "Be Kind".

== Packaging ==
The Love Hearts label

Love Hearts are packaged and typically sold in tubular packs of 20 (which are in turn boxed in packs of 50 for wholesale). The packaging is a clear plastic wrap (twisted at both ends) wrapped in a paper label. Alternative package sizes are available under special circumstances, such as the 2006 "silver love heart" competition, where the packet size was temporarily increased. Different sizes have also been released, including giant and small Love Hearts.

The label depicts the phrase "Love Hearts" bordered by two rows of stylized love hearts.

== Variants ==
UK supermarket Asda produce a brand of sweets called 'Whatevers', in the style of Love Hearts, but with a range of British colloquial terms. The sweets are also manufactured by Swizzels Matlow.

== See also ==
- Sweethearts (the US equivalent)
- List of confectionery brands
