= Fun Dip =

Candy brand

- Fun Dip Wrapper
- Alternative names: Lik-M-Aid
- Type: Candy
- Place of origin: United States, Canada
- Created by: Fruzola
- Main ingredients: Sugar
- Food energy (per 0.5 ounces sugar per spoon serving): .05 kcal (0.21 kJ)
Nutritional value
(per 0.5 ounces sugar per spoon serving)
- Protein: 0 g
- Fat: 0 g
- Carbohydrate: 13 g
- Similar dishes: Pixy Stix

Fun Dip is a candy manufactured by the Ferrara Candy Company. The candy has been on the market in the United States and Canada since the 1940s and was originally called Lik-M-Aid. It was originally manufactured by Fruzola, and then Sunline Inc., through their Sunmark Brands division. It was purchased by Nestlé in January 1989. Fun Dip was sold to Ferrero in 2018 along with other Wonka Candy Brands. It comes in many different flavors with candy sticks that are included.

Fun Dip is similar to another Wonka product Pixy Stix, but sold in small pouches, rather than paper or plastic straws. When called Lik-M-Aid, it consisted of 4 packets of flavored and colored sugar. When rebranded in the 1970s as Fun Dip, two edible candy sticks called "Lik-A-Stix" were added. While the original flavors consisted of lime, cherry and grape, the most common flavors are cherry, grape, and a blue raspberry/apple combination that turns from blue when dry to green when wet with saliva or water. It also comes in sour flavors, including sour watermelon, sour apple, and sour lemonade, as well as Tropical flavors, including watermelon sandía, mango, and strawberry fresa. There is also orange flavored Fun Dip. Since 2012, there has been an Easter edition known as Springtime Fun Dip, which includes the flavors of watermelon and strawberry. Packets with one stick and two flavors were once the standard, and packets with only one or two flavors are still available with less prominence than the now-standard three-flavor package.

== Gallery ==
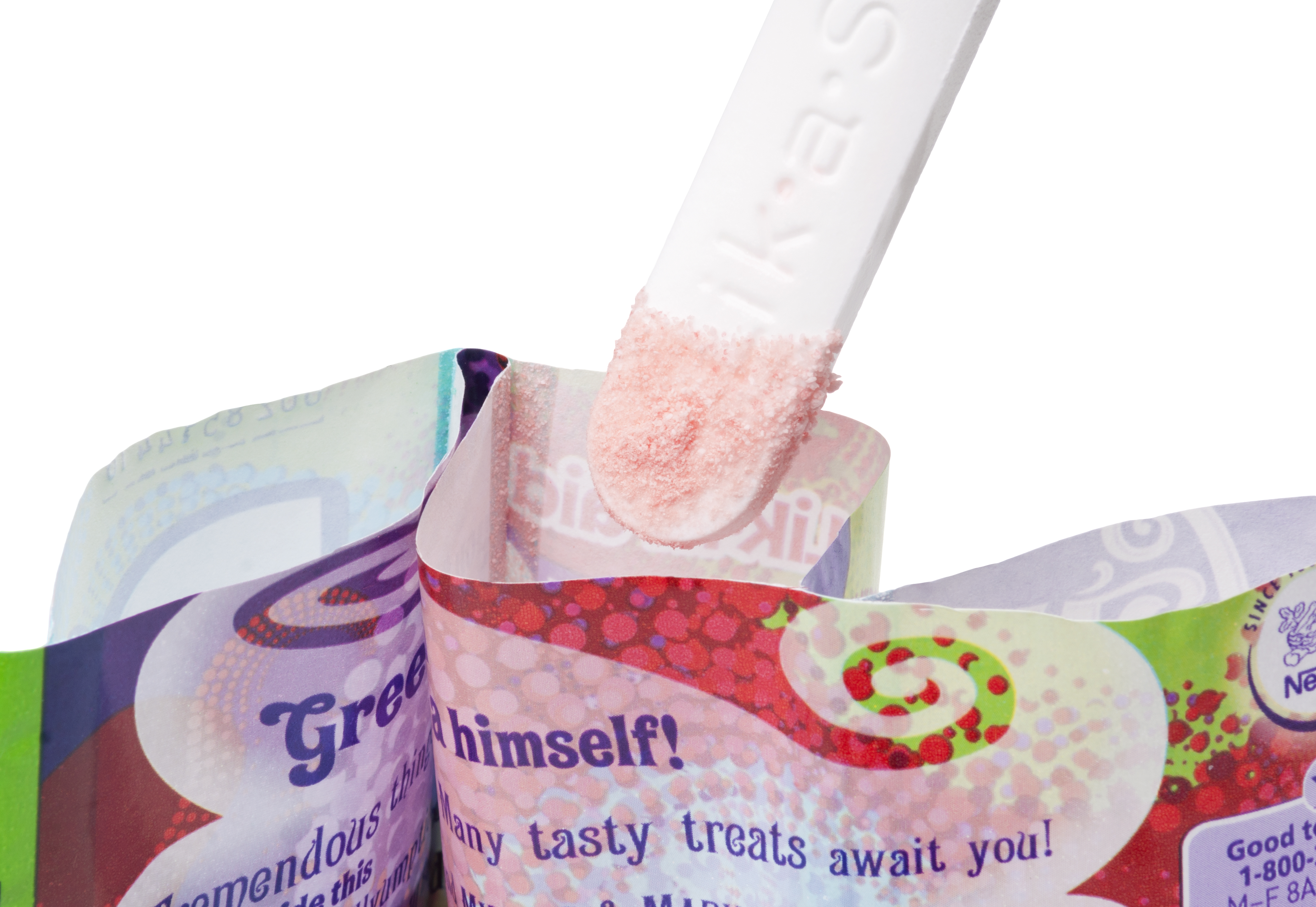
Flavored sugar sticking to the sugar stick

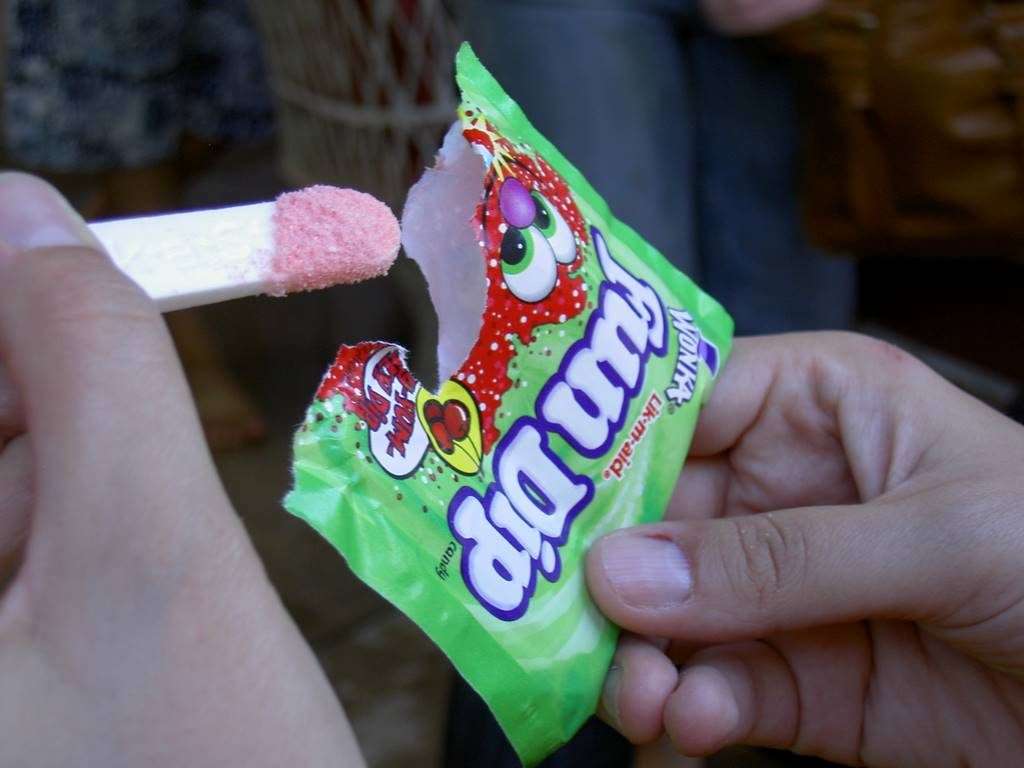
Dipping the sugar stick in the pouch

Original packaging and name

Fun Dip before Nestle acquisition

== See also ==
- Double Dip (confectionery), a similar product sold in the United Kingdom
- List of confectionery brands
