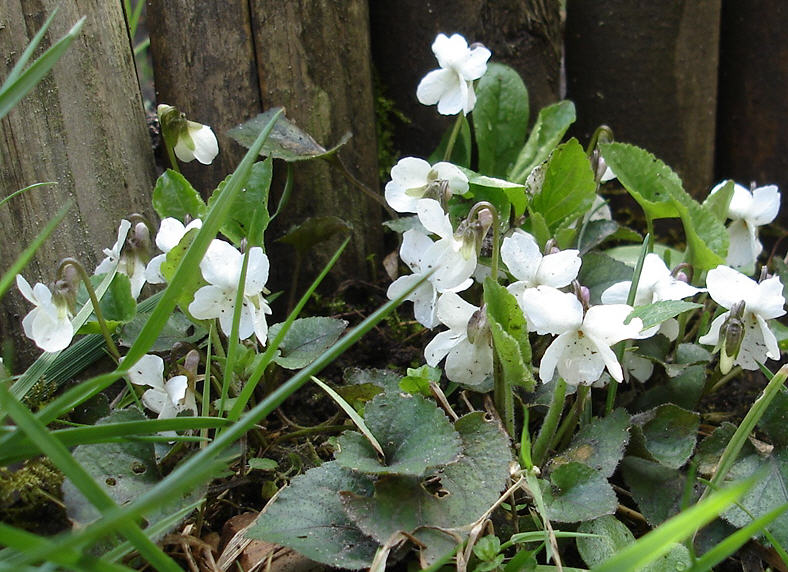

Scientific classification
- Kingdom: Plantae
- Clade: Tracheophytes
- Clade: Angiosperms
- Clade: Eudicots
- Clade: Rosids
- Order: Malpighiales
- Family: Violaceae
- Genus: Viola
- Species: V. alba

Binomial name
- Viola alba Besser

= Viola alba =

Species of flowering plant

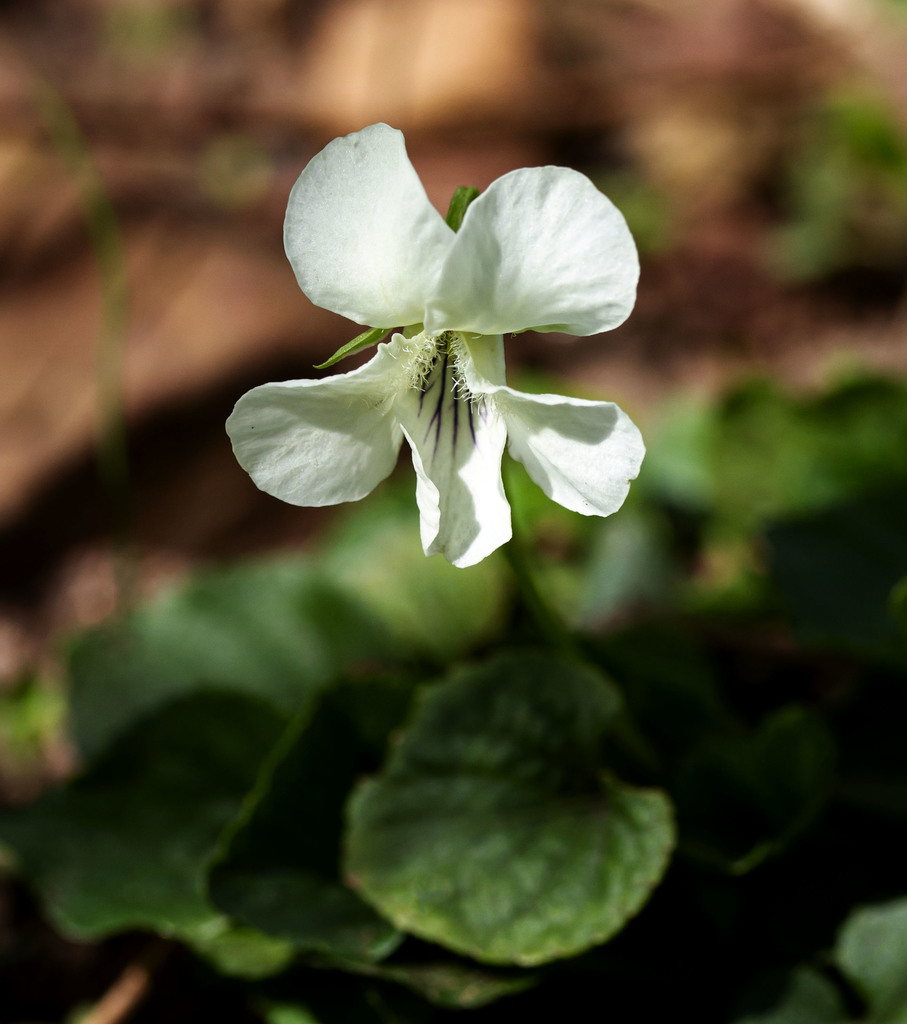
White Violet (Viola alba) in Pennsylvania

Viola alba, commonly known as white violet, is a species of violet in the family Violaceae.

== Subspecies ==
- Viola alba subsp. alba

The native range of this subspecies is S. France to S. Poland and NW. Türkiye, W. Syria, however a there is a new record in Kashmir, India.

- Viola alba subsp. thessala
- Viola alba subsp. alba scotophylla
- Viola alba subsp. dehnhardtii
