= Sourness =

One of the five basic tastes

Sourness
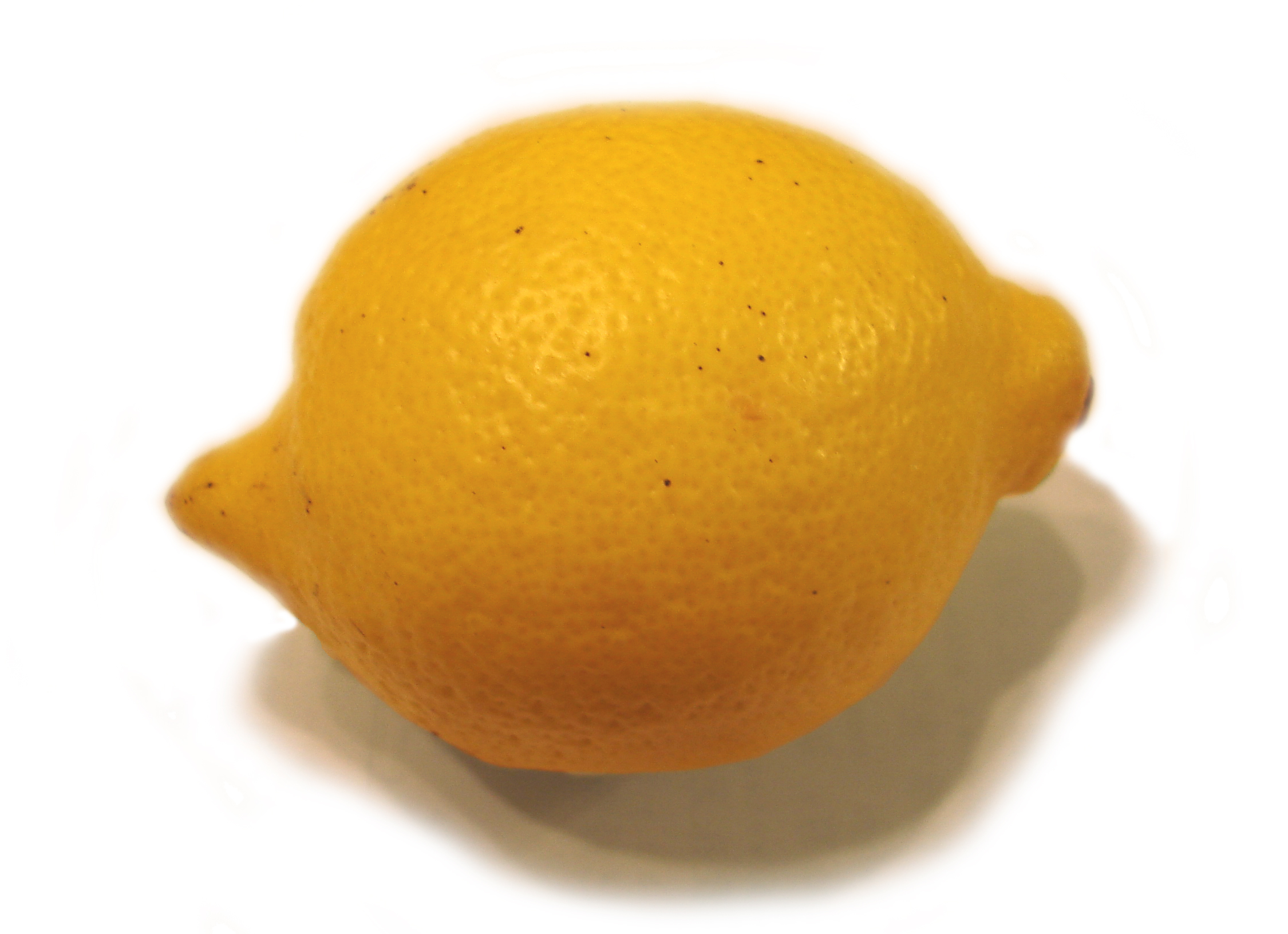
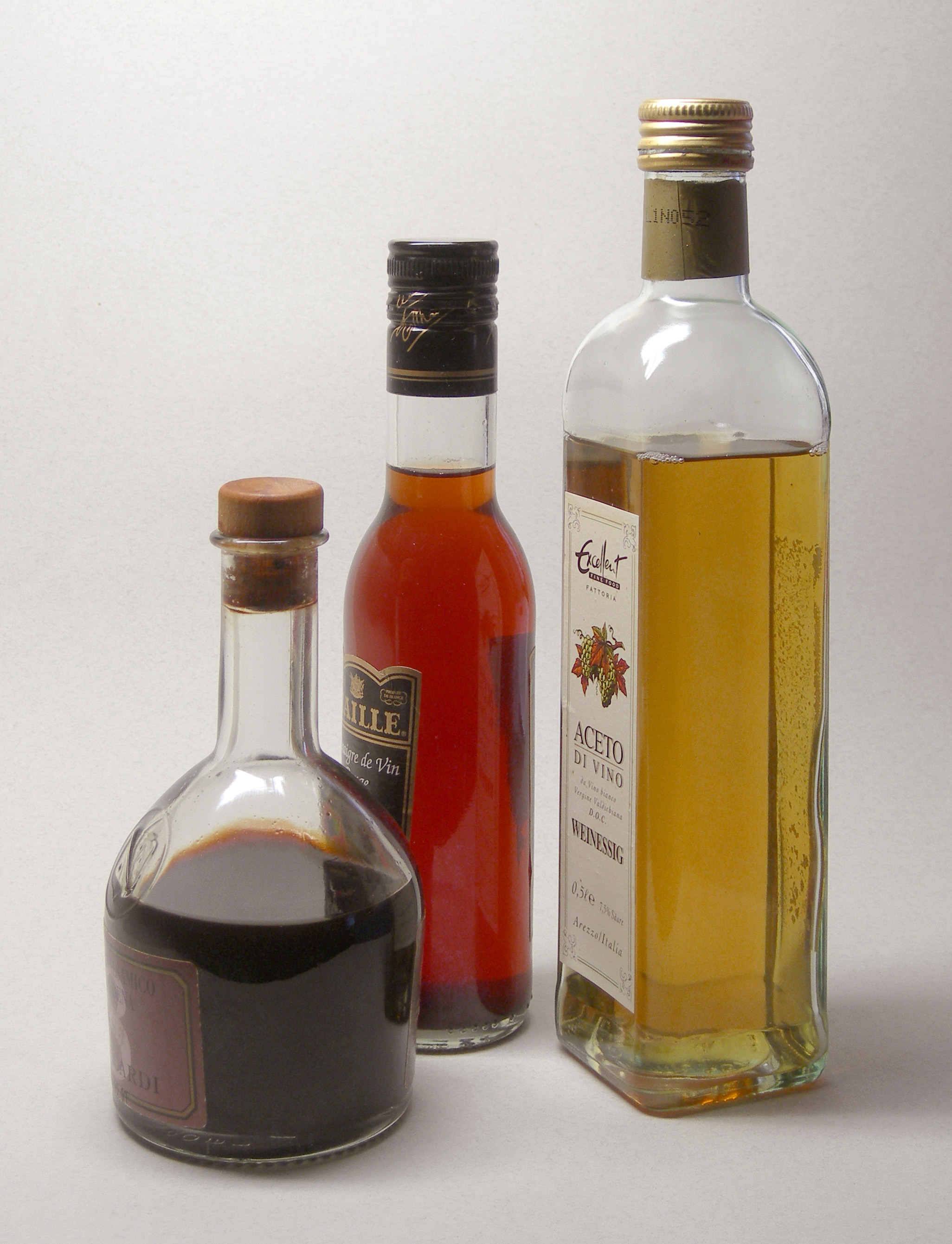
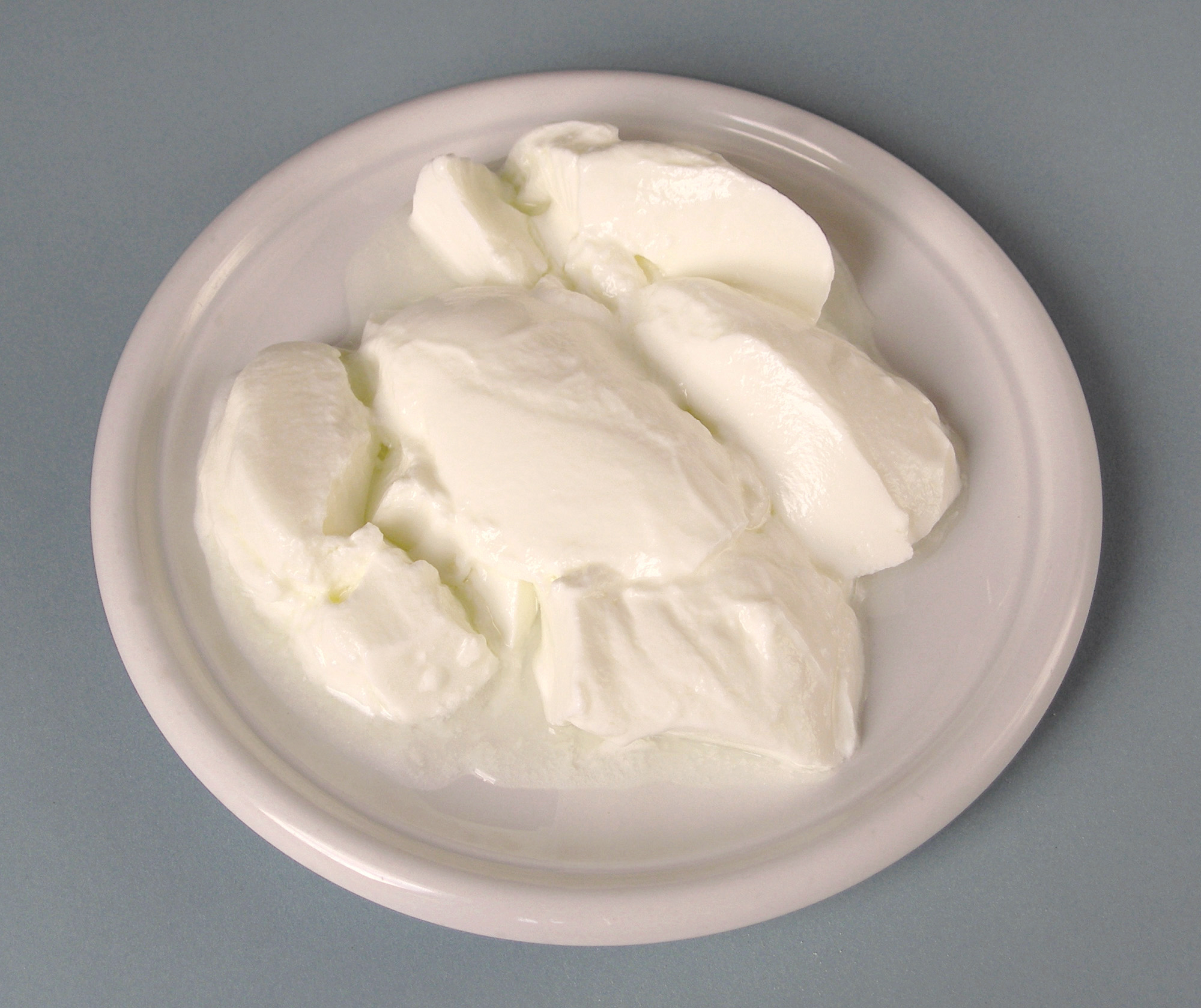
Lemon, vinegar and yoghurt are examples of sour foods.

Sourness, also known as sour, is a basic taste sensation perceived through hydrogen ions from acidic compounds interacting with taste bud receptors, and it can also refer to an unpleasant or acidic quality in taste, disposition, or tone. It is a warning sign for potentially spoiled food, though it is balanced in some food products by sweetness, and it is associated with a low pH.

The most common foods with natural sourness are fruits, such as lemon, lime, grape, orange, tamarind, and bitter melon. Fermented foods, such as wine, sour cream, vinegar or yogurt, may have sour taste. Children show a greater enjoyment of sour flavors than adults, and sour candy containing citric acid or malic acid is common.

== See also ==
- Acidulant
- Sour_sanding
