= Swizzels =

English confectionery manufacturer

Swizzels Matlow Limited
- Logo of Swizzels Matlow

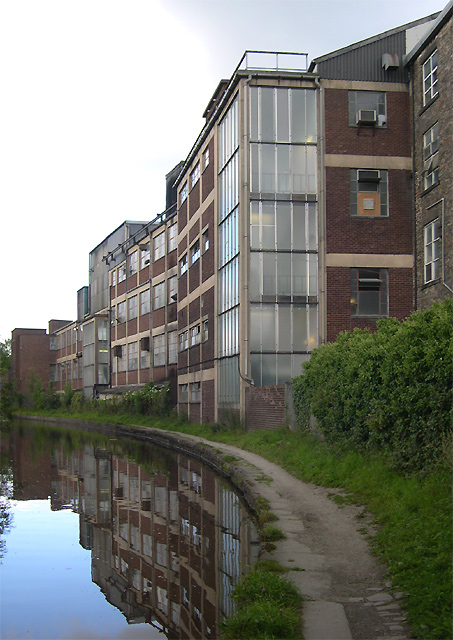
- The Swizzels Matlow factory in New Mills, England
- Type: Private limited company
- Industry: Confectionery
- Founded: 1928; 98 years ago in London, England
- Founders: Maurice and Alfred Matlow
- Products: Love Hearts, Parma Violets, Rainbow Drops, Double Dip
- Revenue: ▲£78,611,000 (2019)
- Net income: ▼£10,088,000 (2019)
- Total assets: ▲£59,170,000 (2019)
- Number of employees: ▲654 (2019)
- Website: swizzels.com

Swizzels Matlow Limited, branded as Swizzels, is a confectionery manufacturer based in New Mills, Derbyshire.

Their highest selling brands are Love Hearts, Parma Violets and Drumstick lollies.

== History ==
Operations began in the early 1920s at a market stall in Hackney, London, with Maurice and Alfred Matlow selling jellied sweets. They built a small factory in east London in 1928 and became known as Matlow Brothers, producing jellies and chews. In 1933 the firm merged with a rival factory owner, David Dee, who specialised in fizzy compressed tablet sweets. The company officially became Swizzels Matlow Ltd in 1975.

In 1940 the Blitz forced their business to relocate northwards to a disused wick factory in New Mills, Derbyshire, where it remains. Parma Violets were introduced in 1946. Love Hearts were introduced in 1954. Drumsticks were introduced in 1957.

Hydrogenated fats were phased out in 2004. Artificial flavourings were discontinued in 2009.

The company had revenues of £47 million in 2010/11 and employs around 600 people. Swizzels Matlow exports 20 per cent of its production, to more than 20 countries, mostly in Europe. Its biggest sales period is Halloween.

== Products ==
=== Refreshers ===
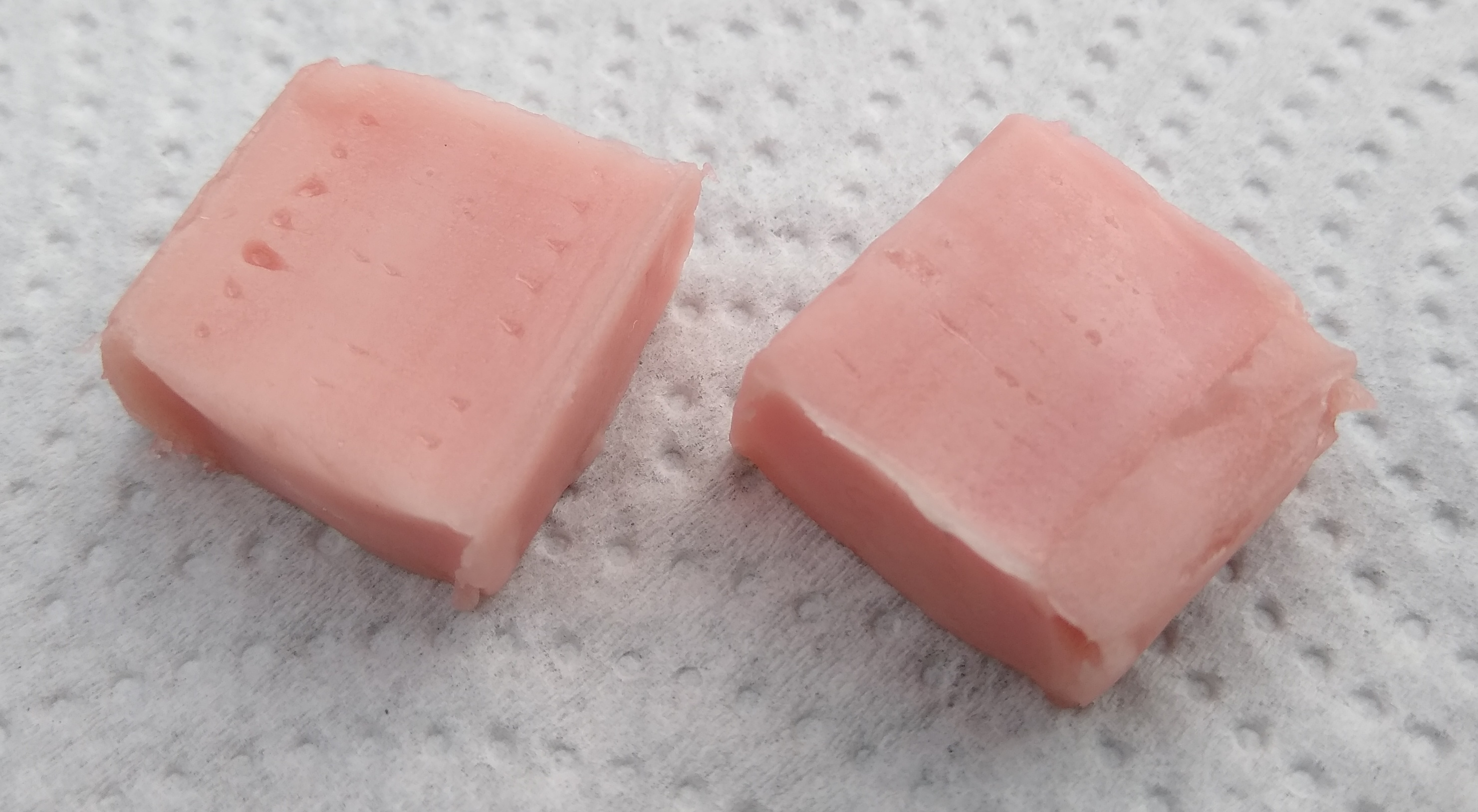
Refreshers

Refreshers are one of Swizzels' most popular products. These are flat chewy sweets with sherbet in the middle, available in lemon and strawberry flavours. They are officially named New Refreshers, to avoid trademark confusion with Barratt's compressed tablet Refreshers sweet.

=== Fizzers ===
Fizzers are rolled-up tablet candies that fizz and dissolve when put into soda. They are similar to the American candy Smarties (called Rockets in Canada). Swizzels Matlow has also released a line of Giant Fizzers.

=== Parma Violets ===
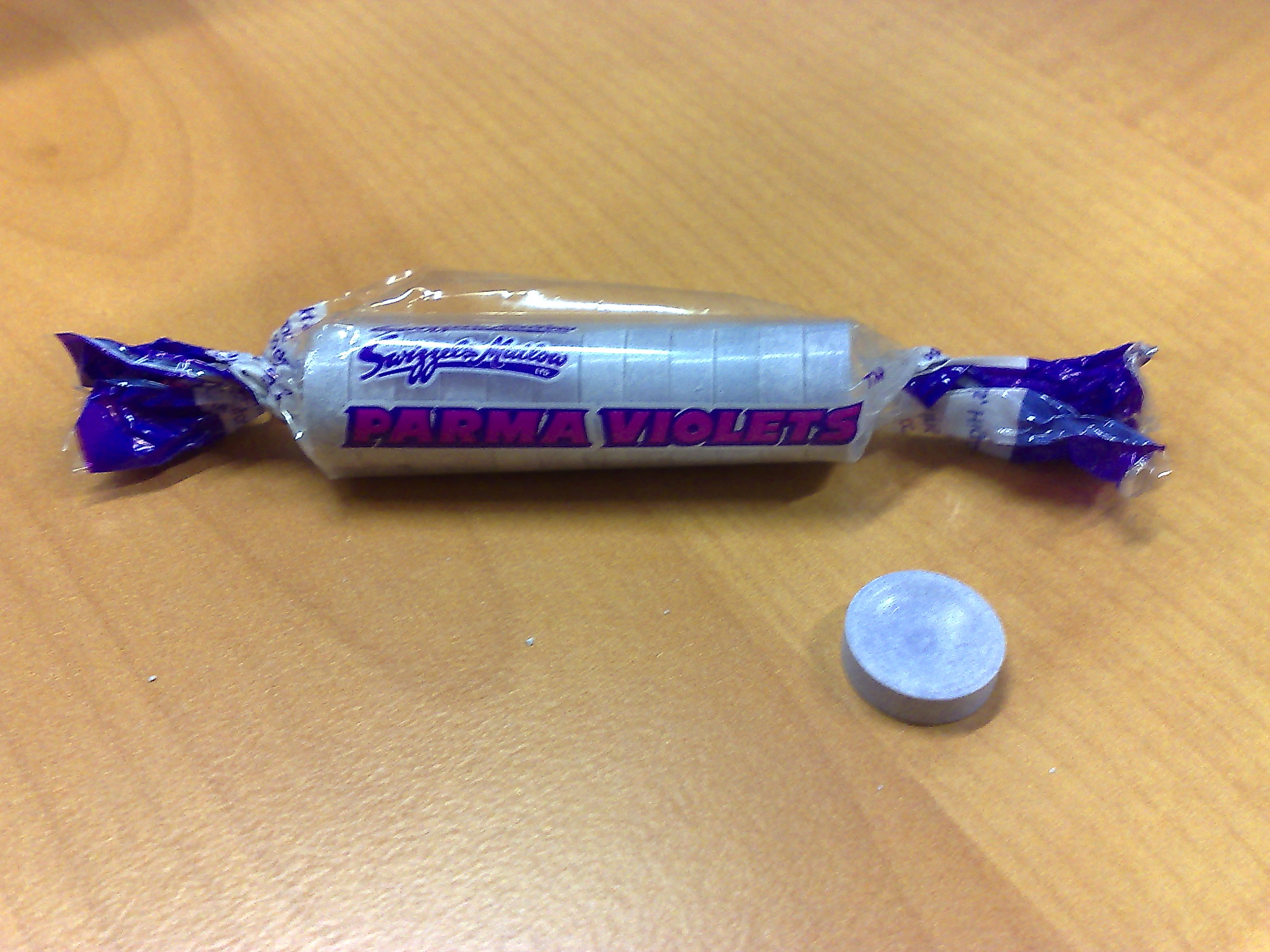
Parma Violets

Parma Violets are disc-shaped sweets similar to Fizzers but all lilac coloured with an almost 'scenty' taste and no fizziness. Swizzels Matlow has also released a line of Giant Parma Violets.

=== Drumstick products ===
The Drumstick sweet is a chewy lolly about 5 cm (2 inches) in length. It features two flavours, milk and raspberry. It has had many special editions, such as the still produced lime and orange flavour. Drumsticks are now vegan.

Drumstick Chew Bars is a chewy bar format of the Drumstick lolly.

In 2012, Swizzels Matlow launched "Drumstick Squashies", foam-like chewy sweets with the same flavour as the Drumstick lolly. The following flavour variations have been released:

- Squashies Drumstick Original (Raspberry and Milk flavour)
- Squashies Drumstick Sour Cherry and Apple
- Squashies Drumstick Strawberry and lCream
- Squashies Drumstick Rhubarb and Custard
- Squashies Drumstick Cherry Cola
- Squashies Drumstick Bubblegum
- Squashies Drumstick Banana and Blueberry (Minions Themed)
- Squashies Drumchick (Orange & Pineapple flavour)
- Squashies Sour Shooting Stars (Sour Fruit flavour)
- Squashies Tropical (Tropical Fruit flavour)
- Squashies Love Hearts
- Squashies Double Dip (Orange and Cherry Flavour)
- Squashies Fizzlers (Fruit Flavour)
- Squashies Squeletons (Sour Apple, Strawberry and Orange flavour)
- Squashies Sour Apple Grinch
- Squashies Naughty & Nice (Strawberry Ice Cream and Apple Pie flavour)

In 2020, Swizzels released a Drumstick Chocolate Bar. It consists of milk chocolate with a raspberry and milk flavour filling with freeze-dried raspberry pieces. Unlike the Drumstick Squashies, the chocolate bar is suitable for vegetarians.

=== Others ===
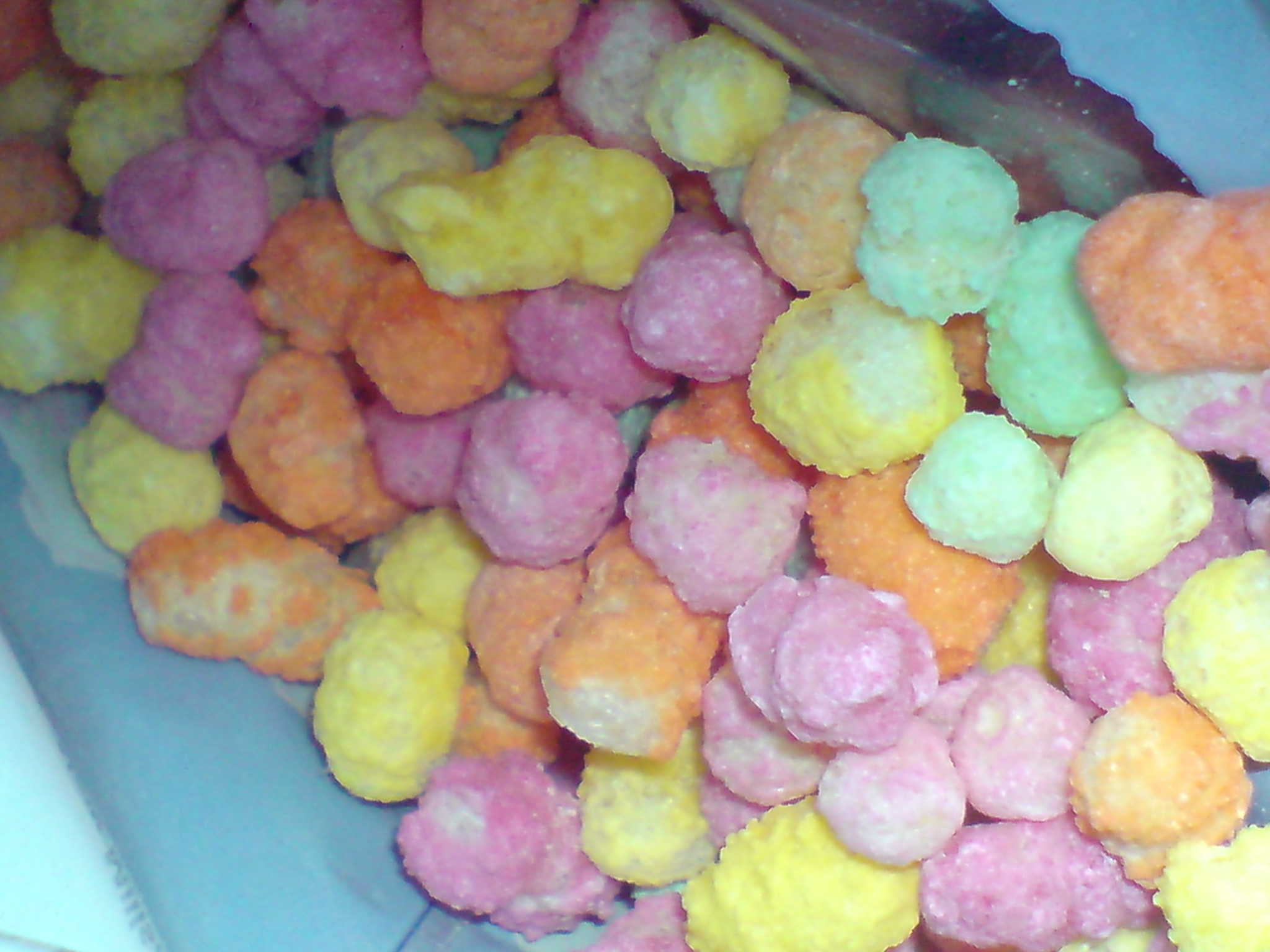
Rainbow Drops

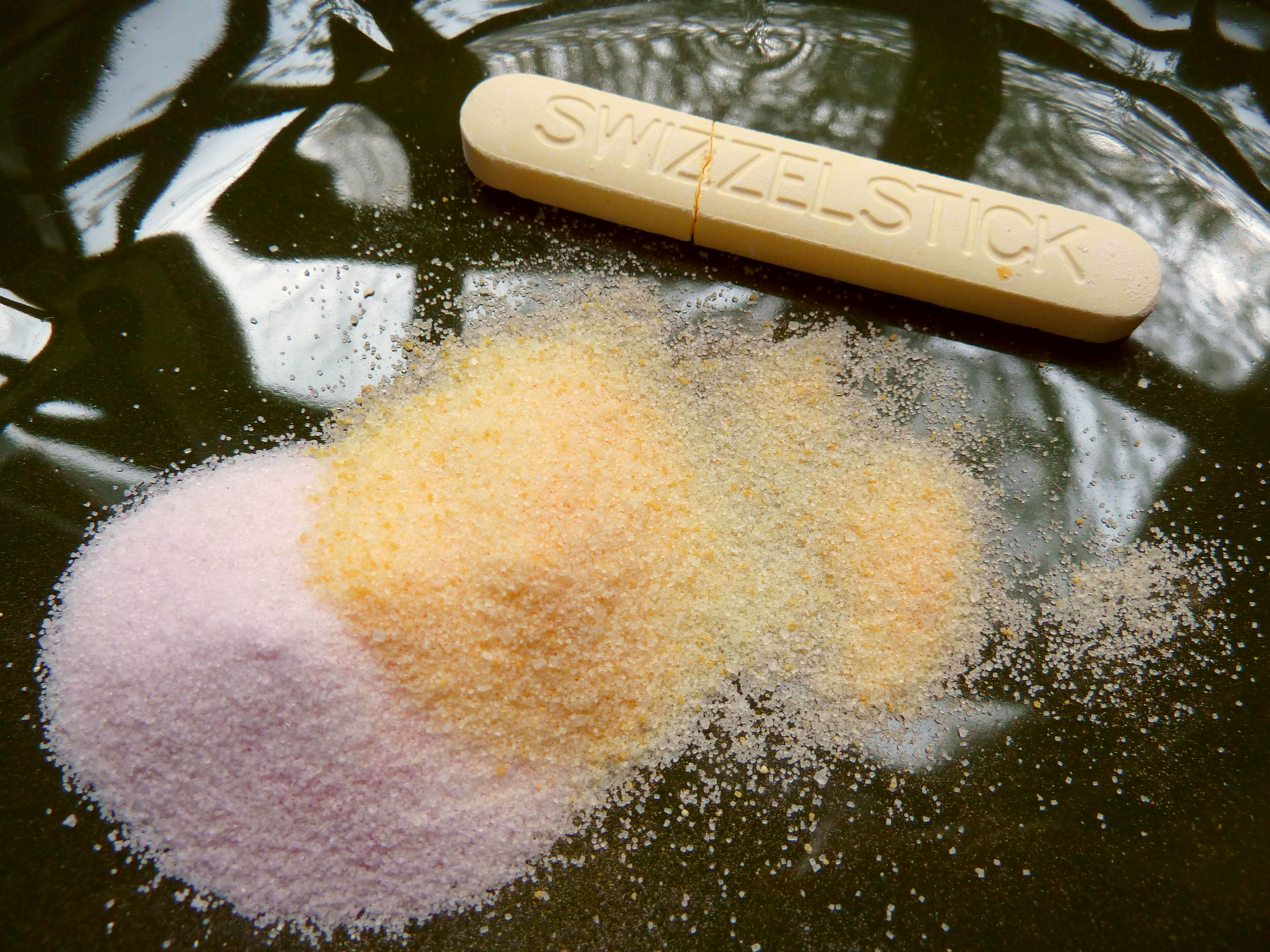
Double Dip

Products include:

- Banana Skids
- Climpies
- Double Lollies
- Fruity Pops
- Fun Gums
- Snap & Crackle
- Mr Chews
- Rainbow Dust
- Rainbow Drops
- Love Hearts
- Double Dip
- Tango Orange Flavour Chew Bar
- Stinger Tutti-Fruiti Flavour Chew Bar
- Crystal Fruits
