= Smart =

Smart may refer to a high level of intelligence or "street smarts".

"Smart" or SMART may also refer to the following.

== Arts and entertainment ==
- Smart (Hey! Say! JUMP album), 2014
- Smart (Hotels.com), former mascot of Hotels.com
- Smart (Sleeper album), 1995 debut album by Sleeper
- SMart, a children's television series about art on CBBC
- "Smart" (song), by Le Sserafim
- Smart Museum of Art, a museum in Chicago, Illinois, US
- Studies in Medieval and Renaissance Teaching, or SMART, a peer-reviewed journal

== Businesses and brands ==
- S-Mart, a Mexican grocery store chain
- Smart (advertising agency), an Australian company
- SmartCell, a network operator in Nepal
- Smart Communications, a cellular service provider in the Philippines
- Smart Technologies, a company providing group collaboration tools
- Smart Telecom, a network operator in the Republic of Ireland
- Smart Telecom (Uganda), a network operator in Uganda
- Smart (cigarette), an Austrian brand
- Smart (drink), a brand of fruit-flavored soda produced by The Coca-Cola Company for Mainland China
- Smart Axiata, a network operator in Cambodia

== Other organizations ==
- Smart Museum of Art, a museum in Chicago, Illinois, US
- SMART (Malaysia), a disaster relief and rescue task force
- International Association of Sheet Metal, Air, Rail and Transportation Workers (SMART), a North American labor union
- Sikh Mediawatch and Resource Task Force, the former name of the Sikh American Legal Defense and Education Fund
- Start Making A Reader Today, an Oregon-based volunteer literacy program for at-risk PreK-3 readers

== Grants ==
- Small firms' Merit Award for Research and Technology, run by the UK Department of Trade and Industry in the 1980s and 1990s
- Smart Scotland, innovation grant scheme for small and medium-sized firms
- National Science & Mathematics Access to Retain Talent Grant, a former US federal grant
- SMART Defense Scholarship Program, a US Department of Defense workforce development program

== People ==
- Smart (surname), (including a list of people with the name)

== Science and technology ==
=== Aviation ===
- Strategic Management of Airspace, Routes and Trajectories (SMART), a predictive AI air traffic tool deployed in the US in 2026

=== Computing ===
- Smart device, an electronic device connected to other devices or networks wirelessly
- Self-Monitoring, Analysis, and Reporting Technology (S.M.A.R.T.), a standard used in computer storage devices
- SMART Information Retrieval System, an information retrieval system developed at Cornell University in the 1960s
- Smart Package Manager, a planned successor to the APT-RPM package management utility

=== Military ===
- SMART (missile) or Supersonic Missile Assisted Release of Torpedo, an anti-submarine missile developed for the Indian Navy
- SMArt 155, a German artillery shell that uses anti-armour submunitions

=== Space ===
- Small Missions for Advanced Research in Technology, a European Space Agency programme
- SMART-1 (Small Missions for Advanced Research in Technology #1), a European Space Agency mission to the Moon

=== Other uses in science and technology ===
- Scandinavian Multi Access Reservations for Travel Agents, a computerized system for ticket reservation
- Simple Modular Architecture Research Tool, a biological database used in the identification and analysis of protein domains within protein sequences
- SMART-R, the Shared Mobile Atmospheric Research and Teaching Radar

== Transport ==
=== United States ===
- Sonoma–Marin Area Rail Transit, in the northern San Francisco Bay Area, California
- South Metro Area Regional Transit in Wilsonville, Oregon
- Southern Minnesota Area Rural Transit, in Albert Lea, Austin, Owatonna, and Waseca, Minnesota
- Starkville MSU Area Rapid Transit, a public transportation system in Starkville, Mississippi, and Mississippi State University
- Suburban Mobility Authority for Regional Transportation, the transit authority for suburban Detroit, Michigan

=== Automotive ===
- Smart (marque), a car manufacturer co-owned by Mercedes-Benz and Geely
- Smart #1, an electric crossover SUV
- Smart #3, an electric crossover SUV
- Smart #5, an electric crossover SUV

=== Other uses in transport ===
- SMART Tunnel, the Stormwater Management and Road Tunnel in Kuala Lumpur, Malaysia
- Scandinavian Multi Access Reservations for Travel Agents, a computerized system for ticket reservation

== Other uses ==
- Studies in Medieval and Renaissance Teaching, or SMART, a peer-reviewed journal
- SMART criteria (specific, measurable, assignable, realistic, time-related), a mnemonic used to set goals or objectives and evaluate performance
- SMART Recovery (Self Management and Recovery Training), addiction recovery based on REBT principles

== See also ==
- Smarts (disambiguation)
- Smartt (disambiguation)
- Smarty (disambiguation)
- Snart (disambiguation)
