= Bottle Caps (candy) =

Sweet tablet candies made to look like metal soda bottle caps

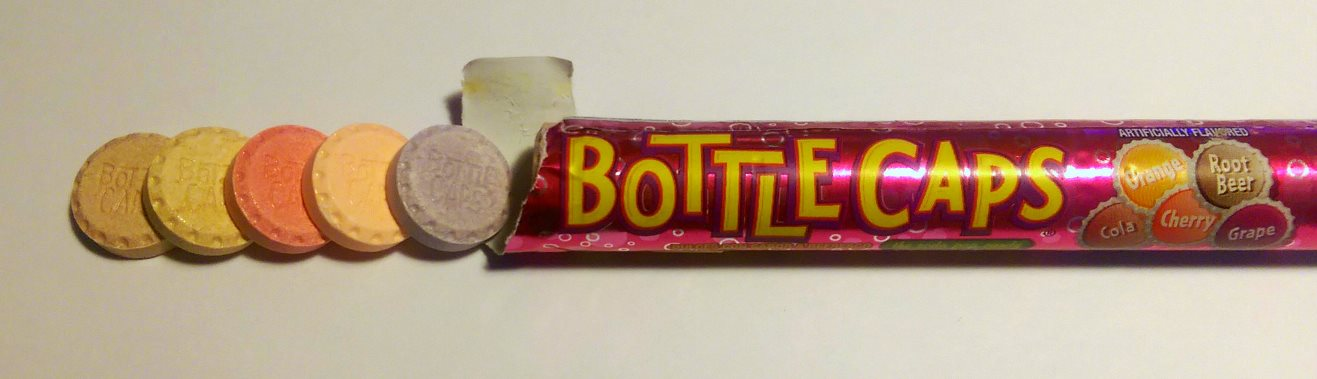
Roll of Bottle Caps: Cola, Root Beer, Cherry, Orange, and Grape

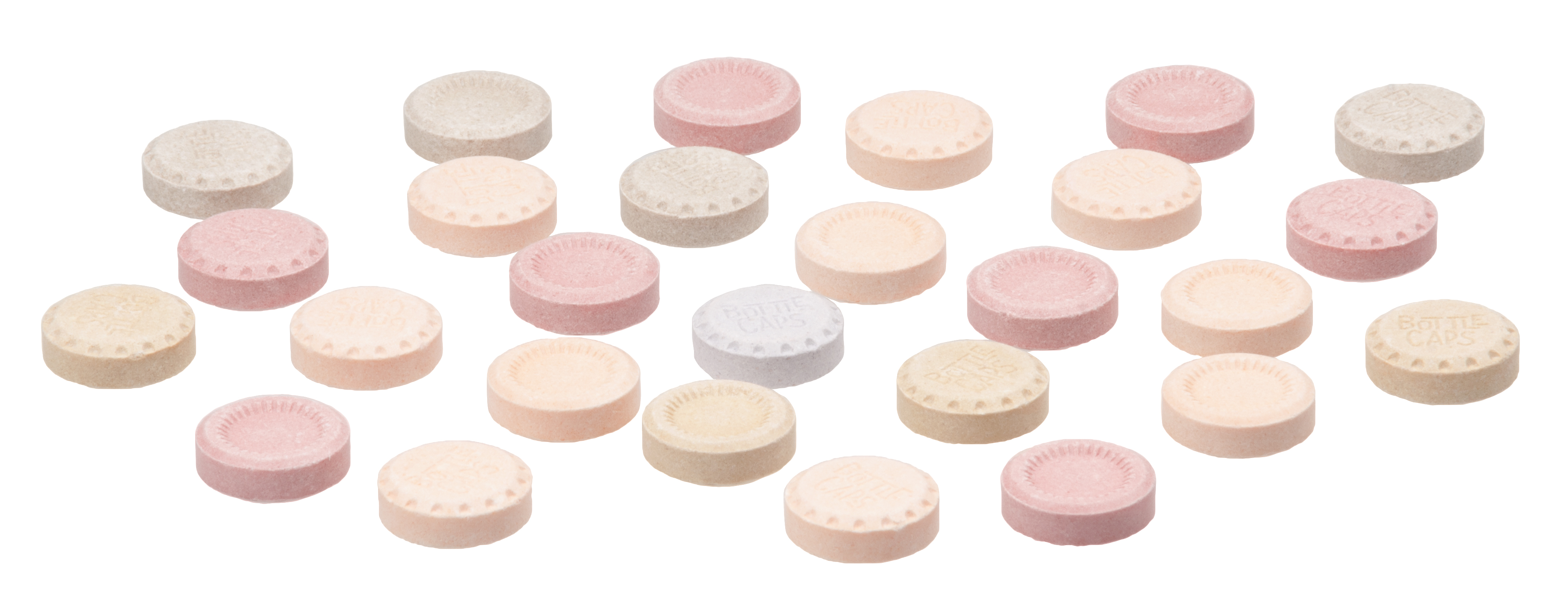
Bottle Cap candies

Bottle Caps are sweet tablet candies made to look like metal soda bottle caps in grape, cola, orange, root beer, and cherry flavors. Bottle Caps candy was originally introduced by Breaker Confections in 1972, and were later manufactured by Sunmark Corporation a subsidiary of Rowntree's, that Nestlé acquired after purchasing the parent company in 1988. Together with several of the candies they now owned, Nestlé began selling Bottle Caps under the "Wonka" brand. They are currently sold by the Ferrara Candy Company.

Bottle Caps have a tart but slightly sweet taste to them, not wholly dissimilar to Smarties Candy Company's Smarties (Rockets outside the U.S.), SweeTarts or Runts, but with soda flavors and altered shapes. Bottle Caps were originally sold in green pouches. They currently are available in purple packages weighing 0.73 oz (21 g) and containing approximately 24 pieces. They also can be purchased in a box containing 48 packages, or in small individually wrapped pouches of three candies, meant to be given out as Halloween treats in the United States. They may also come in a box with 5 oz (140 g) of the candies.

Early bottle caps included an ingredient to produce a fizzing sensation in the mouth, though this was later removed. They candy has a reputation as nostalgic.

In the past, Bottle Caps contained a lemon-lime flavor instead of the current cherry flavor. There was also a time when Willy Wonka Co. made Fizzy Bottle Caps. These were similar to the original but contained ingredients to make them fizz when eaten, making them a bit more flavorful.

In early 2009, individual Bottle Caps candy was made much smaller. The underside was flattened, and no longer resembles the underside of a bottle cap.

== See also ==
- List of confectionery brands
