= Ice Queen (restaurant) =

Paleteria and dessert shop in Portland, Oregon, U.S.

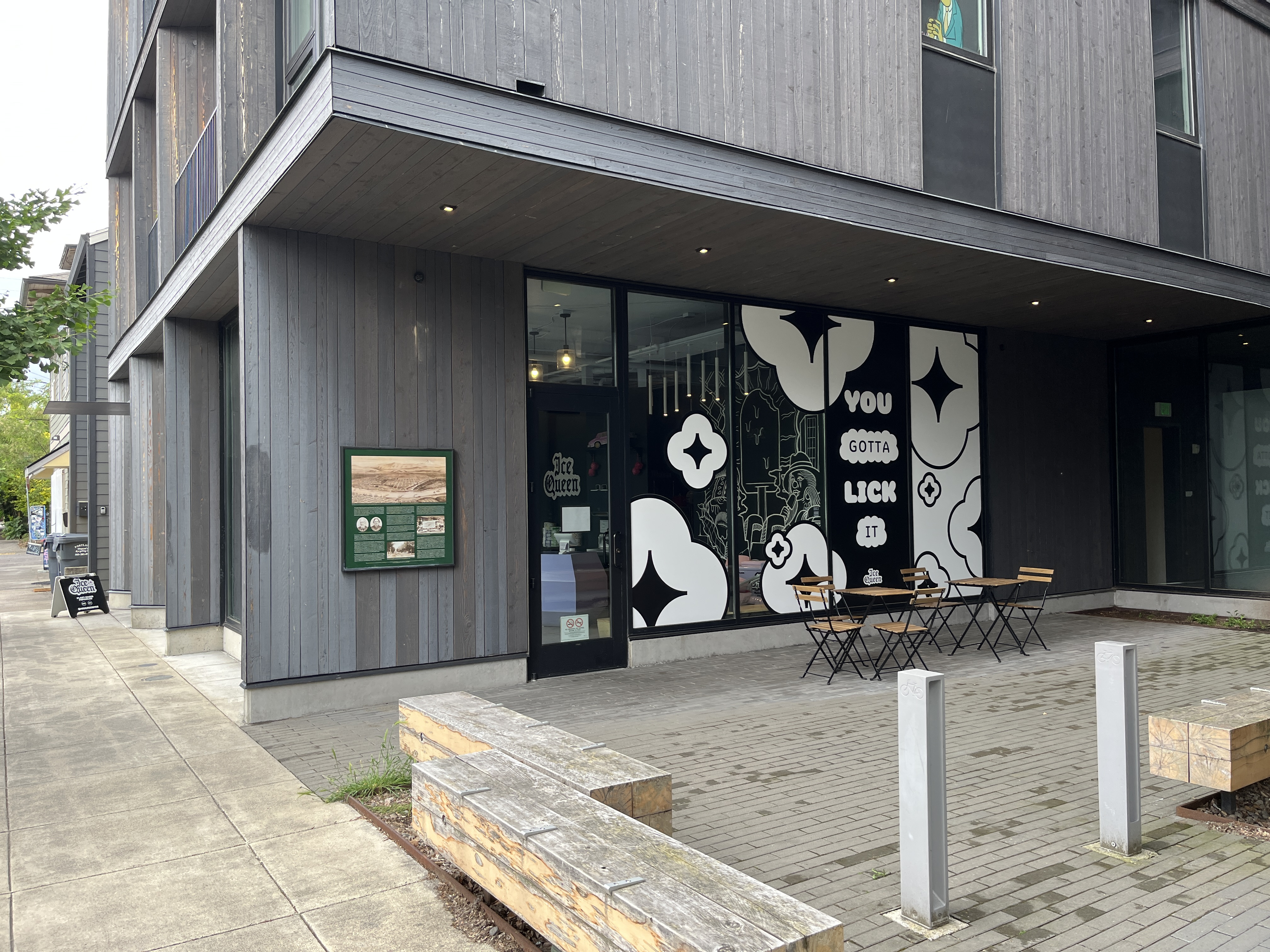
- The shop's exterior in 2025
- Interactive map of Ice Queen

Restaurant information
- Established: 2018
- Owner: Rebecca Smith
- Location: 2012 Southeast 11th Avenue, Portland, Multnomah, Oregon, 97214, United States
- Coordinates: 45.5084°N 122.6545°W
- Website: icequeenyouscream.com

Ice Queen (sometimes Ice Queen PDX) is a vegan ice cream and dessert shop in Portland, Oregon, United States. It serves Mexican-style ice pops (paletas) and calls itself a paleteria.

== Description ==
Ice Queen is a Chicana- and Indigenous-owned vegan paleteria and dessert shop at 11th and Harrison Street in southeast Portland's Hosford-Abernethy neighborhood, near Ladd's Addition. The shop's logo was designed by Tyler Alexander of the local advertising agency Kamp Grizzly.

=== Menu ===
In addition to vegan paletas, Ice Queen offers vegan soft serve, chocolate-covered bananas, and cotton candy. Among paleta varieties are "oatchata" (horchata with oat milk base) and watermelon Tajín seasoning. Other paleta bases include avocado, coconut, and juice. The Lime All Yours comes with a small bottle of Tajin chile flakes, the Partners N' Cream has a soy milk base and cookies, and the She's in Parties has birthday cake and sprinkles. Other paleta varieties have included "fresa" (with Oregon strawberry), fudge, toasted coconut, and Tamal de Chocolate (masa ice cream with a Mexican chocolate filling). There have also been seasonal and holiday specials, such as the Halloween-themed varieties for October such as the pumpkin pie-flavored Shut Your Pie Hole and float made with chamoy.

Ice Queen's soft serve Thiccflurries (variants of the McFlurry by McDonald's) have an oat and soy milk base and are available in chocolate, vanilla, or swirl. Toppings such as cookie, marshmallow, sprinkles, and strawberry sauce are also vegan. Among predetermined Thiccflurries are cookies and cream and the Fruity Flurry, which has strawberry sauce, smarties dust, watermelon-flavored Sour Patch Kids, and a cherry. The Secret Admirer has a cherry chocolate base with cherries and chocolate chips, and the S'mores has a chocolate shell, graham crackers, and marshmallows.

As a pop-up, Ice Queen offered ice cream floats with Jarritos, creamsicles with Cheetos dust, and ice cream bars like the Apple Bottom, which has caramel and peanut butter, and the Mangonada with chamoy and mango.

== History ==
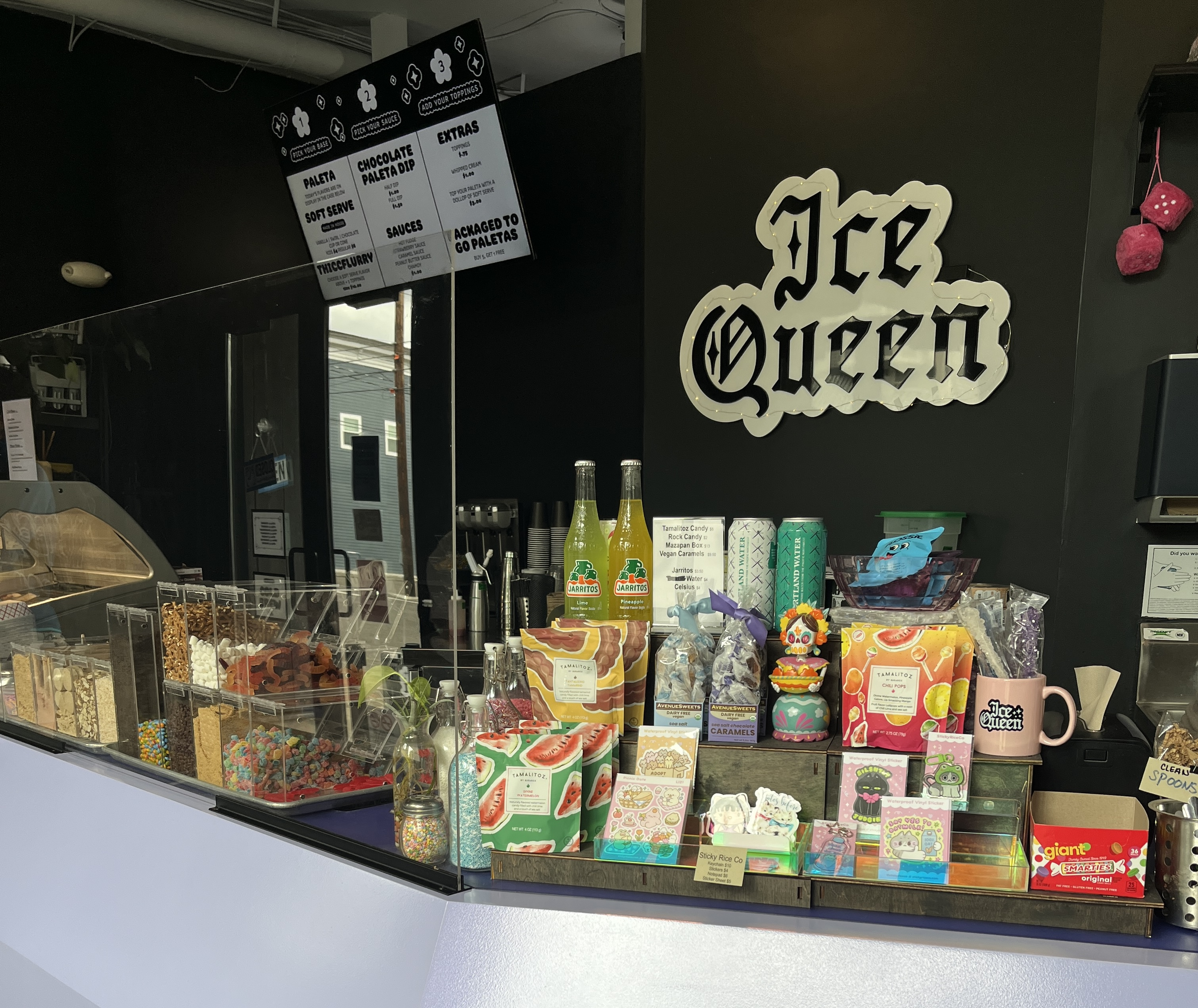
Interior, 2025

Owner Rebecca Smith began making paletas and launched Ice Queen in 2018. In July 2020, following a series of pop-ups, Smith moved to a storefront with a walk-up window on Stark Street in southeast Portland, in a space that previously housed the tattoo shop Scapegoat. Smith moved to a brick and mortar shop on October 14, 2022. Ice Queen's products were also available at 45 local grocery store and markets at the time.

In 2026, Ice Queen released themed products monthly. Themes included Heated Rivalry, Rugrats, and SpongeBob SquarePants.

== Reception ==
Meira Gebel and Emily Harris included the business in Axios Portland's 2023 overview of the city's best popsicles. Ice Queen was included in Portland Monthly's 2024 overview of the city's best ice cream. The business won in the Best Vegan Ice Cream Shop category of VegNews's 2023 overview of the nation's 28 best vegan restaurants. Ice Queen also ranked second in the Best Vegan Ice Cream Spot category of the magazine's 2024 restaurant awards. Anastasia Sloan included the business in Eater Portland's 2025 overview of the city's best dairy-free frozen desserts.

== See also ==
- List of vegetarian and vegan restaurants
