= Smarty =

Smarty may refer to:

- Smarty (template engine), web template system
- Smarty (wireless carrier), UK virtual mobile phone operator
- Smarty (film), a 1934 comedy film, known as Hit Me Again in the UK
- Funny Face (musical), a 1927 Broadway musical originally called Smarty

== See also ==
- Smart (disambiguation)
- Smarties (disambiguation)
