= Smart (surname) =

Smart is a surname.

== People ==
- Allan Smart (born 1974), Scottish former footballer
- Amelia Smart (born 1998), Canadian alpine ski racer
- Amy Smart (born 1976), American actress and former fashion model
- Andrew Smart (born 1986), English footballer
- Ben Smart (disappeared 1998), victim of a double murder in New Zealand
- Christopher Smart (1722–1771), English poet
- Colin Smart (born 1950), English rugby union international
- Craig Smart (singer), Canadian singer songwriter
- Eleanor Smart (born 1995), American high diver
- Eliza Brown Newton Smart (1844-1930), Portugal-born British missionary and temperance worker
- Elizabeth Smart (disambiguation), multiple people
  - Elizabeth Smart (born 1987), American political activist and child kidnapping victim
  - Elizabeth Smart (Canadian author) (1913–1986), Canadian poet and novelist
- Erinn Smart (born 1980), American fencer, sister of Keeth Smart
- Floyd Smart (1894–1955), American athlete
- Sir George Thomas Smart (1776–1867), English musician
- H. C. Smart (1878–1951), Australian publicist in London
- Irene Smart (1921–2017), American judge and politician
- J. J. C. Smart (1920–2012), Scottish professor of philosophy
- J. Scott Smart (1902–1960), American actor
- Jack Smart (footballer), English footballer in the early part of the 20th century
- James H. Smart (1841–1900), American educator and administrator
- Jean Smart (born 1950), American actress in the TV show Designing Women
- Jeffrey Smart, (1921–2013) Australian painter
- John Smart (1741–1811), English painter of portrait miniatures
- John Elliott Smart (1916–2008), Royal Navy officer in the Second World War
- Joseph F. Smart (1870–1938), American politician
- Keeth Smart (born 1978), American Olympic sabre fencer
- Keith Smart (born 1964), American basketball player and coach
- Kelvin Smart (born 1960), Welsh boxer
- Kevin Smart (born 1958), English retired footballer
- Kirby Smart (born 1975), American football coach
- Leta Myers Smart (1894–1981), American writer and activist
- Lisa Smart (disambiguation), multiple people
  - Lisa Smart, American politician
  - Lisa Smart (British politician), British Member of Parliament
- Marcus Smart (born 1994), American basketball player
- Marjorie Gordon Smart (1911–1982) British, Canadian and Australian diplomat and a founding college principal in Australia.
- Nigel Smart (born 1969), former Australian rules footballer
- Nigel Smart (cryptographer) (born 1967), professor of computer science
- Pr. Ninian Smart (1927–2001), Scottish Religious Studies academic
- Pamela Smart (born 1967), American accomplice to murder of her husband
- Paul Smart (motorcyclist) (1943–2021), English short circuit motorcycle road racer
- Paul Smart (sailor) (1892–1979), American sailor and Olympic champion
- Reuben D. Smart (1832–1890), American politician
- Richard Smart (actor) (1913–1992), Broadway actor and rancher
- Richard Smart (MP) (died 1560), English politician and Member of Parliament
- Dr. Richard Smart (viticulturalist) (born 1945), Australian viticulturalist
- Roger Smart (born 1943), retired footballer
- Sally Smart (born 1960), Australian artist
- Sarah Smart (born 1977), English Actress
- Shaka Smart (born 1977), American college basketball coach
- Tamara Smart (born 2005), English actress
- Tanzel Smart (born 1994), American football player
- Tim Smart (businessman), British businessman
- Wallace Alexander Smart (1898–1943) Scottish and British Royal Air Force flying ace

== Fictional characters ==
- Colleen Smart, on the Australian soap opera Home and Away
- Liz Smart (disambiguation), multiple characters
- Maxwell Smart, the protagonist of the American TV series Get Smart

== See also ==
- Smart (disambiguation)
- Rosny Smarth
