= Elizabeth Smart (disambiguation) =

Elizabeth Smart (born 1987) is an American activist and former kidnapping victim.

Elizabeth Smart may also refer to:

== People ==
- Elizabeth Smart (Canadian author) (1913–1986), Canadian poet and writer
- Elizabeth Smart (fl. 21st century), Scottish educator, rector of Bell Baxter High School, Cupar, Fife, Scotland, UK
- Elizabeth Smart (fl. 21st century), a Coalition Avenir Québec candidate in the 2014 Quebec provincial election
- Elizabeth Smart (16th century), mother of Irish judge John Elliott (1546–1617)
- Elizabeth Smart (died 1635), wife of English actor Henry Condell (1576–1627)
- Elizabeth Smart (18th century), mother of Smart Lethieullier (1701–1760), British antiquarian
- Elizabeth Smart, subject of a 22 May 1775 Act of the Parliament of Great Britain [15 Geo. 3. c. 54]
- Elizabeth Smart, subject of a 3 July 1835 Act of the Parliament of the United Kingdom [5 & 6 Will. 4. c. 6]

== Arts, entertainment and media ==
- Elizabeth Smart: Autobiography, a 2017 documentary TV series about the kidnap victim and her family
- Elizabeth Smart: On the Side of the Angels, a 1991 documentary film by Red Queen Productions about the Canadian poet
- Elizabeth Smart: The Collected Poems, an anthology by the Canadian poet, whose French-language translation edition won a 2021 Governor General's Awards
- Elizabeth Smart: A Fugue Essay on Women and Creativity, a 2004 book by Kim Echlin

== See also ==
- Lisa Smart (disambiguation)
- Liz Smart (disambiguation)
- The Elizabeth Smart Story, a 2003 U.S. crime drama telefilm about the kidnap victim
- I Am Elizabeth Smart, a 2017 U.S. crime drama telefilm about the kidnap victim
- By Heart: Elizabeth Smart, a Life, a 1991 biography of the Canadian poet by Rosemary Sullivan
- Elizabeth (given name)
- Smart (surname)
