= Smarties (disambiguation) =

Smarties is a chocolate confectionery made by Nestlé.

Smartie or Smarties may also refer to:

- Smarties (tablet candy), a confectionery made by Smarties Candy Company (formerly Ce De Candy)
- Smarties, a variety of Troggles in the Number Munchers computer game
- SMARTIE, a modification of the SMART criteria

== See also ==
- Smarty (disambiguation)
