= Liz Smart =

Liz Smart may refer to:

- Elizabeth Smart (born 1987), American kidnapping victim
- Liz Smart (Japanese: リィズ・スマート, romanized: Ryizu Sumāto), a fictional character from the Japanese light novel series and anime TV show Let This Grieving Soul Retire!
- Liz Smart, a fictional character from the British teledrama Doctors

== See also ==
- Elizabeth Smart (disambiguation)
- Lisa Smart (disambiguation)
- All pages with titles containing "Liz" and "Smart"
- Liz (disambiguation)
- Smart (surname)
