= Smartt =

Smartt may refer to:

- Smartt, Tennessee, an unincorporated community in Warren County, Tennessee
- Joseph Smartt (1931–2013), British geneticist and grain legume expert
- Madison Smartt Bell (born 1957), American novelist
- Mike Smartt (21st century), British journalist
- Oskar Smartt (born 2005), Australian rules footballer
- Stephen Smartt (born 1968), British astrophysicist
- Stone Smartt (born 1998), American football player
- USS Smartt (DE-257), an Evarts class destroyer escort

== See also ==
- Smart (disambiguation)
