= Snart (disambiguation) =

Captain Cold (Leonard Snart) is a DC Comics supervillain.

Snart may also refer to:

- Golden Glider (Lisa Snart), Captain Cold's younger sister
- Lewis Snart, Captain Cold's father in the television series The Flash
- Roy Snart, actor in Bedknobs and Broomsticks

== See also ==
- Smart (disambiguation)
