= Cowan Cocoa and Chocolate =

Cocoa powder and chocolate producer in Toronto, Canada

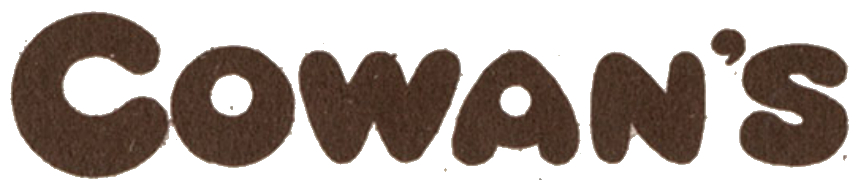
- Industry: Food production
- Founded: 1885
- Founder: John Warren Cowan
- Defunct: 1926
- Headquarters: 72 Sterling Road, Toronto, Ontario, Canada
- Products: cocoa powder, milk chocolate

Cowan Cocoa and Chocolate, commonly known as Cowan's Cocoa was a historic chocolate and cocoa powder manufacturer based in Toronto, Ontario, Canada. It was founded in 1885 to produce cocoa powder for the Canadian market. It diversified into milk chocolate products. It was eventually sold to the British Rowntree's confection makers in 1926, which continued some of the Cowan's product line for some years afterward. Its 1905 Toronto factory still stands today, part of Nestlé's production facilities in Canada.

== History ==
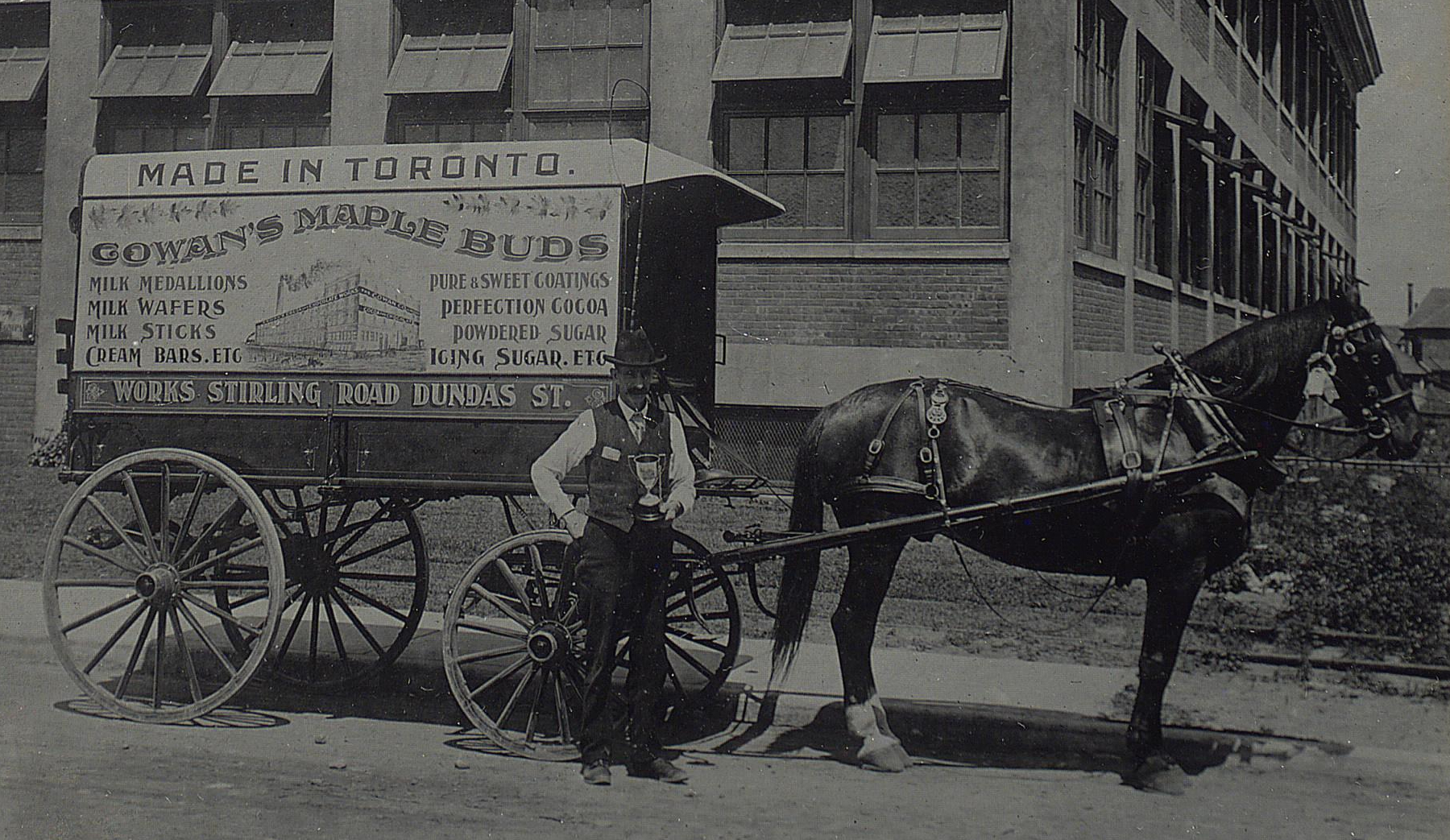
Cart of Cowan's products with man holding trophy won in 1910 by the Cowan factory

The company was founded in 1885 by John Warren Cowan, an Irish immigrant. Cowan was born in Ireland in 1841, moved to Canada with his parents in the 1850s to Princeton, Upper Canada, near Woodstock. He married Isabella Dimmock of Montreal in 1867, while working there in sales for John Duncan and Company tea company. They raised eight children.

Cowan's first company was founded as "John W. Cowan and Company", a travelling coffee and tea sales firm, in 1876. In 1885, Cowan founded Cowan, Musgrave and Company in Toronto for the production of cocoa powder and chocolate, buying the assets of an existing manufacturer that had failed. Using a small grinding mill, Cowan began the production and sale of cocoa powder in 1886.

Cowan had difficulty launching the firm and took on a partner, Guelph businessman John A. Wood, and the two formed the Cowan Cocoa and Chocolate Company of Toronto Limited joint stock company in 1890. They began a period of expansion after lobbying the Canadian federal government for tariff protection. In 1891, the firm promoted its products at the Toronto Industrial Exhibition displaying "Iceland Moss Cocoa", "Queen's Dessert Chocolate", and "Parisian Coffee". Cowan paid special attention to the packaging of its products, to distinguish it as being of higher quality than the bulk products available at the time in Canada. It branded its cocoa powder as "Cowan's Perfection Cocoa." In 1898, Cowan adopted the maple leaf as its logo and used the "Maple Leaf" name for its chocolates. During this period, its factory was located at 468 King Street West in Toronto.

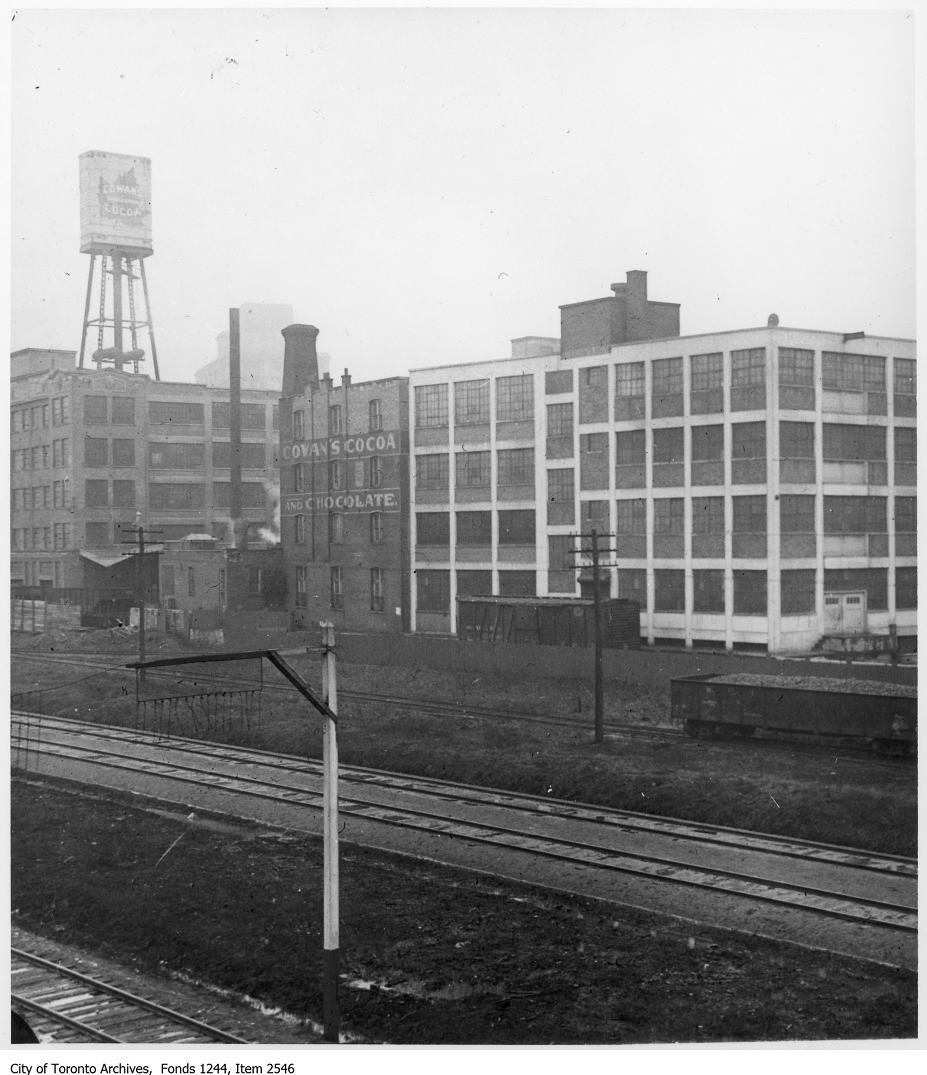
View of Cowan's Cocoa and Chocolate plant in 1922

The first decade of the 1900s had both success and disappointments. The company doubled production. In 1902, the company began exporting its chocolates to the United States to great success. After objections from American manufacturers, the U.S. raised tariffs in 1903 and shut out Cowan from the U.S. market. In 1905, after outgrowing its factory on King Street West in Toronto, the company built a new factory on Stirling Road (today's Sterling Road) on a 1 acre (0.40 ha) site. Situated along the main Canadian Pacific Railway, it originally received its sugar from the Redpath Sugar refinery on Toronto Harbour by rail.

John Cowan died in April 1908 at his home at 105 St. George St, at the age of 68 after a long illness. The company passed to his son Herbert Norton Cowan.

The company promoted its products with cookbooks, first distributing The Housekeeper's Perfect Account Book in 1905 including advertisements by the company. The company then published several cookbooks of recipes for its cocoa products during the 1910s and early 1920s, beginning with Dainty and Delicious Dishes Prepared from Cowan's Cocoa in 1915.

In 1914, Cowan donated 5,000 pounds (2,300 kg) of chocolate to the Canadian military for use in emergency rations. It sold similar tins of chocolate as "Chocolate For Our Soldiers." A number of Cowan's men enlisted in the Canadian military. They were given their jobs back and in 1920 they were feted at a celebration at the factory. Each man received a life insurance policy valued between CA$500 to CA$1,500 depending on their length of service to the company.

One well-known promotion of the company was picture trading cards, similar to the cards included in gum or tobacco packages. On each card was a painted illustration. Several series were produced, including cats, dogs, animals, people of the world, military figures and aviation. These were included in packages of Royal Milk Chocolate and Mell-O-Milk Chocolate bars. A full set of cards could be traded in for a large print. The cards are still collected today.

The company was sold for CA$1 million in 1926 to the English Rowntree's Company. At the time, the plant employed 400 workers and had revenues of CA$2 million annually. The plant continued production of the Cowan's chocolate bars including the "Maple Buds" packet of small milk chocolates. Eventually, the Cowan name disappeared from its product lineup. Long after the other Cowan's chocolates were discontinued, the Maple Buds packet of chocolate was continuously produced into the latter half of the 20th Century, discontinued after the Nestlé purchase.

Herbert Cowan did not continue with the new owners. In retirement, he was known to give away Maple Buds chocolate to children. He died in 1960 at the age of 82.

The factory diversified into making Rowntree Mackintosh toffees and chocolates. The company originated the Aero, Coffee Crisp, Kit Kat and Smarties milk chocolate products, producing these for Canadian consumption. In 1988, the Rowntree's Company was purchased by the Swiss Nestlé corporation as part of a purchase of Rowntree's worldwide assets and the factory was rebadged to the new company.

Most of the factory buildings survive as part of the Nestlé chocolate factory complex on Sterling Road. It continues to make the Aero, Coffee Crisp, Kit Kat and Smarties chocolate candies for the Canadian market. It is estimated that the complex produces 640 million chocolate bars per year at the plant. In 2025, Jimmy Zee Distributors announced a relaunch of the "Maple Buds" chocolates.

== Products ==
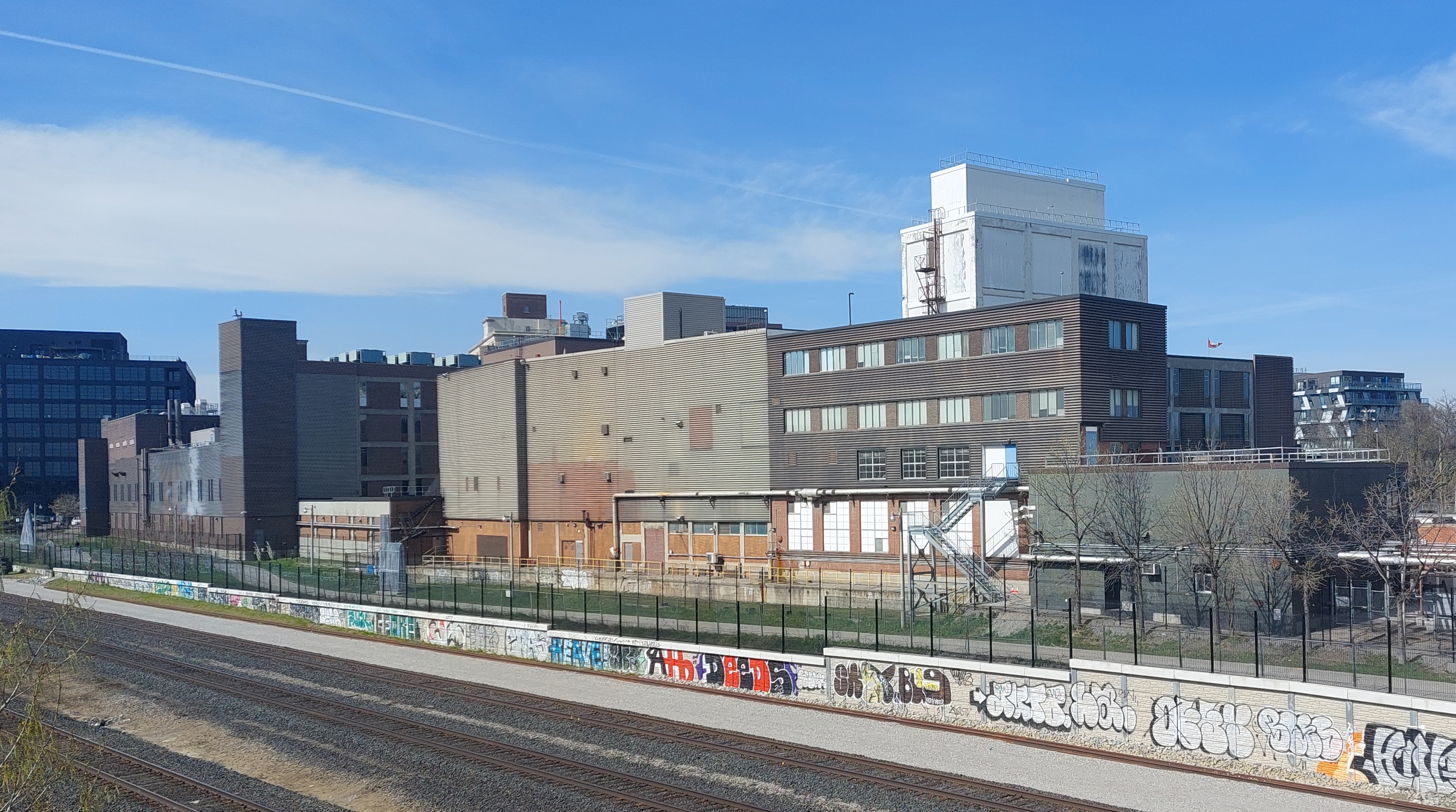
Nestle Toronto, Canada chocolate production factory. It incorporates the former Rowntree's and Cowan Company facility.

=== Food ===
- "Cowan's Instant Cocoa" - instant mix for cocoa drink
- "Cowan's Perfection Cocoa" tin of cocoa powder
- "Cowan's Famous Blend Coffee" roast coffee
- "Chocolate For Our Soldiers" box of milk chocolate and ginger chocolates
- Chocolate bars:
  - "Burnt Almond"
  - "Chocolate Ginger" chocolate bars with ginger flavouring
  - "Malt-o-Milk"
  - "Mell-o-Milk" in bars and rings
  - "Maple Buds" small box of small bud-shaped individual chocolates
  - "Nut Bar" milk chocolate
  - "Queen's Dessert Chocolate" dark chocolate

Reference: Cowan's Cocoa Insures a Wealth of Health recipe book, 1920

=== Cookbooks ===
- Dainty and Delicious Recipes prepared from Cowan's Cocoa and Chocolate (1915)
- Dainty and Delicious Recipes prepared from Cowan's Cocoa and Chocolate, 2nd ed. (1916)
- Dainty and Delicious Recipes prepared from Cowan's Cocoa and Chocolate, 3rd ed. (1918)
- Cowan's Cocoa Recipes (1921)
- Cowans' Book of Jingles
- Cowan's Cocoa Insures a Wealth of Health
- Cowan's Cocoa Makes Good Things to Eat
