= Smarts =

Smarts may refer to:

- SMARTS, market analysis and surveillance software by Nasdaq
- SMILES arbitrary target specification, a line notation language for specifying molecular query patterns
- Smarts Mountain, a mountain in New Hampshire
- Small and Medium Research Telescope System (SMARTS), a group of telescopes at Cerro Tololo Inter-American Observatory
- Simple Model of the Atmospheric Radiative Transfer of Sunshine or SMARTS, a computer programme

== See also ==
- Smart (disambiguation)
