= Smarty (film) =

1934 film by Robert Florey

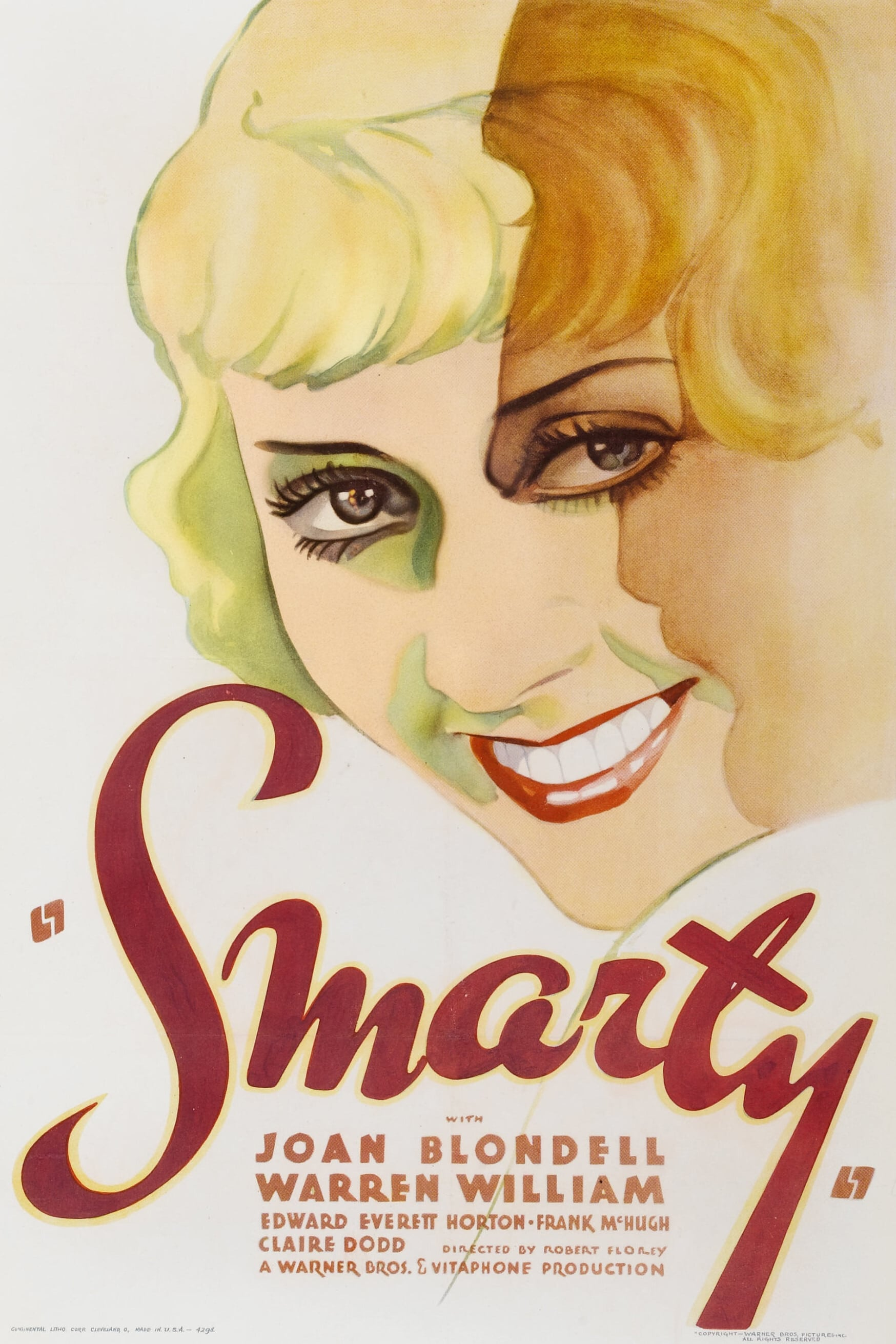
- Theatrical release poster
- Directed by: Robert Florey
- Written by: F. Hugh Herbert (play); Carl Erickson from Herbert's play
- Cinematography: George Barnes
- Edited by: Jack Killifer
- Distributed by: Warner Bros. Pictures
- Release date: May 19, 1934
- Running time: 65 minutes
- Country: United States
- Language: English

see also Smarties (disambiguation)

Smarty, known in the United Kingdom as Hit Me Again, is a 1934 American pre-Code comedy film directed by Robert Florey and starring Warren William and Joan Blondell. It was adapted from F. Hugh Herbert's play by Carl Erickson.

== Plot ==
Vicki Thorpe is happily married but with a habit of provocative teasing. One evening her teasing leads to a slap on the face from her husband. For this she engages her husband's friend and attorney Vernon to divorce him, marries Vernon, then begins to verbally tease him as well, wearing revealing clothes, and inviting her ex-husband over for dinner.

== Cast ==
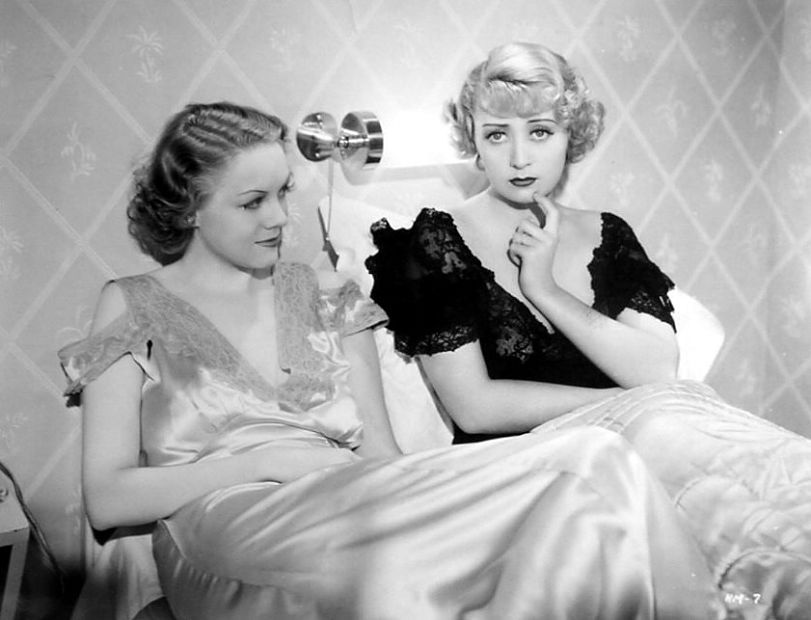
Claire Dodd and Joan Blondell in Smarty

- Joan Blondell as Vicki Wallace Thorpe
- Warren William as Tony Wallace
- Edward Everett Horton as Vernon Thorpe
- Frank McHugh as George Lancaster
- Claire Dodd as Nita
- Joan Wheeler as Mrs. Bonnie Durham
- Virginia Sale as Vicki's Maid
- Leonard Carey as Tony's Butler

== Reception ==
Contemporary reviews were mostly negative. Photoplay said, "There is a definitely light touch throughout the film, but it attempts to go dramatic in spots that ought to have been entirely devoted to humor." Vanity Fair said, "An almost incredibly painful attempt at farce, with Joan Blondell, Warren William and Edward Everett Horton making heavy-footed attempts to get through impossible lines and situations, and obviously very embarrassed about the whole thing, though not so much so as the audience."

Variety said it was "of moderate amusement value," while the Hollywood Reporter demurred, calling it "a light, happy, irresponsible little comedy, that twinkles and grins and occasionally even gets a little slapstick. It's lots of fun and is as inconsequential as the foam on a beer glass."

Modern viewers are split. Writer Sarah Cook notes they either find it to be "making light of domestic violence" or think it "delves into the kinkier side of sex in relationships with rich aplomb."
