= Smart Telecom (Uganda) =

Defunct private telecommunications company in Uganda

- Type: Private
- Industry: Telecommunications
- Founded: 2014
- Defunct: August 31, 2021
- Headquarters: Kampala, Uganda
- Area served: Uganda
- Services: Mobile voice, mobile data (2G, 3G)
- Owner: Industrial Promotion Services (Aga Khan Fund for Economic Development)
- Website: ug.smarteastafrica.com

Smart Telecom (Uganda) was a private telecommunications company in Uganda, operating from 2014 to August 31, 2021. Headquartered in Kampala, it offered low-cost mobile voice and 3G data services, primarily targeting price-sensitive urban customers. Owned by Industrial Promotion Services (IPS), a subsidiary of the Aga Khan Fund for Economic Development (AKFED), Smart Telecom struggled to compete with MTN Uganda and Airtel Uganda, exiting due to financial losses and increased challenges during the COVID-19 pandemic.

== History ==
Smart Telecom (Uganda) launched in March 2014 as the fifth mobile network operator in Uganda, after acquiring Sure Telecom’s license in 2013. Backed by AKFED’s IPS, it entered a market dominated by MTN and Airtel, offering a flat call rate of UGX 74 for any duration, the lowest in Uganda at the time. By 2015, Smart Telecom claimed a regional customer base of approximately 1 million, likely including Tanzania, though Ugandan numbers were smaller. Declining market share since 2019, compounded by COVID-19-related economic pressures, led to its closure on August 31, 2021.

== Operations and Services ==
Smart Telecom provided mobile voice and 3G data services, focusing on affordability with flat-rate calls and competitive data bundles, mainly in Kampala and urban areas. It leased spectrum and infrastructure from larger operators, resulting in limited coverage and occasional network outages. At its peak, Smart Telecom likely served 100,000–200,000 customers in Uganda, estimated from its Tanzanian decline from 1.8 million to 132,400 by 2019. Its services targeted budget-conscious users but faced challenges with reliability and reach.

== Financial Performance ==
Smart Telecom incurred persistent financial losses due to high spectrum leasing costs, infrastructure investments, and competition from MTN and Airtel, which controlled over 90% of Uganda’s mobile market by 2021. Financial strain, exacerbated by COVID-19, drove its 2021 closure.

== Legacy ==
Smart Telecom (Uganda) ceased operations on August 31, 2021, without being acquired, leaving minimal impact on Uganda’s telecom sector. Its customers and spectrum were absorbed by MTN, Airtel, and other operators like Axian Telecom, which expanded infrastructure post-2021. Smart Telecom’s low-cost strategy temporarily influenced competitors’ pricing but highlighted the challenges for smaller telecoms in Uganda’s competitive market.

== See also ==
- List of mobile network operators in Uganda
- MTN Uganda
- Airtel Uganda
- Uganda Communications Commission
- Telecommunications in Uganda
