= Smarties Candy Company =

American confectionery company

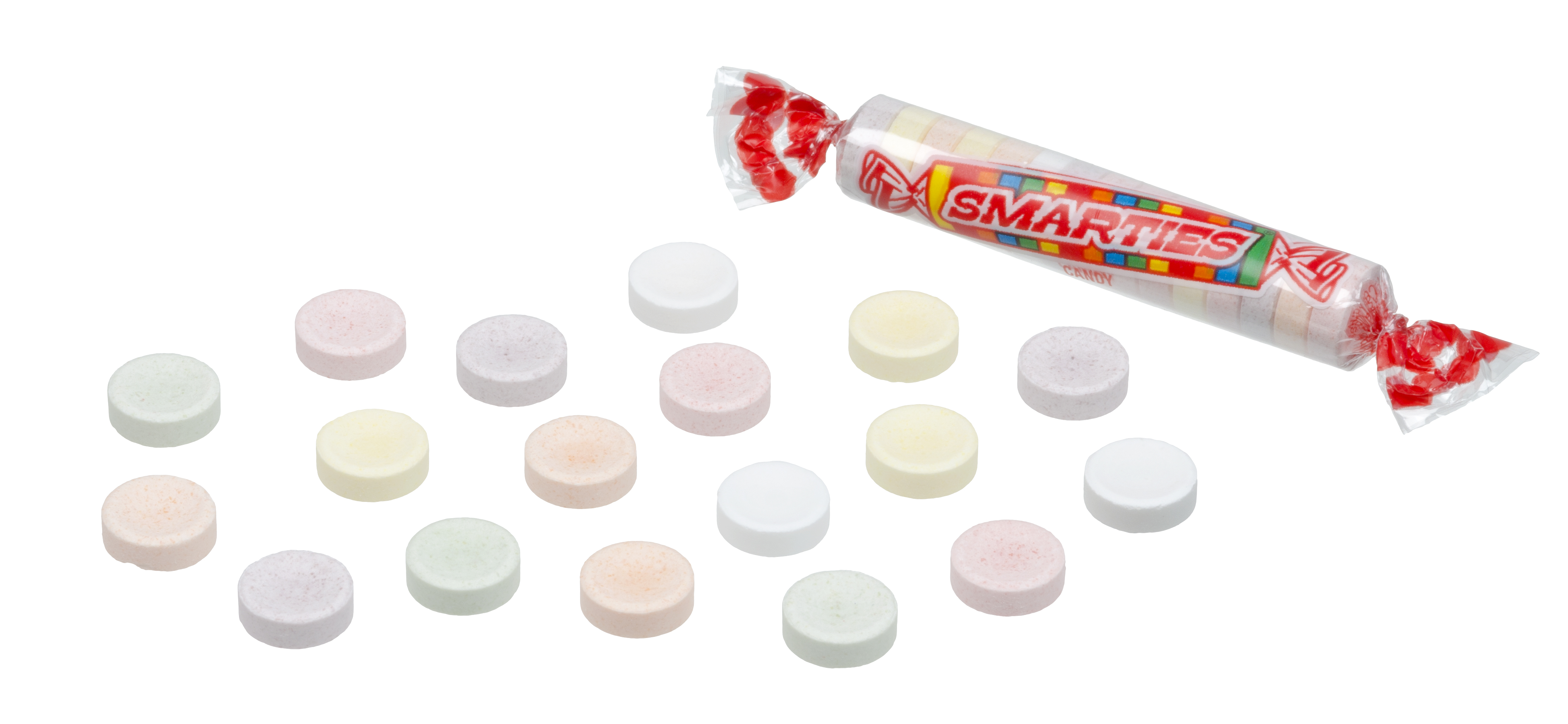
- Smarties tablet candies in roll (right) and loose (left).
- Formerly: Ce De Candy, Inc.
- Type: Private
- Industry: Confectionery
- Founded: 1949; 77 years ago
- Founder: Edward Dee
- Headquarters: Union, New Jersey, United States
- Key people: Sarah Dee (co-president); Jessica Dee Sawyer (co-president); Liz Dee (co-president)
- Products: Smarties
- Revenue: US$15 million (2021)
- Number of employees: 100
- Website: smarties.com

Smarties Candy Company (formerly Ce De Candy, Inc.) is a confectionery company well known for its namesake candy, Smarties. Edward "Eddie" Dee founded Ce De Candy in Bloomfield, New Jersey, in 1949. Dee emigrated from England to the United States.

Edward Dee's granddaughters, Sarah Dee, Jessica Dee Sawyer and Liz Dee serve as co-presidents of the company. Smarties Candy Company operates plants in Union Township, New Jersey, and in Newmarket, Ontario, Canada. The Canadian operations were initially located at 993 Queen Street West in Toronto in 1963 and moved to Newmarket in 1988. The old Toronto factory (c. 1907 east wing as fabric mill, c. 1920s west wing addition joined by central wing housing central heating and incinerator) is now the Candy Factory Lofts (conversion 1999). Its US headquarters are in Union Township. It is one of the few remaining family-owned, mass-production confectionery companies in the United States.

== History ==
On January 10, 1949, Edward Dee, a second generation candymaker from England, first began producing candy rolls in a rented New Jersey factory in Bloomfield with one wrapping machine and one tablet presser which was a repurposed pellet-making machine. Dee, a Cambridge University graduate, called his product "Smarties" to "encourage people to pursue an education." His family produces a similar candy in England through Swizzels Matlow Co. Initially, Dee took the candy by car to small grocery and tobacco stores. He later moved his American operations to Elizabeth, New Jersey, in 1959 and then again to its current location in Union Township in 1967.

Ce De Candy's Canadian operations were first established in Toronto, Ontario, in 1963, and were later moved to Newmarket in 1988. The Canadian candies go by the name Rockets to avoid confusion with Nestle's candy-coated chocolate Smarties. The company now produces Smarties around the clock in its two factories producing over 2.5 billion Smarties candy rolls per year.

In 1991, Mr. T and Ce De Candy collaborated to form Crusade for Kids. It encouraged kids to stay in school and say "no" to drugs. Crusade for Kids raised funds for the Children's Defense Fund charity. In October 2010, the company vice president of sales and marketing was inducted into the Candy Hall of Fame.

In 2011, the company changed its name from Ce De Candy, Inc. to Smarties Candy Company after its most famous product. The company launched its "Smarties Think" campaign in 2013 to promote education and help classrooms in need. Since 2013, the company has donated $200,000 through DonorsChoose to provide school supplies. The company completed a 674 kW solar project in 2016, adding 2,100 solar panels to the roof of their New Jersey factory. In October 2017, the company's president of 40 years, Jonathan Dee, stepped down and Liz Dee, Sarah Dee, and Jessica Dee Sawyer assumed the role of co-president. That same month, Smarties announced the #LittleSmarties campaign to promote intellectual curiosity which features historical figures including Jane Goodall, Marie Curie, and Amelia Earhart, as well as a partnership with DonorsChoose to support classrooms in need of funding.

== Products ==
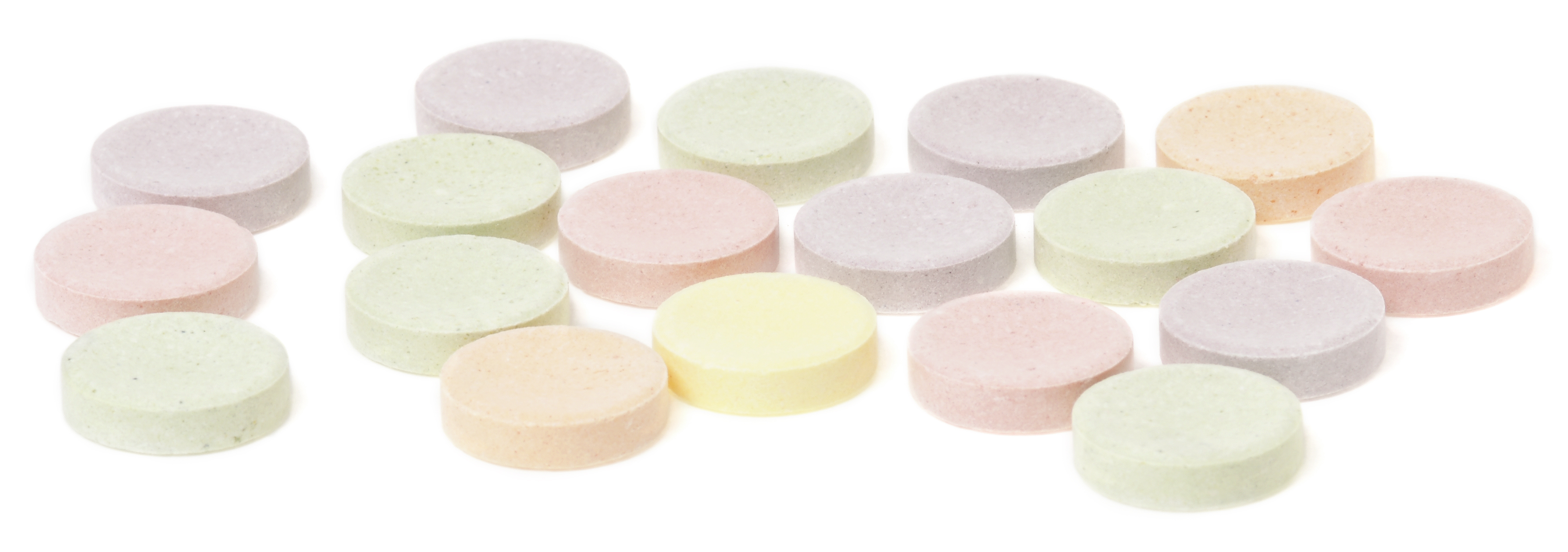
Giant-sized Smarties candies

The company also produces Mega Smarties, Giant Smarties, X-treme Sour Smarties, Tropical Smarties, Love Hearts, Smarties 'n Creme, candy necklaces, Smarties Pops in three sizes, and other candies, including Breath Savers. All Smarties products are peanut-free, gluten-free, dairy-free, and vegan.

While generally considered an everyday staple, groups also give out Smarties to encourage people to buckle up and drive safely. Among these are Tampa Bays' Students Against Destructive Decisions (SADD) and Dum Dum or Smartie initiatives in schools.
