= Smart Scotland =

Smart Scotland is a high profile innovation support grant scheme in Scotland aimed at small and medium-sized firms. It supports commercially viable projects which represent a significant technological advance for the UK sector or industry concerned.

The grant supports technology development through:

- Technical and Commercial Feasibility Studies. These should involve early stage R&D, the outcome of which will enable informed decisions on the technical and commercial feasibility of a new product or process.
- Research and Development Projects that aim to develop a pre-production prototype of a new product or process.

== Criteria ==
Applicants must be based in Scotland or planning to set up in Scotland and must meet the European Community definition of a small and medium-sized enterprise which in summary means they must:

- have less than 250 employees (full-time equivalent world-wide, including partners and executive directors) and have either
- an annual turnover not exceeding EUR 50 million and/or
- an annual balance sheet total not exceeding EUR 43 million.

Awards are judged according to technological, intellectual property, financial and commercial aspects of the application as well as the management expertise available to the business. In addition other aspects such as the project's implications on society such as environmental impact, sustainability and health and safety may be taken into account.

== History ==
The grant was launched in Scotland as SMART in 1999. By April 2007, grants had been given to almost 400 businesses across Scotland amounting to some £14.7 million funding. In April 2007, SMART was relaunched as the "SMART:SCOTLAND" Programme.

== See also ==
- Scottish Government
- Scottish Executive Enterprise, Transport and Lifelong Learning Department
- Economy of Scotland
