= Studies in Medieval and Renaissance Teaching =

- Discipline: Study of the Middle Ages and the Renaissance
- Language: English
- Edited by: Kristie Bixby

Publication details
- Former name(s): Ralph – A Newspaper for Undergraduate Teaching: Medieval and Renaissance Humanities
- History: 1974-present
- Publisher: Wichita State University (United States)
- Frequency: Biannually

Standard abbreviations
- ISO 4: Stud. Mediev. Renaiss. Teach.

Indexing
- ISSN: 1050-9739
- LCCN: 97641664
- OCLC no.: 8691683

Links
- Journal homepage; Online tables of content

Studies in Medieval and Renaissance Teaching (SMART) is a biannual peer-reviewed academic journal published by Wichita State University covering both theoretical and practical aspects of teaching in the Middle Ages and Renaissance. The journal publishes articles on scholarly and pedagogical topics. The editor-in-chief is Kristie Bixby (Wichita State University) and the journal adheres to the guidelines in The Chicago Manual of Style.

== History ==
The journal began as Ralph – A Newspaper for Undergraduate Teaching: Medieval and Renaissance Humanities, first published in 1974 at Kent State University, with Joanne Kantrowitz credited as the founding editor. Ralph moved to Central Missouri State University in 1977, and was edited by Robert Kindrick and Robert Graybill. Kindrick was to remain with the journal for decades, until his death in 2004. The name was changed to SMART in 1982. Up until the name was changed, it was published in newspaper format. In 1982 it changed to journal format and came out three times a year. Between 1980 and 1990 the journal also published four volumes of selected papers under the title Teaching the Middle Ages. These papers were culled from four different "Teaching the Middle Ages Conferences".

In 1990, SMART moved again, this time to Indiana State University and began to publish, only twice a year, with a new numbering (New Series). From 1993 to 1997 the journal was on hiatus, resuming publication at the University of Montana. In 2002 moved, with Robert Kindrick, to Wichita State University.
