= Smart (advertising agency) =

Australian advertising agency

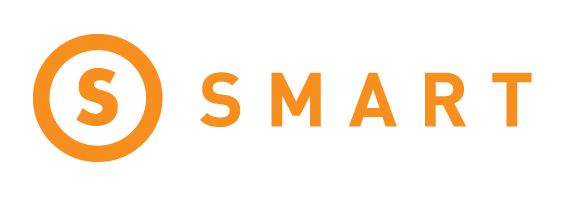
- Company type: Private
- Industry: Advertising
- Founded: 2000
- Founders: Ben Lilley; Paul Findlay; John Mescall
- Headquarters: Melbourne
- Number of locations: 3
- Services: Brand Advertising, Communication Strategy, Social Media and Digital Services
- Owner: Ben Lilley
- Website: smartinc.com

Smart is an Australian advertising agency with offices in Sydney, Melbourne and Brisbane launched in 2000. Over the next decade the business grew to become Australia's largest independent agency.

== Overview ==
Smart was established by a group of ex-multinational agency professionals. The agency's founding partners were creative directors Ben Lilley, Paul Findlay and John Mescall. Lilley is a media commentator, particularly in the area of youth marketing,. He was named one of AdNews's forty top industry professionals under forty and his agency became the most awarded in the world.

The founding partners were each under 30 when they set up the agency. Marketing magazine B&T named Smart the New Age ad agency in its Agency of the Year awards.

In 2011, McCann Worldgroup acquired Smart and replaced the management of McCann Worldgroup Australia with the management team from Smart. In 2020, Smart was acquired back from McCann Worldgroup by Ben Lilley, who runs it as an independent advertising agency once again today.

== Clients ==
Smart was appointed by Australian brand Mambo, a client who had previously refused to work with advertising agencies. It has also undertaken several unconventional stunts, including sending dwarves to the headquarters of Peugeot in an effort to secure a spot on the car maker's agency pitch list. A stunt that involved agency staff disguising themselves as takeaway delivery drivers to post recruitment advertisements inside competing agencies also raised eyebrows.

== Awards ==
Smart was named B&T Agency of the Year and has featured in the Business Review Weekly Fast100 list of Australia's fastest growing businesses. The agency is known for taking a selective approach to its clients, focusing on blue-chip creative advertisers. Smart's founders created the most awarded campaign in the history of the Cannes Lions International Festival of Creativity, Dumb Ways to Die.
