= Tableting =

Method of pressing medicine or candy into tablets

Tableting is a method of pressing medicine or candy into tablets. Confectionery manufacture shares many similarities with pharmaceutical production.

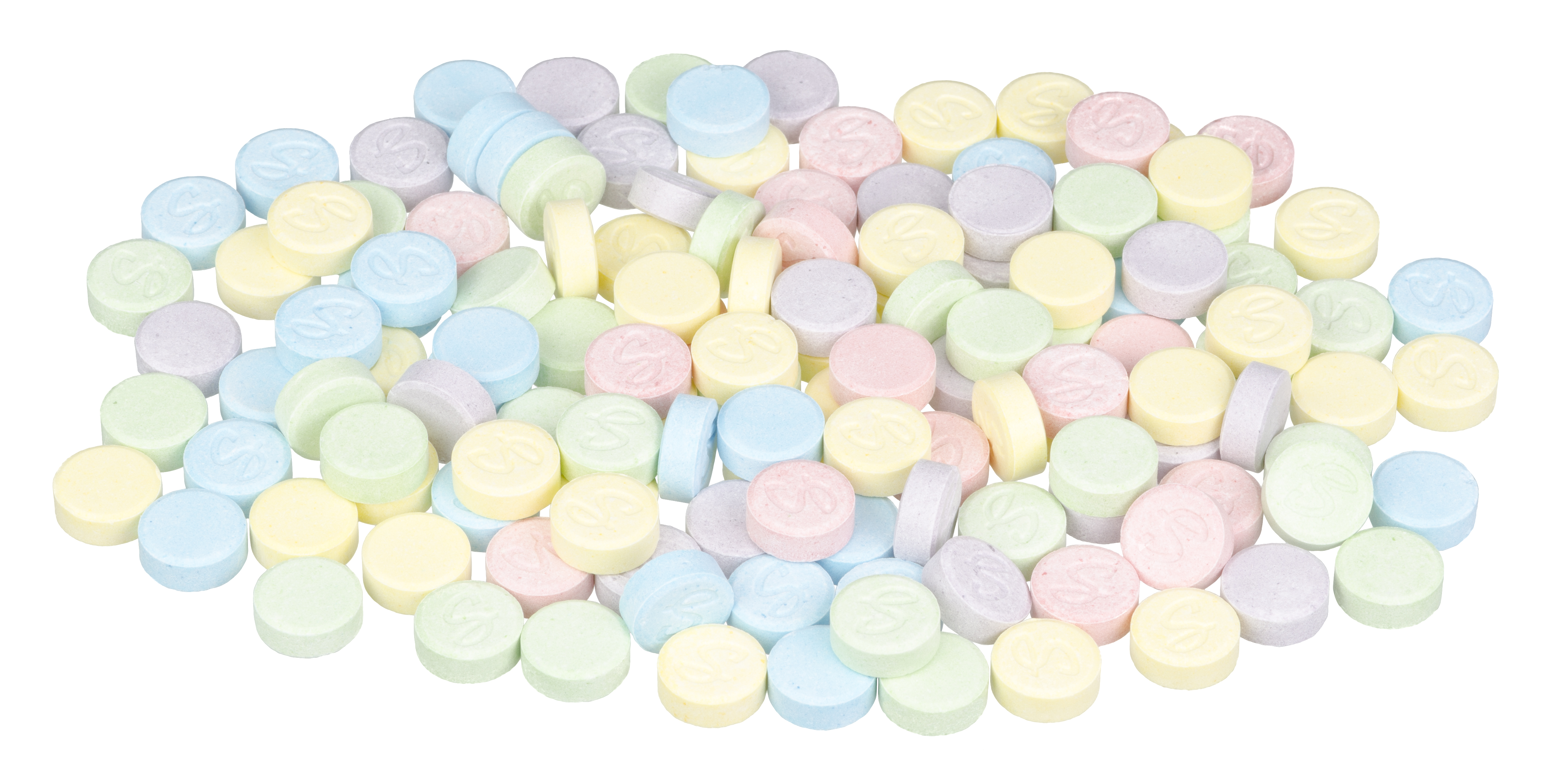
SweeTarts, an example of a tablet candy

A powder or granule mixture is prepared, a die mold is filled, and then the mixture is compressed and ejected. While drug tablets are constrained to shapes and sizes that can be swallowed easily, candy tablets are designed to be chewable and can take a wider variety of shapes and sizes.

Examples of tablet candy include Smarties, SweeTarts, and Necco Wafers.

The tablet pressing operation

== Introduction ==
The manufacture of oral solid dosage forms such as tablets is a complex multi-stage process under which the starting materials change their physical characteristics a number of times before the final dosage form is produced.

Traditionally, tablets have been made by granulation, a process that imparts two primary requisites to formulate: compatibility and fluidity. Both wet granulation and dry granulation (slugging and roll compaction) are used. The first step, milling and mixing, is the same whether making tablets by direct compression or granulation; subsequent steps vary.

Numerous unit processes are involved in making tablets, including particle size reduction and sizing, blending, granulation, drying, compaction, and (frequently) coating. Various factors associated with these processes can seriously affect content uniformity, bioavailability, or stability.

== 1-Sizing ==
Sizing (size reduction, milling, crushing, grinding, pulverization) is an important step in the process of tablet manufacturing.

In manufacturing of compressed tablets, the mixing or blending of several solid pharmaceutical ingredients is easier and more uniform if the ingredients are about the same size. This provides a greater uniformity of dose. A fine particle size is essential in the case of lubricant mixing with granules for its proper function.

Advantages of smaller tablets are as follows:

- Increased surface area, which may enhance an active ingredient's dissolution rate and hence bioavailability
- Improved tablet-to-tablet content uniformity due to a larger number of particles per unit weight
- Controlled particle size distribution of dry granulation or mix to promote better flow of mixture in tablet machine
- Improved flow properties of raw materials
- Improved colour and/or active ingredient dispersion in tablet excipients
- Uniformly sized wet granulation to promote uniform drying

The following problems may arise if the process is not controlled properly:

- A possible change in polymorphic form of the active ingredient, rendering it less or totally inactive, or unstable
- A decrease in bulk density of active compound and/or excipients, which may cause flow problem and segregation in the mix
- An increase in surface area from size reduction may promote the adsorption of air, which may inhibit wettability of the drug to the extent that it becomes the limiting factor in dissolution rate

Various types of machine may be used for the dry sizing or milling process, depending on whether gentle screening or particle milling is needed. The range of equipment employed for this process includes:

- Fluid energy mill
- Colloidal mill
- Ball mill
- Hammer mill
- Cutting mill
- Roller mill
- Conical mill

== Powder blending ==
The successful mixing of powder is more difficult than mixing liquid, as perfect homogeneity is difficult to achieve. Another problem is the inherent cohesiveness and resistance to movement between the individual particles. The process is further complicated in many systems by the presence of substantial segregation influencing the powder mix. This arises from the difference in size, shape, and density of the component particles. The powder/granules may be blended at the pre-granulation and/or post-granulation stage of tablet manufacturing. Each process of mixing has an optimum mixing time, and longer mixing may result in an undesired product. The optimum mixing time and speed must be evaluated. Blending prior to compression is normally achieved in a simple tumble blender. This be a fixed blender into which the powders are charged, blended and discharged. It is now common to use a bin blender from which the container (bin) can be removed and brought directly to other processing steps. In special cases of mixing a lubricant, overmixing should be particularly monitored. The various blenders used include the "V" blender, oblicone blender, container blender, tumbling blender, and agitated powder blender.

Nowadays, to optimize the manufacturing process, particularly in wet granulation, various improved pieces of equipment which combines several processing steps (mixing, granulation and/or drying) are used. These are the mixer granulator and high shear mixing machine.

== Granulation ==
Following particle size reduction and blending, the formulation may be granulated, which provides homogeneity of drug distribution in the blend. This process is very important and needs experience to attain proper quality of granules before tableting. Quality of granule determines the smooth and trouble free process of tablets manufacturing. If granulation is not done in a proper manner, the resulting mixture may damage the tableting press.

== Drying ==
Drying is an important step in the formulation and development of a pharmaceutical product. It is important to keep the residual moisture low enough to prevent product deterioration and ensure free flowing properties. The commonly used dryers include the fluidized-bed dryer, vacuum tray dryer, microwave dryer, spray dryer, freeze dryer, turbo-tray dryer, and pan dryer.

== Tablet compression ==
=== Tablet press ===
After the preparation of granules (in wet granulation) or sized slugs (in dry granulation) or mixing of ingredients (in direct compression), they are compressed to get the final product. The compression is done either by a single-punch machine (also called stamping press, achieves an output of approximately 200 tablets per minute, making it ideal for manufacturing small batches of tablets) or by a multi-station machine (rotary press). The tablet press is a high-speed mechanical device. It squeezes the ingredients into the required tablet shape with extreme precision. It can make the tablet in many shapes, although they are usually round or oval. Also, it can press the name of the manufacturer or the product into the top of the tablet.

Stage 1: Top punch is withdrawn from the die by the upper cam. Bottom punch is low in the die so powder falls in through the hole and fills the die.

Stage 2: Bottom punch moves up to adjust the powder weight. It raises and expels some powder.

Stage 3: Top punch is driven into the die by upper cam. Bottom punch is raised by lower cam. Both punch heads pass between heavy rollers to compress the powder.

Stage 4: Top punch is withdrawn by the upper cam. Lower punch is pushed up and expels the tablet, which is removed from the die surface by surface plate.

Stage 5: Return to stage 1.

=== Tablet testing ===
The physical properties of a tablet are tested either by manual or automated sampling and IPC testing (in-process control). Tablet "hardness", also called "breaking force", is tested to assure that the tablet's strength will survive all further processes, such as dedusting, coating and packaging. The hardness value of a tablet gives an early indication of the tablet's disintegration time. Further measured parameters are weight, thickness, diameter, disintegration time, friability, and abrasion.

Friability and abrasion testing is performed in rotating testing drums, designed according to the pharmacopeia. The measured parameter is weight loss before and after testing and tumbling the tablets at a particular time and speed. In the friability test drum tablets are being carried up by a "shovel" and dropped. Tablets are also not allowed to fall apart during the test. In the abrasion test, drum tablets are not falling/dropping, but rolling on the ground of the test drum and losing weight due to the friction between tablets.

=== Tablet deduster ===
In almost all cases, tablets coming out of a tablet machine have excess powder on their surface which is removed by passing them through a tablet deduster. The machine works by passing the tablets through a rotating perforated drum with compressed air that removes any loose powder or debris from the surface of the tablets. It ensures that the tablets are clean and uniform, and ready for further processing, packaging, and distribution.

=== Fette machine ===
The Fette machine chills the compression components to allow the compression of low-melting point substances such as waxes, thereby making it possible to compress products with low melting points.

== Physical features of compressed tablets ==
Compressed tablets can be round, oblong, or unique in shape; thick or thin; large or small in diameter; flat or convex; unscored or scored in halves, thirds, or quadrants; engraved or imprinted with an identifying symbol and/or code number; coated or uncoated; colored or uncolored; one, two, or three layered.

Tablet diameters and shapes are determined by the dies and punches used in compression. The less concave the punches, the flatter the tablets; conversely, the more concave the punches, the more convex the resulting tablets. Punches with raised impressions produce recessed impressions on the tablets; punches with recessed etchings produce tablets with raised impressions or monograms. Logos may be placed on one or on both sides of a tablet, depending on the punches.

== Packaging ==
Tablets must be packaged before they can be sent out for distribution. The type of packaging depends on the formulation of the medicine.

Blister packs are a common form of packaging. They are safe and easy to use, and the user can see the contents without opening the pack. Many pharmaceutical companies use a standard size of blister pack. This saves the cost of different tools and changing the production machinery between products. Sometimes the pack may be perforated so that individual tablets can be detached. This means that the expiry date and the drug's name must be printed on each part of the package. The blister pack itself must remain absolutely flat as it travels through the packaging processes, especially when it is inserted into a carton. Extra ribs are added to the blister pack to improve its stiffness.

== Key phases ==
The manufacturing of tablet involves numerous unit processes, including:

- Particle size reduction and sizing
- Blending
- Granulation
- Drying
- Compaction
- Testing of physical properties
- Coating
