= Lisa Smart (disambiguation) =

Lisa Smart may refer to:

- Lisa Smart (fl. 21st century), Liberal Democrat politician from Greater Manchester
- Lisa Smart (American politician) (fl. 21st century), Republican politician from New Hampshire
- Lisa Smart (fl. 21st century), Republican politician from Missouri, elected recorder for Franklin County, Missouri, USA

== See also ==
- SMART-2 LISA Pathfinder; a European Space Agency space mission in the SMART programme, a LISA technology demonstrator for a gravity-wave space telescope; the SMART mission for LISA
- Elizabeth Smart (disambiguation)
- Liz Smart (disambiguation)
