= Coalition Avenir Québec candidates in the 2014 Quebec provincial election =

The Coalition Avenir Québec (CAQ) fielded 122 candidates in the 2014 Quebec provincial election and won twenty-two (22) seats to retain their position as the third-largest party in the National Assembly of Quebec.

The party did not field candidates in Saint-Laurent, Soulanges, or Westmount–Saint-Louis.

Riding	Candidate's Name	Residence	Occupation	Votes	%	Rank	Notes
Abitibi-Est	Sylvain Martel			3,927	19.04	3rd	
Abitibi-Ouest	Nadia Racine			3,084	14.05	3rd	
Acadie	Serge Pourreaux			3,050	8.94	3rd	
Anjou–Louis-Riel	Richard Campeau			5,315	16.83	3rd	
Argenteuil	Nicole Chouinard			7,212	23.62	3rd	
Arthabaska	Sylvie Roy			19,393	45.49	1st	Incumbent MNA.
Beauce-Nord	André Spénard			15,761	50.89	1st	Incumbent MNA.
Beauce-Sud	Samuel Poulin			12,909	38.22	2nd	
Beauharnois	Claude Moreau			7,035	22.98	3rd	
Bellechasse	Stéphanie Lachance			10,668	33.18	2nd	
Berthier	Élizabeth Leclerc			11,814	31.04	2nd	
Berthier	Robert Milot			10,985	26.93	2nd	
Blainville	Mario Laframboise			15,075	33.92	1st	Bloc Québécois member of the House of Commons of Canada from 2000 to 2011.
Bonaventure	Jean-Marc Landry			1,061	4.26	4th	
Borduas	Simon Jolin-Barrette			14,331	33.50	1st	
Bourassa-Sauvé	Fabrizio Del Fabbro			3,624	12.24	3rd	
Bourget	Sylvain Medza			6,510	19.64	3rd	
Brome-Missisquoi	François Lemay			11,349	27.90	2nd	
Chambly	Jean-François Roberge			12,130	34.24	1st	
Champlain	Andrew D'Amours			10,569	30.43	2nd	
Chapleau	Carl Pelletier			5,022	14.74	3rd	
Charlesbourg	Denise Trudel			13,053	32.43	2nd	Incumbent MNA.
Charlevoix–Côte-de-Beaupré	Ian Latrémouille			9,682	26.08	3rd	
Châteauguay	Claudia Cloutier			7,292	20.24	3rd	
Chauveau	Gérard Deltell			22,679	52.41	1st	Incumbent MNA.
Chicoutimi	Jean-Francois Doyon			5,691	17.45	3rd	
Chomedey	Carlie Dejoie			4,658	11.11	3rd	
Chutes-de-la-Chaudière	Marc Picard			21,288	47.70	1st	Incumbent MNA.
Côte-du-Sud	Mireille Caron			8,093	23.27	2nd	
Crémazie	Sylvain Bessette			4,731	13.73	3rd	
D'Arcy-McGee	Elizabeth Smart			716	2.45	2nd	
Deux-Montagnes	Benoit Charette			11,868	34.16	1st	MNA from 2008 to 2012.
Drummond–Bois-Francs	Sébastien Schneeberger			13,600	39.92	1st	Incumbent MNA.
Dubuc	Claudie Emond			5,240	18.88	3rd	
Duplessis	Christine Pinard			2,898	13.01	3rd	
Fabre	Christopher Skeete			6,667	17.83	3rd	
Gaspé	Yvan Blanchard			1,192	6.19	3rd	
Gatineau	André Paradis			5,198	14.01	3rd	
Gouin	Paul Franche			2,748	8.67	4th	
Granby	François Bonnardel			18,441	53.04	1st	Incumbent MNA
Groulx	Claude Surprenant			12,776	30.85	1st	
Hochelaga-Maisonneuve	Brendan Walsh			3,097	11.95	4th	
Hull	Jean Bosco Citegetse			3,609	10.93	4th	
Huntingdon	Claire IsaBelle			6,875	23.65	2nd	
Iberville	Claire Samson			11,135	34.23	1st	
Îles-de-la-Madeleine	Mario-Michel Jomphe			262	3.17	4th	
Jacques-Cartier	Laurence Desroches			2,128	5.90	2nd	
Jean-Lesage	Émilie Foster			7,431	23.78	2nd	
Jean-Talon	Hugues Beaulieu			7,158	20.56	3rd	
Jeanne-Mance–Viger	Mario Parent			2,820	8.20	3rd	
Johnson	André Lamontagne			13,621	36.06	1st	
Joliette	Denise Larouche			10,671	27.07	2nd	
Jonquière	Mélanie Boucher			7,318	23.61	3rd	
L'Assomption	François Legault			18,719	49.38	1st	Party leader and incumbent MNA.
La Peltrie	Éric Caire			21,386	50.33	1st	Incumbent MNA.
La Pinière	Jin Kim			5,600	12.58	3rd	
La Prairie	Stéphane Le Bouyonnec			10,675	32.62	2nd	
Labelle	Cedrick Remy-Quevedo			6,447	21.09	3rd	
Lac-Saint-Jean	Élise Marchildon			5,412	18.32	3rd	
LaFontaine	Julie Di Battista Manseau			3,303	10.77	3rd	
Laporte	Donald LeBlanc			5,919	17.85	3rd	
Laurier-Dorion	Valérie Assouline			2,431	7.21	4th	
Laval-des-Rapides	Vincent Bolduc			6,552	17.16	3rd	
Laviolette	Sylvain Gauthier			4,432	18.76	3rd	
Lévis	Christian Dubé			14,131	40.49	1st	Incumbent MNA.
Lotbinière-Frontenac	Luc de la Sablonnière			11,735	29.77	2nd	
Louis-Hébert	Mario Asselin			9,650	25.92	2nd	
Marguerite-Bourgeoys	Zoubir Bouchaala			3,711	9.91	3rd	
Marie-Victorin	Guillaume Provencher			6,269	20.60	3rd	
Marquette	Marc Thériault			4,358	13.39	3rd	
Maskinongé	Martin Poisson			9,846	28.29	2nd	
Masson	Mathieu Lemay			13,235	38.35	1st	
Matane-Matapédia	Yann Gobeil-Nadon			3,019	10.24	3rd	
Mégantic	Pierre-Luc Boulanger			6,078	22.87	3rd	
Mercier	Alain Clavet		Journalist	2,400	8.38	4th	Clavet had previously run for Équipe Denis Coderre pour Montréal in Mile-End in the 2013 Montreal municipal election.
Mille-Îles	Sylvain Loranger			5,757	17.62	3rd	
Mirabel	Sylvie D'Amours			16,359	39.24	1st	
Mont-Royal	Jamilla Leboeuf			2,020	6.94	2nd	
Montarville	Nathalie Roy			14,999	35.04	1st	
Montmorency	Michelyne St-Laurent			14,323	33.83	2nd	Incumbent MNA
Nelligan	Albert Bitton			4,303	9.47	2nd	
Nicolet-Bécancour	Donald Martel			11,168	38.64	1st	
Notre-Dame-de-Grâce	Noah Sidel			1,649	5.66	3rd	
Orford	Marc-Alexandre Bourget			6,227	21.03	3rd	
Outremont	Rebecca McCann			2,252	8.26	4th	
Papineau	René Langelier			5,860	16.10	3rd	
Pointe-aux-Trembles	Mathieu Binette			6,692	24.06	2nd	
Pontiac	Michel Mongeon			3,026	8.93	2nd	
Portneuf	Jacques Marcotte			11,720	37.99	2nd	Incumbent MNA.
René-Lévesque	Marie-Christine Fortin-Morand			3,152	15.72	3rd	
Repentigny	Lise Lavallée			13,889	36.07	1st	
Richelieu	Martin Baller			8,036	26.81	2nd	
Richmond	Alain Dion			9,197	22.04	3rd	
Rimouski	Steven Fleurent			3,186	10.75	4th	
Rivière-du-Loup–Témiscouata	Charles Roy			5,794	16.56	3rd	
Robert-Baldwin	Jamie Allen			2,161	5.13	2nd	
Roberval	François Truchon			2,239	6.93	3rd	
Rosemont	Carl Dubois			5,252	14.16	4th	
Rosseau	Claude Charette			14,667	36.70	2nd	
Rouyn-Noranda–Témiscamingue	Bernard Flebus			4,839	17.27	3rd	
Saint-François	Gaston Stratford			6,607	17.09	3rd	
Saint-Henri–Sainte-Anne	Louis-Philippe Boulanger			4,218	11.19	3rd	
Saint-Hyacinthe	Chantal Soucy			13,245	32.74	1st	
Saint-Jean	Serge Tremblay			12,923	31.08	2nd	
Saint-Jérôme	Patrice Charbonneau			11,685	31.52	2nd	
Saint-Maurice	Stéphane Mongeau			6,982	28.45	3rd	
Sainte-Marie–Saint-Jacques	Patrick Thauvette			2,364	8.57	4th	
Sainte-Rose	Domenico Cavaliere			9,413	24.05	3rd	
Sanguinet	Denis Leftakis			9,147	31.77	2nd	
Sherbrooke	Philippe Girard			5,672	16.69	3rd	
Taillon	Sébastien Vaillancourt			8,704	24.22	3rd	
Taschereau	Steve Brabant			5,865	16.32	3rd	
Terrebonne	Jean-François Jarry			13,707	34.36	2nd	
Trois-Rivières	Diego Brunelle			6,634	22.28	3rd	
Ungava	Michael Donald Cameron			1,800	16.51	3rd	
Vachon	Stéphane Robichaud			9,164	25.28	3rd	
Vanier-Les Rivières	Sylvain Lévesque			14,535	34.48	2nd	Incumbent MNA.
Vaudreuil	Luc Tison			7,084	15.62	3rd	
Verchères	Yves Renaud			13,160	30.35	2nd	
Verdun	Benoit Richer			4,151	12.23	3rd	
Viau	Wilner Cayo			2,380	9.26	4th	
Vimont	Joseph Dydzak			6,632	19.04	3rd	
