= Scandinavian Multi Access Reservations for Travel Agents =

SMART, Scandinavian Multi Access Reservations for Travel Agents, is a computerized system for ticket reservation.

== History ==
SMART was created in 1979 by SAS, Braathens and Swedish State Railways. Many travel companies had computerized their systems at the time, and provided terminal interfaces for travel agencies. SMART provided a single interface over the public data network Datex.

It implemented a Host Interface Processor (HIP) at each travel company that would emulate a number of terminals, translate messages, codes and addresses, wrap them in SMART's own communications protocol, and provide the interface over Datex to the various travel agencies. There was functionality to limit access.

On the travel agency side, there is SMART Terminal Equipment (STE) with the reverse function, emulating a server and providing interfaces for terminals. Now a travel agent could easily switch between screens for the different companies. The interfaces were similar to those for direct connections, but provided some standardization for codes to ease the transition between the systems. STE can also print documents, tickets, and bills, and interfaces with the accounting system.

The third component in the SMART system is the SMART Control Centre (SCC). It monitors the status of all STEs and reports suspected errors in the STE hardware or communication lines. Furthermore, it can remotely configure the STEs, download application software and/or operating system, and reboot the computers - all automatically without any intervention.

All three SMART system components were delivered by Philips Data Systems. The HIP processors were Philips PTS 6813 and 6824 minicomputers, the STE travel agent front-office computers were Philips PTS 6911 workstation controllers, and the SCC consisted of a Philips PTS 6813 minicomputer.

SMART could utilize some of Datex extra features like queuing and group numbers, and a logical connection (session) was not dependent on the physical connection (which could go up and down for instance during idle times to save money). Parallel sessions could be held with different or the same provider.

SMART spawned off into a company centered in Stockholm in 1984, SMART AB, with the subsidiaries SMART Sverige AB, SMART Danmark A/S, and SMART Norge AS (in Sweden, Denmark and Norway respectively).

SMART is still in use, though not over Datex. It has been widely replaced by Amadeus, by the same company. In 2003, SMART AB changed its name to Amadeus Scandinavia.

== See also ==
- Travel technology
