= Smarties =

British chocolate confectionery

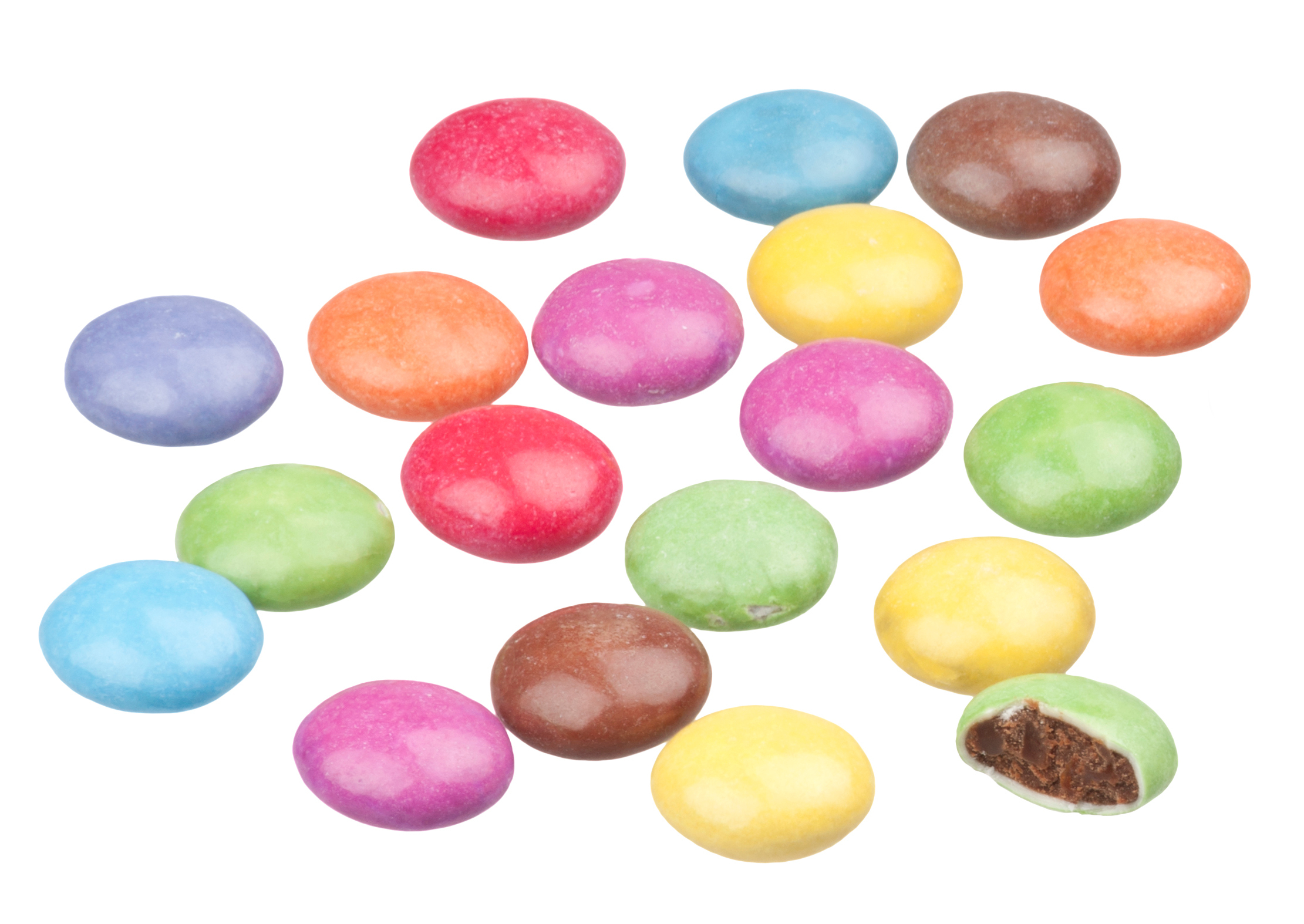
- Current owner: Nestlé
- Country: United Kingdom
- Introduced: 1882; 144 years ago (as Chocolate Beans); 1937; 89 years ago
- Markets: Europe, Canada, South Africa, Australia, Middle East, Philippines, Thailand, Indonesia, Malaysia, Japan, South Korea
- Previous owners: Rowntree's
- Website: nestle.com/brands/allbrands/smarties smarties.co.uk www.smarties.de

Smarties are dragée chocolate confections marketed by Swiss company Nestlé. They were first manufactured in 1937 by British company H.I. Rowntree & Company of York. British production was discontinued in 2007, moving to Hamburg, Germany.

Smarties are oblate spheroids with a minor axis of about 5 mm (0.2 in) and a major axis of about 12 mm (0.5 in). They come in eight colours: red, orange, yellow, green, blue, violet, pink and brown. Blue Smarties were temporarily replaced by white ones in 2005, due to concerns about the safety of the synthetic dyes in food.

Smarties are sold in many regions around the world, but are not distributed (except via parallel import) in the United States, where the trademark name is held by the Smarties Candy Company. Their product, also called Smarties, is a hard tablet candy with no filling.

== History ==
Confectionery company Rowntree's of York, England, have been making "Chocolate Beans" since at least 1882. In 1937, they renamed the product "Smarties Chocolate Beans", soon shortening the name to just "Smarties". The sweets had previously been sold loose, but as part of a broader strategy to establish a prominent brand identity and after seeing success in selling other confections in cardboard tubes, Rowntree's began selling Smarties Chocolate Beans in tubes after test marketing it in Scotland. The packaging was valued for being easily repurposed into crafts and the plastic caps, each marked with a letter of the alphabet, were collectible.

A 1947 agreement between Rowntree's and Mars caused Rowntree's to keep Smarties out of the US market (where they would compete with Mars' M&Ms), in exchange for the right for Rowntree's to make Mars bars for the Canadian, Irish, and South African markets.

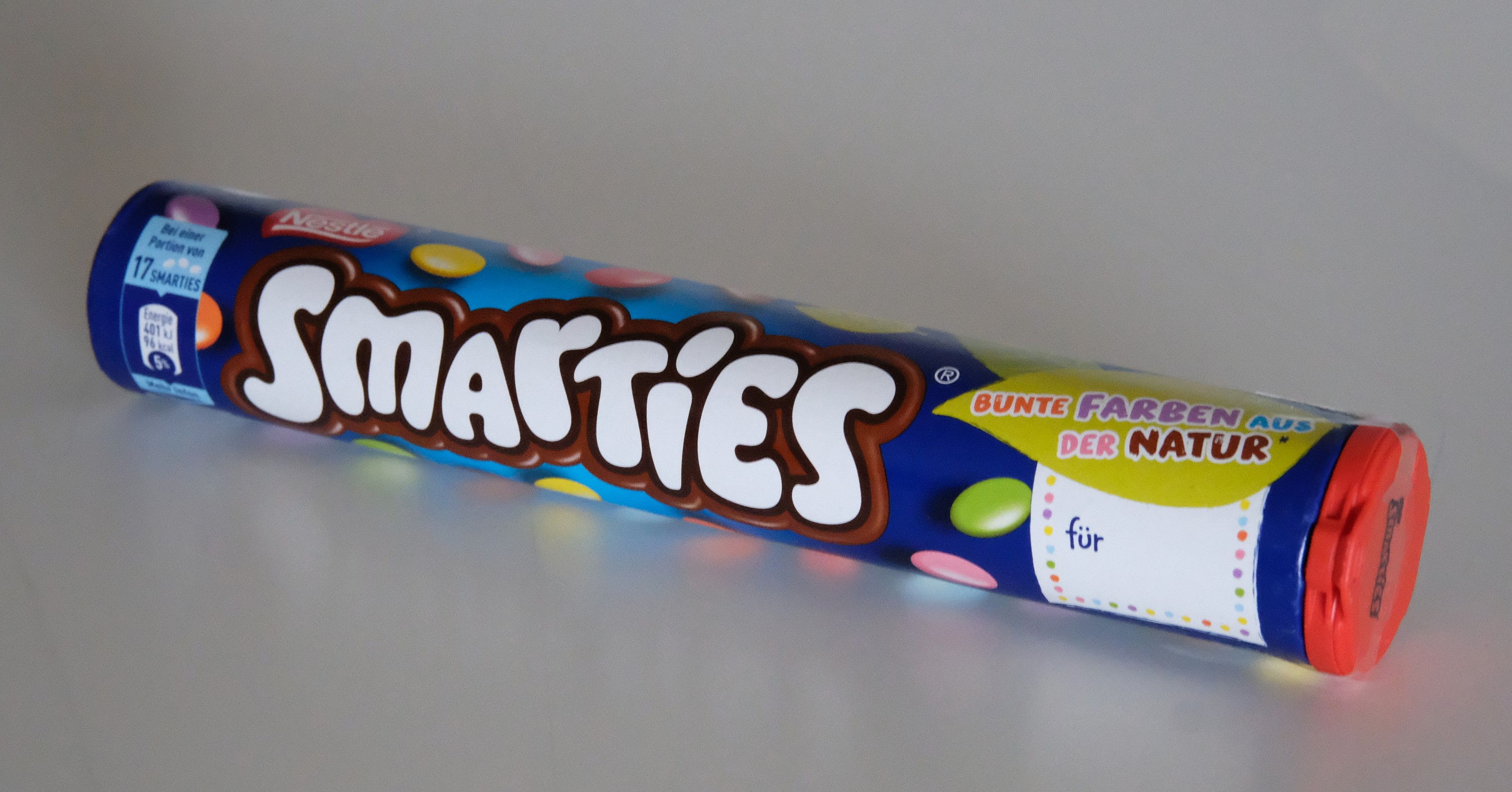
Smarties (130g)

In February 2005, the Smarties tube was replaced with a hexagonal design. The rationale behind changing the design was, according to Nestlé, to make the brand "fresh and appealing" to youngsters; the new packaging is also lighter and more compact, and the lid (which is now a hinged piece of cardboard) has a card clip which holds the lid shut when it is folded over. The new lid still features a letter like the old plastic lids, but it is in the form of a "what [letter] is a [thing]?" question, the answer for which can be read when the lid is open, next to the hole giving access to the rest of the tube.

Smarties are no longer manufactured in York; in October 2007, production was moved to Germany, where a third of them were already made. Outside Europe, Nestlé's largest production facility for Smarties is in Toronto, Canada, where Nestlé has been manufacturing its products since 1918. The factory located at 72 Sterling Road in the Junction Triangle was originally built for Cowan Cocoa and Chocolate in 1905.

In 1998, Nestlé obtained a trademark for a tubular Smarties package. It later sued Master Foods in Denmark, which was marketing M&M minis in a similar package. The Supreme Court of Denmark ruled that a basic geometrical shape could not be trademarked and ordered the trademark to be removed from the trademark register.

In 2021, the parent company Nestlé transferred the production of Lentilky, which had been produced in Czechia since 1907, to German Hamburg, and the ingredients are also being harmonized with the Smarties product.

== Colours and flavours ==
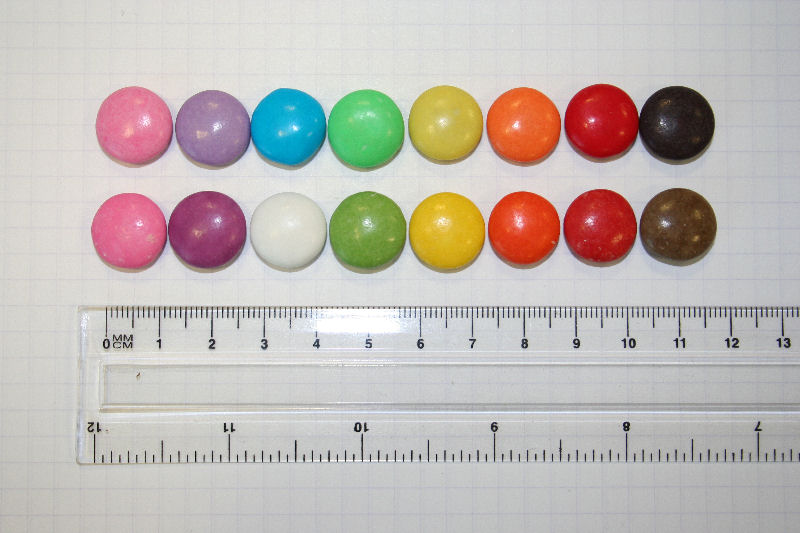
UK Nestlé Smarties, before (above) and immediately after (below) transition to natural colours. The blue Smartie was later reintroduced, using a natural blue dye.

Coloured Smarties were introduced in 1937. The initial colours were red, orange, yellow, green, mauve, pink, dark brown, and light brown. Until 1958, the dark-brown Smarties had dark chocolate centres and the light-brown ones were coffee-flavoured. The orange Smarties sold in the UK are orange flavoured. Otherwise, modern Smarties all have plain milk chocolate centres.

In 1988 the light-brown Smarties were replaced by blue ones, introduced as part of a campaign opposing the purchase of Rowntree Mackintosh Confectionery by Nestlé, along with 'I Support Blue Smarties' pin badges.

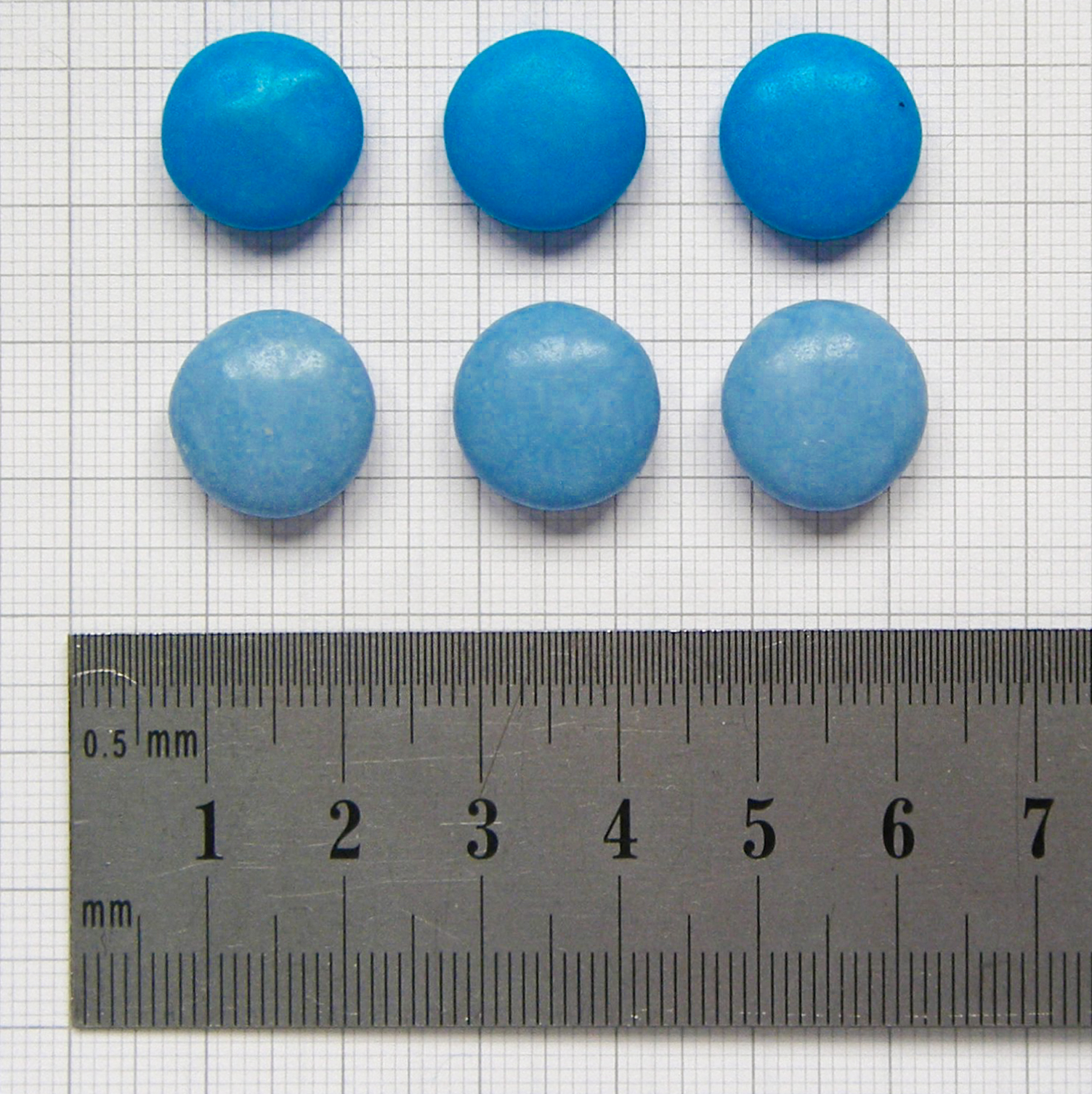
UK blue Smarties, old (above) and new (below)

In 2006, it was announced that Nestlé was removing all artificial colourings from Smarties in the United Kingdom. As a result of the change, the mauve Smarties were replaced with violet ones. Nestlé was initially unable to source a natural blue dye and so replaced blue Smarties with white ones. In February 2008, blue Smarties were reintroduced using natural blue dye derived from the cyanobacterium spirulina instead of the controversial brilliant blue FCF (FD&C Blue 1, E133). Artificial colouring was removed from Smarties on the Canadian market in March 2009. The new range included all the colours except blue. Blue Smarties were reintroduced in May 2010.

Red Smarties were previously dyed with cochineal, a derivative of the product made by extracting colour from female cochineal insects. A pigment extracted from red cabbage is now used in the United Kingdom, and from red beets in Canada.

A chart below shows the colours available at different times:

== See also ==
- Nestlé Smarties Book Prize
- Galaxy Minstrels
- Reese's Pieces
- Smarties: Meltdown
- Skittles
