= National Science & Mathematics Access to Retain Talent Grant =

The National Science and Mathematics Access to Retain Talent (SMART) Grant was a need based federal grant that was awarded to undergraduate students in their third and fourth year of undergraduate studies. The National SMART grant was introduced to help maintain the edge that United States has in the fields of Science and Technology. Only specific majors were eligible for the SMART grant, the complete list is given below.

== History ==
The National Science and Mathematics Access to Retain Talent (SMART) Grant was introduced by Senator Bill Frist, R-Tennessee and approved by the Senate on 21 December 2005 as part of the Higher Education Reconciliation Act. President Bush signed the bill into law on Feb 8, 2006. This program ended June 30, 2011.

== Application ==
Applying for the National SMART grant requires the student and the student's family to complete a Free Application For Federal Student Aid (FAFSA) form. Eligible students based on GPA, major and Pell Grant eligibility will be identified by the educational institute. The applicant does not need to file a separate application for being considered for a SMART grant.

== Eligibility ==
The student must be a U.S Citizen, must be enrolled in a qualifying four year degree program, must be in the third or fourth year of the program, must be eligible to receive a Pell Grant in the same year, must maintain a minimum GPA of 3.0

=== Qualifying Degree Programs ===
Eligible degree programs or majors for the SMART grant are Science (including Computer Science, Physical and Life Sciences), Engineering, Technology, Mathematics, Liberal Arts and Sciences, Critical foreign language studies and certain natural resource conservation and multidisciplinary programs.

In August 2006, The Chronicle of Higher Education noted that evolutionary biology had been removed from the list of qualifying majors. This caused concern among some scientists and educators, who feared that the omission was deliberate and politically motivated. The Department of Education has denied this, stating that the major was removed from the list inadvertently, and that it would correct the omission.

In September 2006, evolutionary biology, along with exercise physiology, were added to the list of eligible majors.

== Award Amount ==
The grant awards a maximum of $4,000 a year. The amount of the SMART Grant, when combined with a Pell Grant, may not exceed the student's cost of attendance. In addition, if the number of eligible students is large enough that payment of the full grant amounts would exceed the program appropriation in any fiscal year, then the amount of the grant to each eligible student may be ratably reduced.

According to the Binghamton University website, "The SMART Grant program is only funded through the 2010-11 academic year. The grant will not be available for the 2011-2012 year and beyond." The SMART Grant was dissolved in April 2011.
