= Smarties (tablet candy) =

Wafer candy sold in the United States and Canada

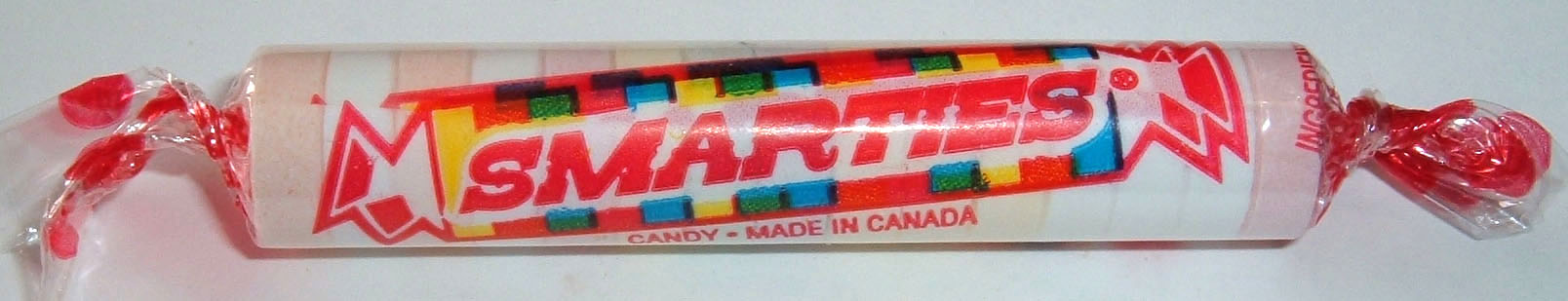

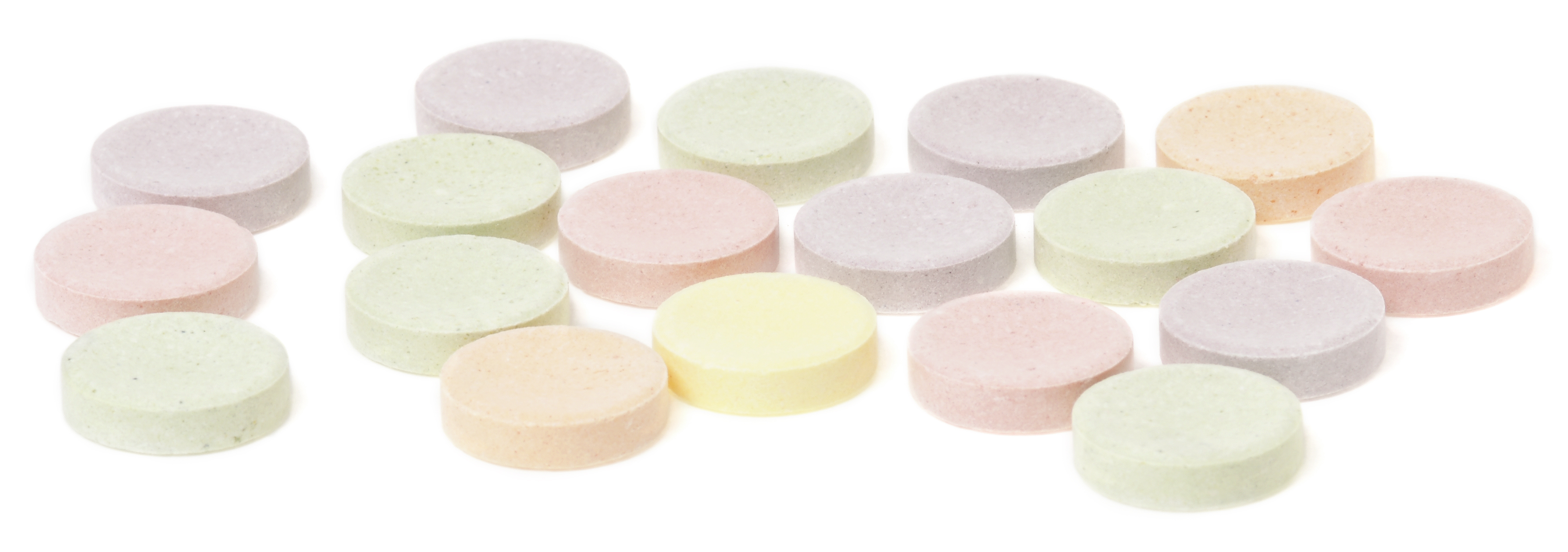
- Product type: Confectionery
- Current owner: Smarties Candy Company
- Country: United States
- Introduced: 1949; 77 years ago
- Website: www.smarties.com

In the United States, Smarties are a type of tablet candy produced by Smarties Candy Company, formerly known as Ce De Candy Inc., since 1949. Smarties are produced in factories in both Union Township, New Jersey, and Newmarket, Ontario. The candies distributed in Canada are marketed as Rockets, to avoid confusion with Smarties, a chocolate candy produced by Nestlé which holds the trademark in Canada. The New Jersey factory produces approximately 1 billion rolls of Smarties annually, and in total the company produces over 2.5 billion in a year.

Each candy is a biconcave disc, with a diameter of roughly 1 cm (0.39 in) and a height of roughly 4 mm (0.16 in). Larger ones have a diameter of 2.5 cm (0.98 in) and are about 6 mm (0.24 in) thick. Smarties come in combinations of colors within their wrapped rolls; these include white and pastel shades of yellow, pink, orange, purple, and green. Each color's flavor is different. They are usually packaged as a roll of 15 candies. Smarties candies are peanut-free, gluten-free, fat-free, and dairy-free. All Smarties candies are free of animal products and therefore vegan.

== History ==
After World War II, the Dee family bought pellet machines and repurposed them to make candy. This gave the candy its resemblance to tablet-style pills in shape and texture. When sugar prices spiked in the 1970s, Ce De Candy switched from sucrose to dextrose.

Edward Dee founded Ce De Candy in Bloomfield, New Jersey, in 1949. In 2011, the company was renamed Smarties Candy Company, after its most famous product.

In 2004, Ce De Candy Co., Inc., in conjunction with Rock The Vote, manufactured 500,000 special edition Smarties with "Rock the Vote" on the wrapper. A 3.5-ounce Theater box was released in 2009, with a retro look on the boxes. In August 2011, the company confirmed that Smarties are vegan.

Starting on October 2, 2022, Smarties launched National Smarties Day, hosting a year supply giveaway of candy and launching a TikTok challenge to celebrate Edward Dee’s birthday.

=== Snorting controversy ===
In January 2011, a middle school in Provo, Utah, reported that its students had started to crush the Smarties into a fine powder and inhale them, mimicking a form of drug consumption, following a YouTube trend. Health effects of this trend could be scarring of the nasal cavity, irritation, and a possible risk of allergic reaction. A similar trend also observed at the same time at the Portsmouth school was "smoking" the Smarties, taking in the dust orally and blowing it out, resembling cigarette smoke.

== Production ==
The Smarties Candy Company operates two factories, one in Union, New Jersey, and one in Newmarket, Ontario, Canada. The factories produce Smarties 24 hours a day, five days a week, amounting to over 70,000 pounds (around 32,000 kilograms) per day. After mixing the dry ingredients they are pressed into tablets and then stacked and rolled into a Smarties wrapper for packaging. Smarties Candy Company produces over 2 billion Smarties rolls every year.

=== Ingredients ===
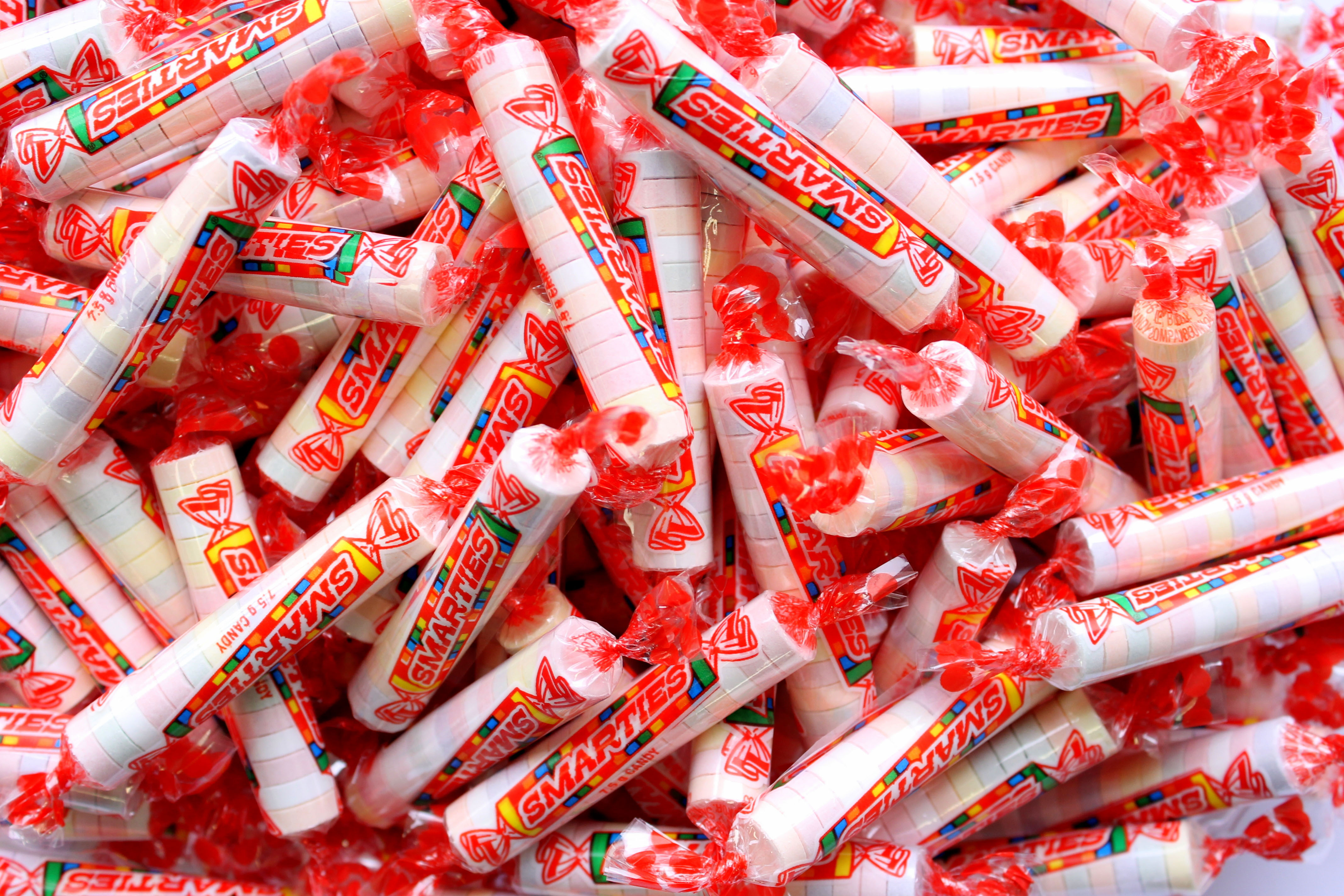
Smarties Rolls

The ingredients in Smarties candies are dextrose, citric acid, calcium stearate, natural and artificial flavors, and colors. There are 25 calories and 6.9 grams of sugar in a roll of Smarties.

=== Flavors ===
Each package contains an assortment of pastel colors in the following flavors:

- White: Orange cream
- Yellow: Pineapple
- Pink: Cherry
- Green: Strawberry
- Purple: Grape
- Orange: Orange

Smarties Candy Company also produces "X-treme Sour" and "Tropical" varieties of Smarties as well as "Lollies and Giant Lollies". In October 2015, the company launched Smarties 'n Creme, which are quarter-sized candy tablets with Smarties flavor on one side and creme flavor on the other.

== See also ==
- Necco Wafers
- Parma Violets
- SweeTarts
