= ISAT =

ISAT can stand for:

- International Subarachnoid Aneurysm Trial
- Illinois Standards Achievement Test
- Idaho Standards Achievement Test
- In Situ Adaptive Tabulation
- International Student Admissions Test
- International Schools Association of Thailand
- Internet Security Awareness Training
- Innovative Space-based Radar Antenna Technology
- Institut supérieur de l'automobile et des transports
- Iodine Satellite
- In Stars and Time
- Isat Buchanan, Jamaican politician

== See also ==
- I.Sat—Latin American cable channel
