= Bernard Foing =

French scientist at the European Space Agency

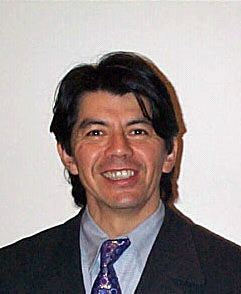
- Born: France
- Education: Ecole Normale Supérieure of Education & Technology
- Known for: Principal Project Scientist for SMART-1
- Spouse: Pascale Ehrenfreund

Bernard Foing (French pronunciation: [bɛʁnaʁ fwɛ̃]) was a French scientist at the European Space Agency (ESA), Executive Director of the International Lunar Exploration Working Group (ILEWG) and was Principal Project Scientist for SMART-1, the first European mission to the Moon. He is also a research professor at the VU Amsterdam and at Florida Tech.

== Biography ==
Born in France, Bernard Foing has a PhD in Astrophysics and Space Techniques. He worked 3 years in Chile as an astronomer for the European Southern Observatory (ESO), the French embassy, and as Professor of Astrophysics. A researcher at French National Centre for Scientific Research (CNRS) since 1986, Foing obtained the Habilitation for direction of research in 1990. At ESA since 1993, he is Senior Research Coordinator at the Research and Scientific Support Department. He was president of ILEWG in 1998-2000 and now is their Executive Director. Foing collaborates with his wife, Pascale Ehrenfreund of the German Aerospace Center, in some of his research.

== SMART-1 ==
Foing is known as the father of SMART-1. Serving as Principal Project Scientist from conception in 1996, SMART-1 was the first European mission to the Moon. SMART-1's goals were both technological and scientific. First in a series of "Small Missions for Advanced Research in Technology", SMART-1 was used to test new state-of-the art instruments such as a solar-electric primary propulsion system. SMART-1 also performed scientific observations of the Moon including determining the Moon's mineralogical composition and the presence and quantity of water in the craters at the Moon's south pole. Launched on September 27, 2003, SMART-1 entered lunar orbit in November 2004 and continued orbit until it was intentionally crashed into the lunar surface on September 3, 2006. Said Foing, "SMART-1 data are helping to choose future landing sites for robotic and possible manned missions, and its instruments are upgraded and being flown again on the next generation of lunar satellites."

== Mars Express ==
Foing is an organic chemist for Mars Express, a space exploration mission by the European Space Agency. Launched on June 2, 2004, Mars Express is the first planetary mission attempted by the agency. Foing is also co-investigator of the High Resolution Stereo Camera (HRSC) for the Mars Express orbiter. The HRSC is a high-resolution camera that can make full-color 3D images of Mars's surface. The camera can also zoom in for a closer look and may be helpful in identifying useful landing sites for future Mars missions.

== Bibliography ==
Foing has published over 400 articles, including 160 refereed papers, in lunar and planetary science and exploration, solar/stellar physics and astrobiology. He edited 16 books and organized over 50 international conferences and symposia.
