= Small Missions for Advanced Research in Technology =

Small Missions for Advanced Research in Technology (SMART) was a European Space Agency programme for building technology demonstrator space probes and testing them in outer space as space missions.

SMART missions include:

- SMART-1, a mission to test electric propulsion rockets, by using Hall-effect thrusters; and also used as an outer space probe, and lunar probe.
- SMART-2 LISA Pathfinder, a mission to test the feasibility of formation flying multiple satellites for precision laser measurement, for use as a gravity wave detector.
- SMART-3, an unfulfilled 2006 design deadline.
- SMART-4, an unfulfilled 2009 design deadline.
