= SMART-1 =

European Space Agency satellite that orbited the Moon

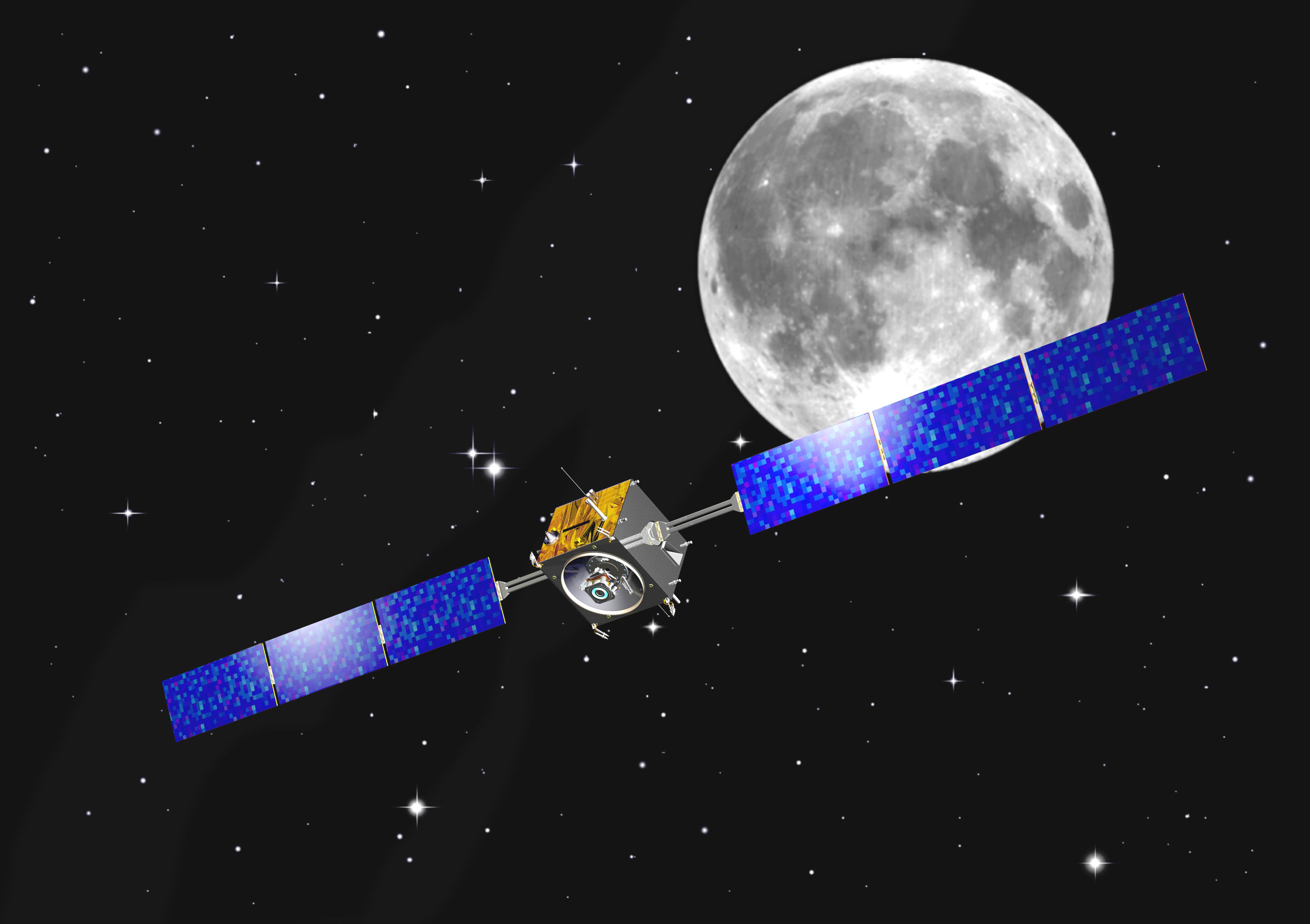
- Artist's impression of SMART-1
- Mission type: Technology; Lunar orbiter
- Operator: ESA
- COSPAR ID: 2003-043C
- SATCAT no.: 27949
- Website: SMART-1
- Mission duration: 2 years, 11 months, 6 days, 6 hours, 27 minutes, 36 seconds

Spacecraft properties
- Manufacturer: Swedish Space Corporation
- Launch mass: 367 kilograms (809 lb)
- Dry mass: 287 kilograms (633 lb)

Start of mission
- Launch date: 27 September 2003, 23:14:46 UTC
- Rocket: Ariane 5G
- Launch site: Kourou ELA-3
- Contractor: Arianespace

End of mission
- Decay date: 3 September 2006, 05:42:22 UTC

Orbital parameters
- Reference system: Selenocentric
- Eccentricity: 0.352054
- Periselene altitude: 2,205 kilometres (1,370 mi)
- Aposelene altitude: 4,600 kilometres (2,900 mi)
- Inclination: 90.26 degrees
- Period: 4.95 hours
- Epoch: 18 July 2005, 11:14:28 UTC

Lunar orbiter
- Orbital insertion: 15 November 2004
- Impact site: 34.262°S 46.193°W
Instruments
- AMIE: Advanced Moon micro-Imager Experiment
- D-CIXS: Demonstration of a Compact X-ray Spectrometer
- EPDP: Electric Propulsion Diagnostic Package
- KATE: Ka band TT&C Experiment
- SIR: Smart-1 Infrared Spectrometer
- SPEDE: Spacecraft Potential, Electron and Dust Experiment
- XSM: X-ray Solar Monitor
- Contemporary ESA insignia (2000s)

SMART-1 was a European Space Agency satellite that orbited the Moon. It was launched on 27 September 2003 at 23:14 UTC from the Guiana Space Centre in Kourou, French Guiana. "SMART-1" stands for Small Missions for Advanced Research in Technology-1, part of the Small Missions for Advanced Research in Technology programme. On 3 September 2006 (05:42 UTC), SMART-1 was deliberately crashed into the Moon's surface, ending its mission.

== Spacecraft design ==
SMART-1 was about one meter across (3.3 ft), and lightweight in comparison to other probes. Its launch mass was 367 kg or 809 pounds, of which 287 kg (633 lb) was non-propellant.

It was propelled by a solar-powered Hall-effect thruster (Snecma PPS-1350-G) using 82 kg of xenon gas contained in a 50 litres tank at a pressure of 150 bar at launch. The ion engine thruster used an electrostatic field to ionize the xenon and accelerate the ions achieving a specific impulse of 16.1 kN·s/kg (1,640 seconds), more than three times the maximum for chemical rockets. One kg of propellant (1/350 to 1/300 of the total mass of the spacecraft) produced a delta-v of about 45 m/s. The electric propulsion subsystem weighted 29 kg with a peak power consumption of 1,200 watts. SMART-1 was the first in the program of ESA's Small Missions for Advanced Research and Technology.

The solar arrays made capable of 1850 W at the beginning of the mission, were able to provide the maximum set of 1,190 W to the thruster, giving a nominal thrust of 68 mN, hence an acceleration of 0.2 mm/s^{2} or 0.7 m/s per hour (i.e., just under 0.00002 g of acceleration). As with all ion-engine powered craft, orbital maneuvers were not carried out in short bursts but very gradually. The particular trajectory taken by SMART-1 to the Moon required thrusting for about one third to one half of every orbit. When spiraling away from the Earth thrusting was done on the perigee part of the orbit. At the end of the mission, the thruster had demonstrated the following capability:

- Thruster operating time: 5000 h
- Xenon throughput: 82 kg
- Total Impulse: 1.2 MN-s
- Total ΔV: 3.9 km/s

As part of the European Space Agency's strategy to build very inexpensive and relatively small spaceships, the total cost of SMART-1 was a relatively small 110 million euros (about 170 million U.S. dollars). SMART-1 was designed and developed by the Swedish Space Corporation on behalf of ESA. Assembly of the spacecraft was carried out by Saab Space in Linköping. Tests of the spacecraft were directed by Swedish Space Corporation and executed by Saab Space. The project manager at ESA was Giuseppe Racca until the spacecraft achieved the moon operational orbit. He was then replaced by Gerhard Schwehm for the Science phase. The project manager at the Swedish Space Corporation was Peter Rathsman. The Principal Project Scientist was Bernard Foing. The Ground Segment Manager during the preparation phase was Mike McKay and the Spacecraft Operations manager was Octavio Camino.

== Instruments ==
=== AMIE ===
The Advanced Moon micro-Imager Experiment was a miniature colour camera for lunar imaging. The CCD camera with three filters of 750, 900 and 950 nm was able to take images with an average pixel resolution of 80 m (about 260 ft). The camera weighed 2.1 kg (about 4.5 lb) and had a power consumption of 9 watts.

=== D-CIXS ===
The Demonstration of a Compact X-ray Spectrometer was an X-ray telescope for the identification of chemical elements on the lunar surface. It detected the X-ray fluorescence (XRF) of crystal compounds created through the interaction of the electron shell with the solar wind particles to measure the abundance of the three main components: magnesium, silicon and aluminium. The detection of iron, calcium and titanium depended on the solar activity. The detection range for X-rays was 0.5 to 10 keV. The spectrometer and XSM (described below) together weighed 5.2 kg and had a power consumption of 18 watts.

=== XSM ===
The X-ray solar monitor studied the solar variability to complement D-CIXS measurements.

=== SIR ===
The Smart-1 Infrared Spectrometer was an infrared spectrometer for the identification of mineral spectra of olivine and pyroxene. It detected wavelengths from 0.93 to 2.4 μm with 256 channels. The package weighed 2.3 kg and had a power consumption of 4.1 watts.

=== EPDP ===
The Electric Propulsion Diagnostic Package was to acquire data on the new propulsion system on SMART-1. The package weighed 0.8 kg and had a power consumption of 1.8 watts.

=== SPEDE ===
The Spacecraft Potential, Electron and Dust Experiment. The experiment weighed 0.8 kg and had a power consumption of 1.8 watts. Its function was to measure the properties and density of the plasma around the spacecraft, either as a Langmuir probe or as an electric field probe. SPEDE observed the emission of the spacecraft's ion engine and the "wake" the Moon leaves to the solar wind. Unlike most other instruments that have to be shut down to prevent damage, SPEDE could keep measuring inside radiation belts and in solar storms, such as the Halloween 2003 solar storms. It was built by Finnish Meteorological Institute and its name was intentionally chosen so that its acronym is the same as the nickname of Spede Pasanen, a famous Finnish movie actor, movie producer, and inventor. The algorithms developed for SPEDE were later used in the ESA lander Philae.

=== KATE ===
K_{a} band TT&C (telemetry, tracking and control) Experiment. The experiment weighed 6.2 kg and had a power consumption of 26 watts. The Ka-band transponder was designed as precursor for BepiColombo to perform radio science investigations and to monitor the dynamical performance of the electric propulsion system.

== Flight ==
SMART-1 was launched 27 September 2003 together with Insat 3E and eBird 1, by an Ariane 5 rocket from the Guiana Space Centre in French Guiana. After 42 minutes it was released into a geostationary transfer orbit of 7,035 × 42,223 km. From there it used its Solar Electric Primary Propulsion (SEPP) to gradually spiral out during thirteen months.

The orbit can be seen up to 26 October 2004 at spaceref.com, when the orbit was 179,718 × 305,214 km. On that date, after the 289th engine pulse, the SEPP had accumulated a total on-time of nearly 3,648 hours out of a total flight time of 8,000 hours, hence a little less than half of its total mission. It consumed about 58.8 kg of xenon and produced a delta-v of 2,737 m/s (46.5 m/s per kg xenon, 0.75 m/s per hour on-time). It was powered on again on 15 November for a planned burn of 4.5 days to enter fully into lunar orbit. It took until February 2005 using the electric thruster to decelerate into the final orbit 300–3,000 km above the Moon's surface. The end of mission performance demonstrated by the propulsion system is stated above.

Summary of osculating geocentric orbital elements
Epoch (UTC)	Perigee (km)	Apogee (km)	Eccentricity	Inclination (deg) (to Earth equator)	Period (h)
27 September 2003	~7,035	~42,223	~0.714	~6.9	~10.6833
26 October 2003, 21:20:00.0	8,687.994	44,178.401	0.671323	6.914596	11.880450
19 November 2003, 04:29:48.4	10,843.910	46,582.165	0.622335	6.861354	13.450152
19 December 2003, 06:41:47.6	13,390.351	49,369.049	0.573280	6.825455	15.366738
29 December 2003, 05:21:47.8	17,235.509	54,102.642	0.516794	6.847919	18.622855
19 February 2004, 22:46:08.6	20,690.564	65,869.222	0.521936	6.906311	24.890737
19 March 2004, 00:40:52.7	20,683.545	66,915.919	0.527770	6.979793	25.340528
25 August 2004, 00:00:00	37,791.261	240,824.363	0.728721	6.939815	143.738051
19 October 2004, 21:30:45.9	69,959.278	292,632.424	0.614115	12.477919	213.397970
24 October 2004, 06:12:40.9	179,717.894	305,214.126	0.258791	20.591807	330.053834

After its last perigee on 2 November, on 11 November 2004 it passed through the Earth-Moon L_{1} Lagrangian Point and into the area dominated by the Moon's gravitational influence, and at 1748 UT on 15 November passed the first periselene of its lunar orbit. The osculating orbit on that date was 6,704 × 53,208 km, with an orbital period of 129 hours, although the actual orbit was accomplished in only 89 hours. This illustrates the significant impact that the engine burns have on the orbit and marks the meaning of the osculating orbit, which is the orbit that would be travelled by the spacecraft if at that instant all perturbations, including thrust, would cease.

Summary of osculating selenocentric orbital elements
Epoch (UTC)	Periselene (km)	Aposelene (km)	Eccentricity	Inclination (deg) (to Moon equator)	Period (h)
15 November 2004, 17:47:12.1	6,700.720	53,215.151	0.776329	81.085	129.247777
4 December 2004 10:37:47.3	5,454.925	20,713.095	0.583085	83.035	37.304959
9 January 2005, 15:24:55.0	2,751.511	6,941.359	0.432261	87.892	8.409861
28 February 2005, 05:18:39.9	2,208.659	4,618.220	0.352952	90.063603	4.970998
25 April 2005, 08:19:05.4	2,283.738	4,523.111	0.328988	90.141407	4.949137
16 May 2005, 09:08:52.9	2,291.250	4,515.857	0.326807	89.734929	4.949919
20 June 2005, 10:21:37.1	2,256.090	4,549.196	0.336960	90.232619	4.947432
18 July 2005, 11:14:28.0	2,204.645	4,600.376	0.352054	90.263741	4.947143

ESA announced on 15 February 2005 an extension of the mission of SMART-1 by one year until August 2006. This date was later shifted to 3 September 2006 to enable further scientific observations from Earth.

=== Lunar impact ===
SMART-1 impacted the Moon's surface, as planned, on 3 September 2006 at 05:42:22 UTC, ending its mission. Moving at approximately 2,000 m/s (4,500 mph), SMART-1 created an impact visible with ground telescopes from Earth. It is hoped that not only will this provide some data simulating a meteor impact, but also that it might expose materials in the ground, like water ice, to spectroscopic analysis.

ESA originally estimated that impact occurred at 34.4°S 46.2°W. In 2017, the impact site was identified from Lunar Reconnaissance Orbiter data at 34.262°S 46.193°W. At the time of impact, the Moon was visible in North and South America, and places in the Pacific Ocean, but not Europe, Africa, or western Asia.

This project has generated data and know-how that will be used for other missions, such as the ESA's BepiColombo mission to Mercury.

Animation of SMART-1

Around the Earth

Around the Moon

SMART-1 · Earth · Moon

== Important events and discoveries ==
- 27 September 2003: SMART-1 launched from the European Spaceport in Kourou by an Ariane 5 launcher.
- 17 June 2004: SMART-1 took a test image of Earth with the camera that would later be used for Moon closeup pictures. It shows parts of Europe and Africa. It was taken on 21 May with the AMIE camera.
- 2 November 2004: Last perigee of Earth orbit.
- 15 November 2004: First perilune of lunar orbit.
- 15 January 2005: Calcium detected in Mare Crisium.
- 26 January 2005: First close up pictures of the lunar surface sent back.
- 27 February 2005: Reached final orbit around the Moon with an orbital period of about five hours.
- 15 April 2005: The search for PELs begins.
- 3 September 2006: Mission ends with a planned crash into the Moon during orbit number 2,890.

== Smart-1 Ground Segment and Operations ==
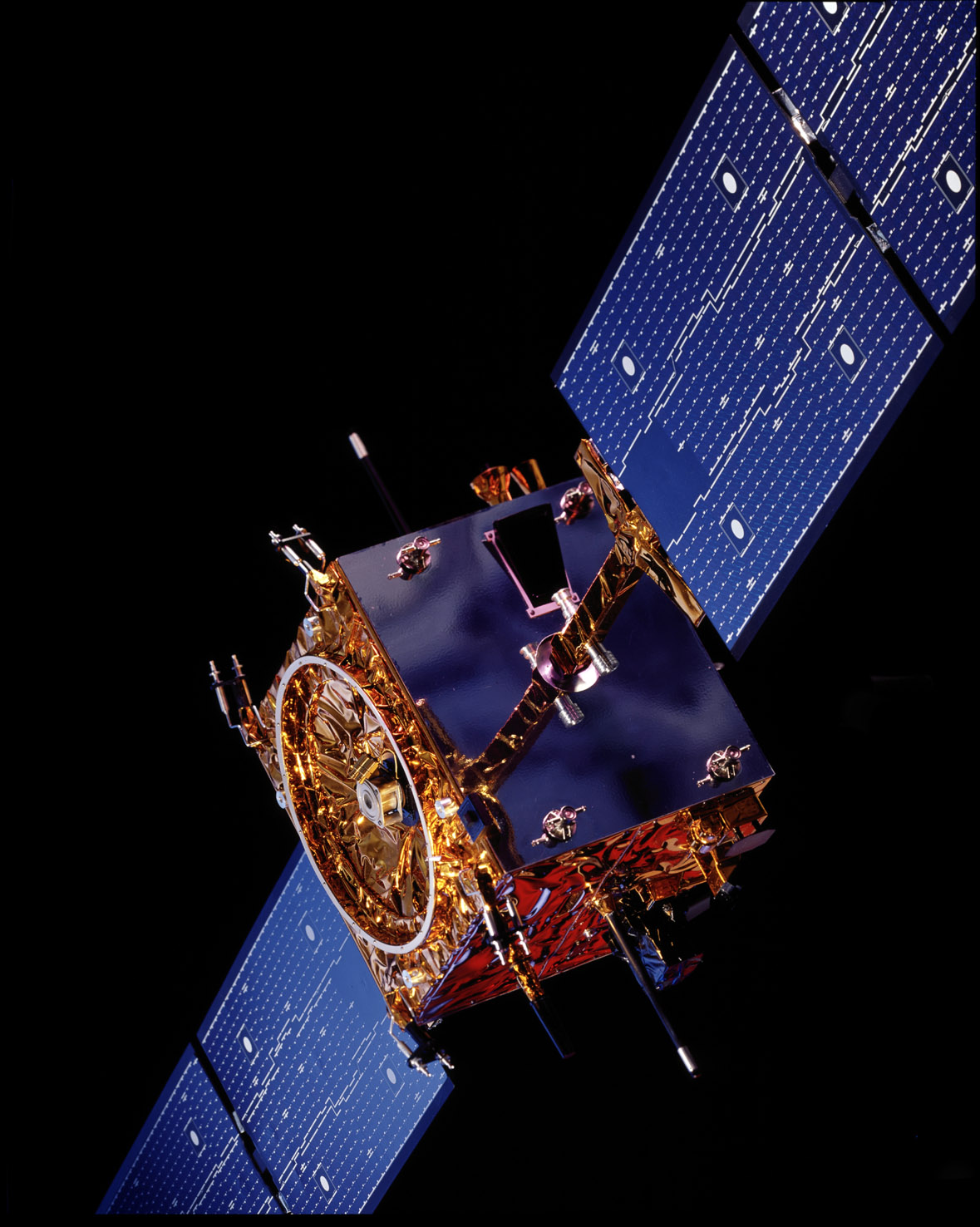
Smart-1 spacecraft

Smart-1 operations were conducted from the ESA European Space Operations Center ESOC in Darmstadt Germany led by the Spacecraft Operations Manager Octavio Camino.

The ground segment of Smart-1 was a good example of infrastructure reuse at ESA: Flight Dynamics infrastructure and Data distribution System (DDS) from Rosetta, Mars Express and Venus Express. The generic mission control system software SCOS 2000, and a set of generic interface elements use at ESA for the operations of their missions.

The use of CCSDS TLM and TC standards permitted a cost effective tailoring of seven different terminals of the ESA Tracking network (ESTRACK) plus Weilheim in Germany (DLR).

The components that were developed specifically for Smart-1 were: the simulator; a mix of hardware and software derived from the Electrical Ground Support Equipment EGSE equipment, the Mission Planning System and the Automation System developed from MOIS (this last based on a prototype implemented for Envisat) and a suite of engineering tools called MUST. This last permitted the Smart-1 engineers to do anomaly investigation through internet, pioneering at ESA monitoring of spacecraft TLM using mobile phones and PDAs and receiving spacecraft alarms via SMS. The Mission Control Team was composed of seven engineers in the Flight Control Team (FCT), a variable group between 2–5 Flight Dynamics engineers and 1–2 Data Systems engineers. Unlike most ESA missions, there were no Spacecraft Controllers (SPACONs), and all operations and mission-planning activities were done by the FCT. This concept originated overtime and night shifts during the first months of the mission but worked well during the cruise and the Moon phases. The major concern during the first three months of the mission was to leave the radiation belts as soon as possible in order to minimize the degradation of the solar arrays and the star tracker CCDs.

The first and most critical problem came after the first revolution when a failure in the onboard Error Detection and Correction (EDAC) algorithm triggered an autonomous switch to the redundant computer in every orbit causing several reboots, finding the spacecraft in SAFE mode after every pericenter passage. The analysis of the spacecraft telemetry pointed directly to a radiation-triggered problem with the EDAC interrupt routine.

Other anomalies during this period were a combination of environmental problems: high radiation doses, especially in the star trackers and onboard software anomalies: the Reed Solomon encoding became corrupt after switching data rates and had to be disabled. It was overcome by procedures and changes on ground operations approach. The star trackers were also subject of frequent hiccups during the earth escape and caused some of the Electric Propulsion (EP) interruptions. They were all resolved with several software patches.

The EP showed sensitivity to radiation inducing shutdowns. This phenomenon identified as the Opto-coupler Single Event Transient (OSET), initially seen in LEOP during the first firing using cathode B, was characterized by a rapid drop in Anode Current triggering the alarm 'Flame Out' bit causing the shutdown of the EP. The problem was identified to be radiation induced Opto-coupler sensitivity. The recovery of such events was to restart the thruster. This was manually done during several months until an On Board Software Patch (OBSW) was developed to detect it and initiate an autonomous thruster restart. Its impact was limited to the orbit prediction calculation used for the Ground Stations to track the spacecraft and the subsequent orbit corrections.

The different kind of anomalies and the frequent interruptions in the thrust of the Electric Propulsion led to an increase of the ground stations support and overtime of the flight operations team who had to react quickly. Their recovery was sometimes time-consuming, especially when the spacecraft was found in SAFE mode. Overall, they impeded to run the operations as originally planned having one 8 hours pass every 4 days.

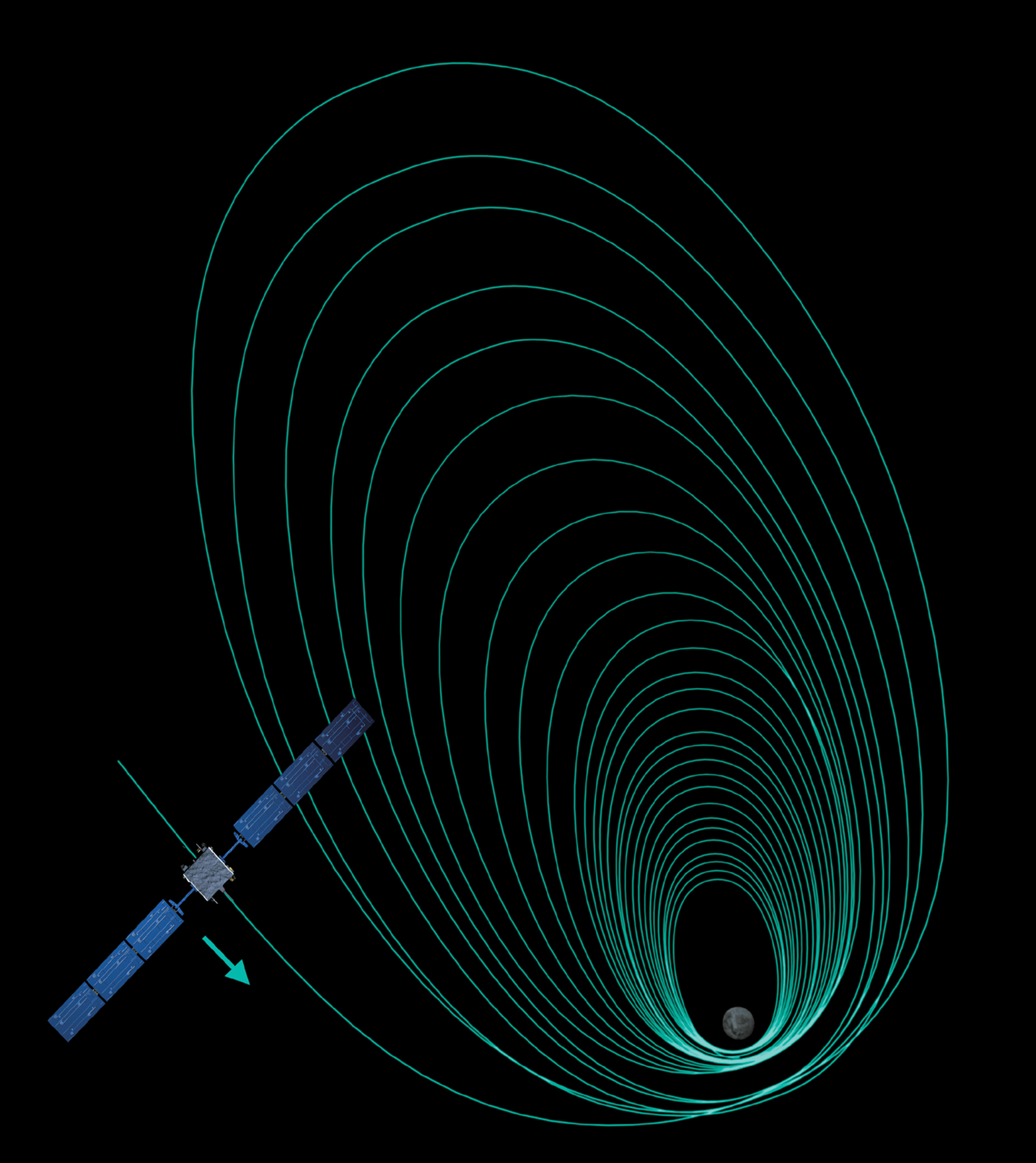
Smart-1 Moon orbit descend

The mission negotiated the use the ESTRACK network spare capacity. This concept permitted about eight times additional network coverage at no extra cost but originated unexpected overheads and conflicts. It ultimately permitted additional contacts with the spacecraft during the early stage of the mission and an important increase of science during the Moon phase. This phase required a major reconfiguration of the on-board stores and its operation. This change designed by the flight control team at ESOC and implemented by the Swedish Space Corporation in a short time required to re-write part of the Flight Control Procedures FOP for the operations at the Moon.

The Operations during the Moon phase become highly automated: the flight dynamics pointing was "menu driven" allowing more than 98% of commanding being generated by the Mission Planning System MPS. The extension of the MPS system with the so-called MOIS Executor, became the Smart-1 automation system. It permitted to operate 70% of the passes unmanned towards the end of the mission and allowed the validation of the first operational "spacecraft automation system" at ESA.

The mission achieved all its objectives: getting out of the radiation belts influence 3 months after launch, spiraling out during 11 months and being captured by the Moon using resonances, the commissioning and operations of all instruments during the cruise phase and the optimization of the navigation and operational procedures required for Electric Propulsion operation. The efficient operations of the Electric Propulsion at the Moon allowed the reduction of the orbital radius benefiting the scientific operations and extending this mission by one extra year.

A detailed chronology of the operations events is provided in ref.

== Smart-1 Mission Phases ==
- Launch and Early Orbit Phase: Launch on 27 September 2003, initial orbit 7,029 x 42263 km.
- Van Allen Belt Escape: Continuous thrust strategy to raise the perigee radius. Escape phase completed by 22 December 2003, orbit 20000 x 63427 km.
- Earth Escape Cruise: Thrust around perigee only to raise the apogee radius.
- Moon resonances and Capture: Trajectory assists by means of Moon resonances. Moon capture on 15 November 2004 at 310,000 km from the Earth and 90,000 km from the Moon.
- Lunar Descent: Thrust used to lower the orbit, operational orbit 2,200 x 4,600 km.
- Lunar Science: Until the end of lifetime in September 2006, interrupted only by a one-month re-boost phase in September 2005 to optimize the lunar orbit.
- Orbit re-boost: Phase in June/July 2006 using the attitude thrusters to adjust the impact date and time.
- Moon Impact: Operations from July 2006 until the impact on 3 September 2006.

The full mission phases from the operations perspective is documented in including the performance of the different subsystems.

== See also ==
- List of artificial objects on the Moon
