= LISA Pathfinder =

2015 European Space Agency spacecraft

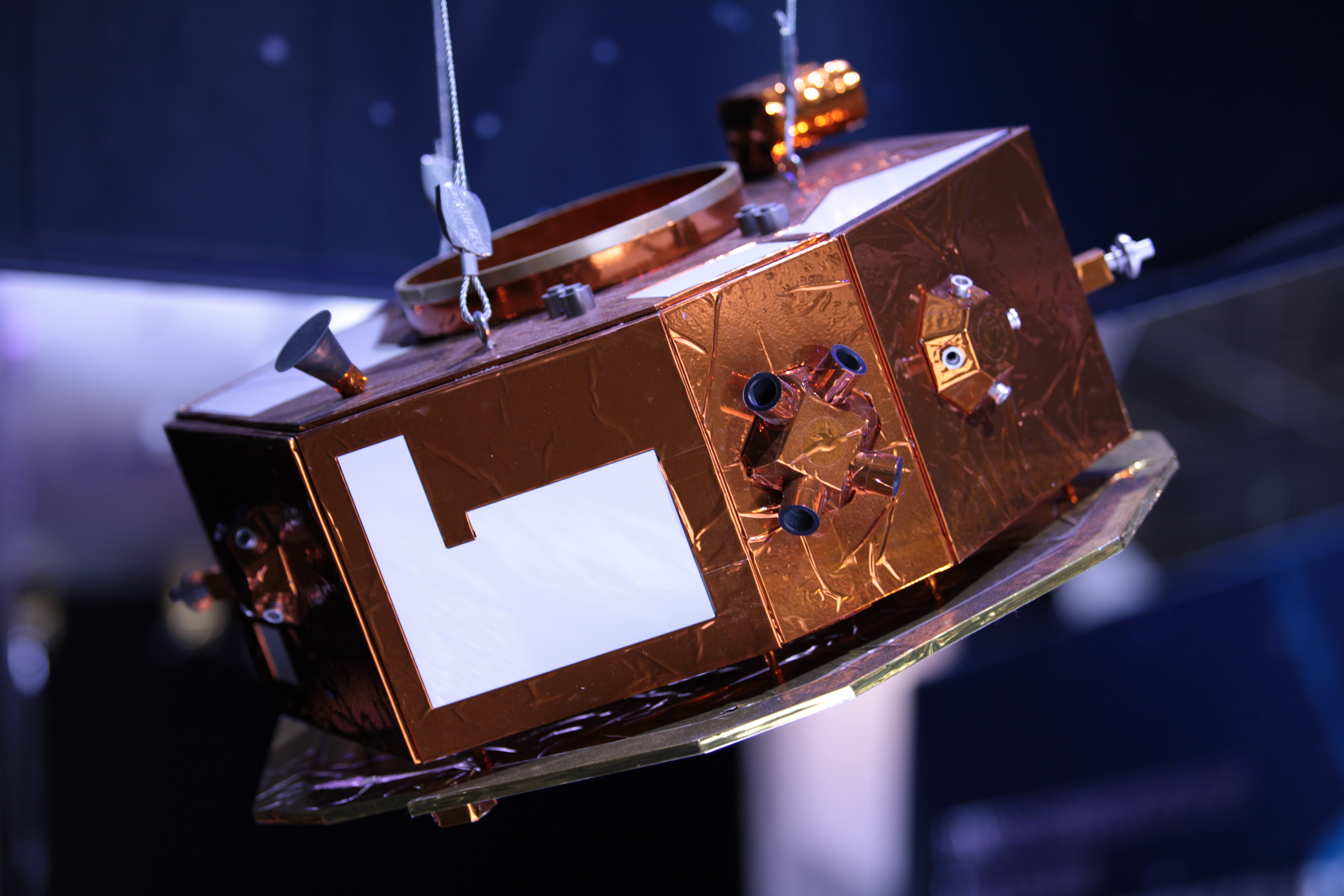
- Model of the LISA Pathfinder spacecraft
- Mission type: High-precision metrology, Technology demonstrator for gravitational-wave observation
- Operator: ESA
- COSPAR ID: 2015-070A
- SATCAT no.: 41043
- Mission duration: 576 days

Spacecraft properties
- Manufacturer: Airbus Defence and Space
- Launch mass: 1,910 kg (4,210 lb)
- BOL mass: 480 kg (1,060 lb)
- Dry mass: 810 kg (1,790 lb)
- Payload mass: 125 kg (276 lb)
- Dimensions: 2.9 m × 2.1 m (9.5 ft × 6.9 ft)

Start of mission
- Launch date: 3 December 2015, 04:04:00 UTC
- Rocket: Vega (VV06)
- Launch site: Kourou ELV
- Contractor: Arianespace

End of mission
- Disposal: Decommissioned
- Deactivated: 30 June 2017

Orbital parameters
- Reference system: Sun–Earth L_{1}
- Regime: Lissajous orbit
- Periapsis altitude: 500,000 km (310,000 mi)
- Apoapsis altitude: 800,000 km (500,000 mi)
- Inclination: 60 degrees
- Epoch: Planned

Transponders
- Band: X band
- Bandwidth: 7 kbit/s

Instruments
- ~36.7 cm Laser interferometer
- Contemporary ESA insignia (2010s) Horizon 2000 Plus (Science Programme)

LISA Pathfinder (LPF) was a space mission by the European Space Agency (ESA). It was launched on 3 December 2015 on a Vega rocket, and operated until July 2017. The mission tested key technologies needed for the Laser Interferometer Space Antenna (LISA), an ESA gravitational wave observatory planned to be launched in 2035. Formerly, the mission was known as Small Missions for Advanced Research in Technology-2 (SMART-2) of the Small Missions for Advanced Research in Technology ESA scientific programme. The LISA Pathfinder scientific phase started on 1 March 2016 and lasted almost sixteen months. In June 2016, ESA announced that LISA Pathfinder demonstrated that the LISA mission is feasible, paving the way for the official adoption of the LISA mission.

The mission cost was €490 million. It involved research institutes and space companies from many European countries, as well as the American National Aeronautics and Space Administration (NASA).

== Mission ==
LISA Pathfinder was a proof-of-concept mission, to prove that the two masses (known as test masses) can fly through space, untouched but shielded by the spacecraft, and maintain their relative positions to the precision needed to realize a full gravitational wave observatory. The primary objectives were to minimize the external forces acting on the test masses, guaranteeing small deviations from geodesic motion, and to measure their relative displacement with high precision. Much of the experimentation in gravitational physics requires measuring the relative acceleration between free-falling, geodesic reference test particles.

LISA Pathfinder hosted the first sub-picometer laser interferometer ever flown in space, capable of tracking the relative displacement of the two test masses, situated about 38 cm apart in a single spacecraft. For the gravitational wave observatory LISA, each of three separate spacecraft will host two test masses, 2.5 million kilometers apart. The science of LISA Pathfinder consisted of measuring and creating an experimentally-anchored physical model for all the spurious effects – including stray forces and optical measurement limits – that limit the ability to create, and measure, the perfect constellation of free-falling test particles that would be ideal for the LISA follow-up mission.

LISA will have its test mass pairs free falling along the spacecraft-to-spacecraft axes, with micro-Newton thrusters controlling the spacecraft motion to follow the test masses. In LISA Pathfinder, however, the complete free fall was not possible, as the two test masses were enclosed in the same spacecraft. Hence, the spacecraft could follow only one of the two masses in its free fall, and was forced to apply feedback forces to the second test mass. This way, the spacecraft acted as an active shield to external noisy forces, especially the solar radiation pressure, whose magnitude would prevent the mission to reach its requirements. The main LISA Pathfinder science measurement was therefore the out-of-loop differential acceleration between the two test masses.

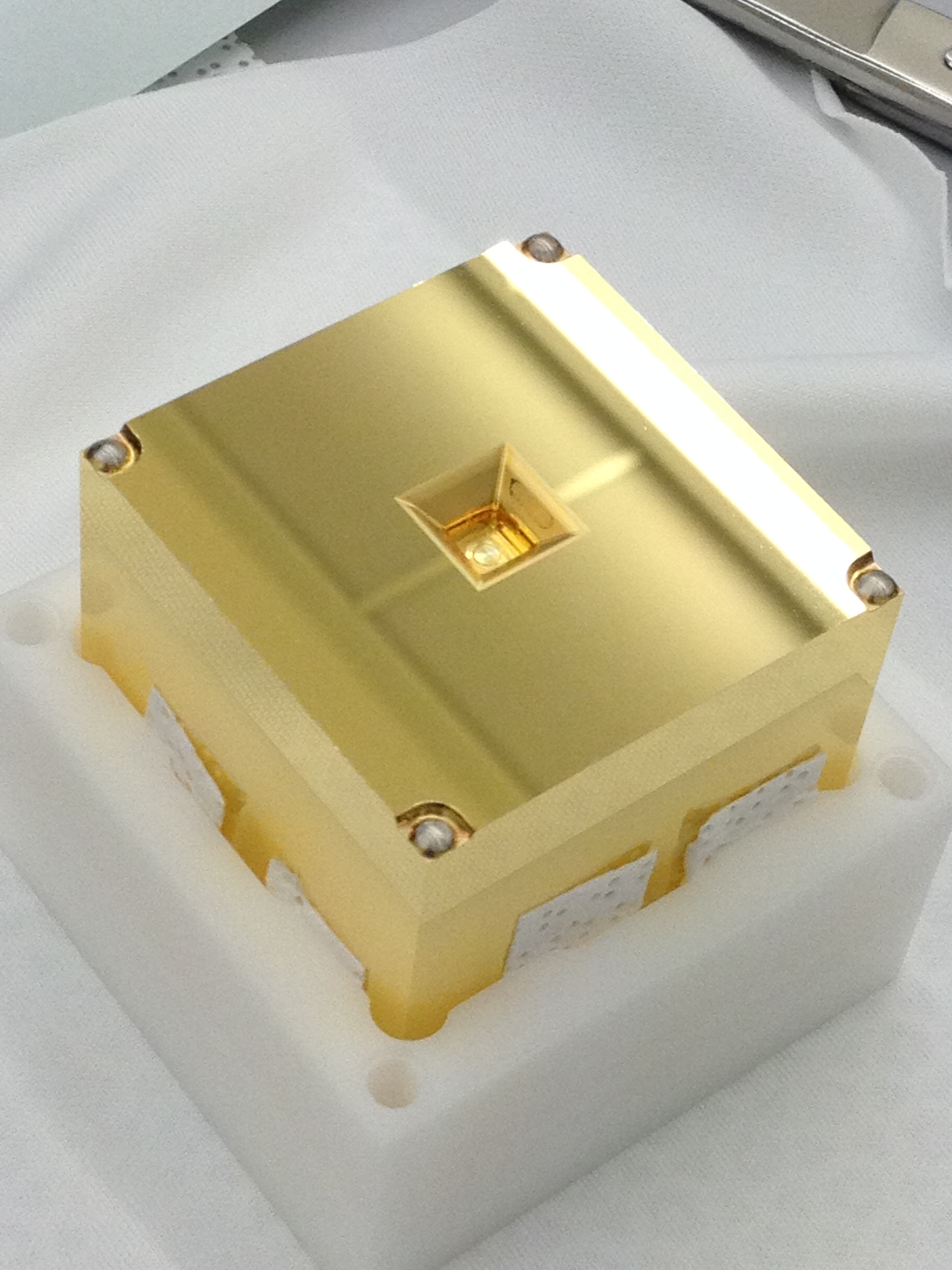
One of the two gold-platinum test masses, used as gravitational references and laser end-mirrors on LISA Pathfinder.

== Spacecraft design ==
LISA Pathfinder was assembled by Airbus Defence and Space in Stevenage (UK), under contract to the European Space Agency. It carried a European "LISA Technology Package" comprising inertial sensors, interferometer and associated instrumentation as well as two drag-free control systems: a European one using cold gas micro-thrusters (similar to those used on Gaia), and a US-built "Disturbance Reduction System" using the European sensors and an electric propulsion system that uses ionised droplets of a colloid accelerated in an electric field. The colloid thruster (or "electrospray thruster") system was built by Busek and delivered to JPL for integration with the spacecraft.

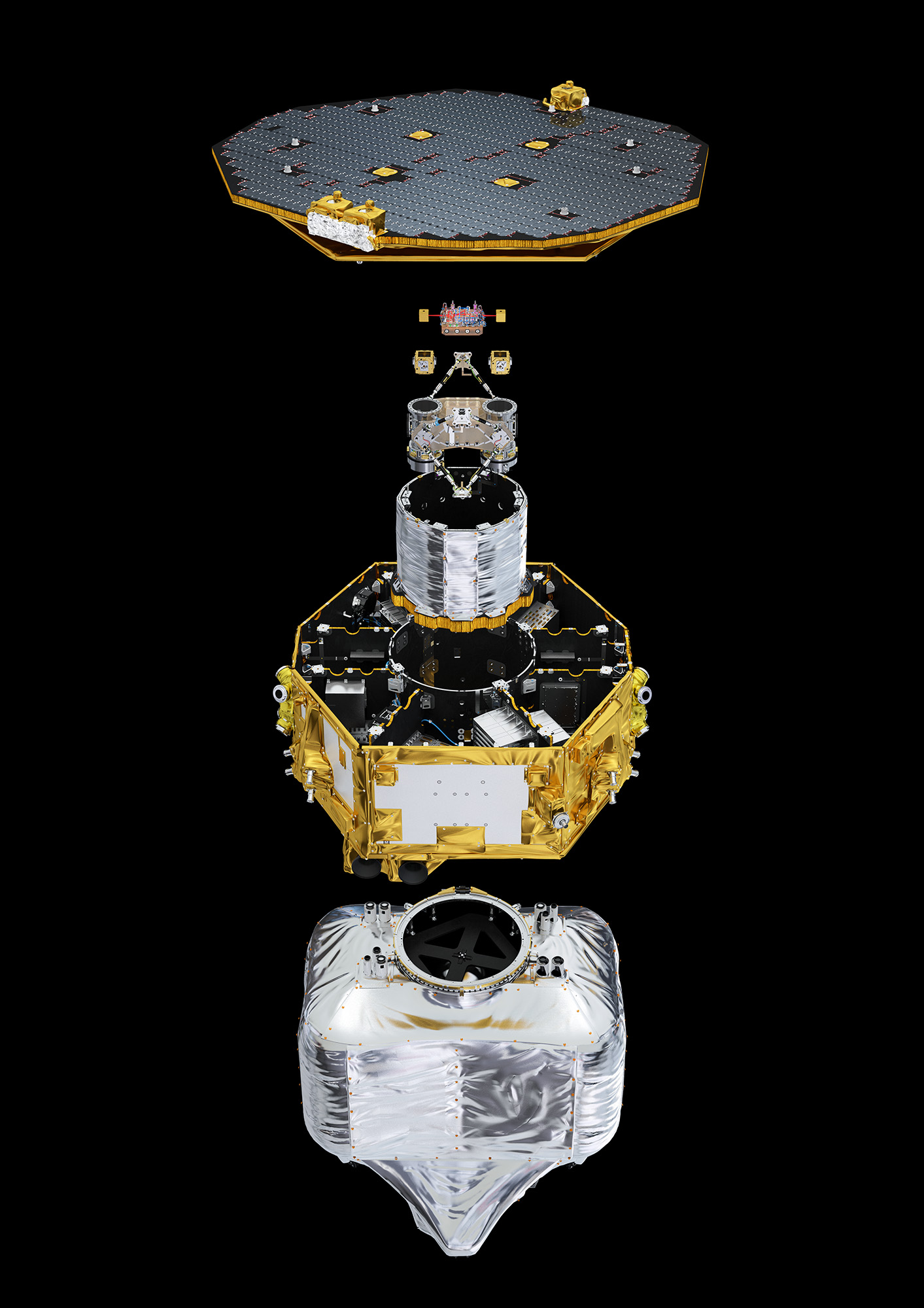
LISA Pathfinder exploded view

=== Instrumentation ===
The LISA Technology Package (LTP) was integrated by Airbus Defence and Space Germany, but the instruments and components were supplied by contributing institutions across Europe. The noise rejection technical requirements on the interferometer were very stringent, which means that the physical response of the interferometer to changing environmental conditions, such as temperature, must be minimised.

== Spacecraft operations ==
Mission control for LISA Pathfinder was at ESOC in Darmstadt, Germany with science and technology operations controlled from ESAC in Madrid, Spain.

=== Lissajous orbit ===
The spacecraft was first launched by Vega flight VV06 into an elliptical LEO parking orbit. From there it executed a short burn each time perigee was passed, slowly raising the apogee closer to the intended halo orbit around the Earth–Sun L_{1} point.

Animation of LISA Pathfinder 's trajectory

Polar view

Equatorial view

Viewed from the Sun

Earth · LISA Pathfinder

=== Chronology and results ===
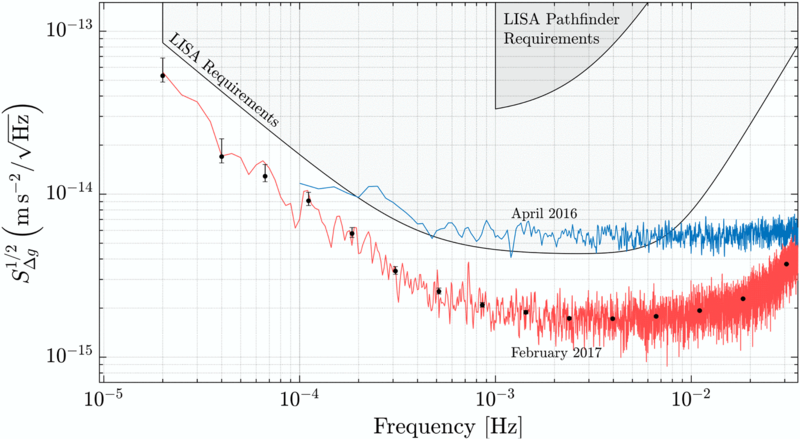
The final results (red line) far exceeded from the initial requirements.

The spacecraft reached its operational location in orbit around the Lagrange point L1 on 22 January 2016, where it underwent payload commissioning. The testing started on 1 March 2016. In April 2016 ESA announced that LISA Pathfinder demonstrated that the LISA mission is feasible.

On 7 June 2016, ESA presented the first results of two months' worth of science operation showing that the technology developed for a space-based gravitational wave observatory was exceeding expectations. The two cubes at the heart of the spacecraft are falling freely through space under the influence of gravity alone, unperturbed by other external forces, to a factor of 5 better than requirements for LISA Pathfinder. In February 2017, BBC News reported that the gravity probe had exceeded its performance goals.

LISA Pathfinder was deactivated on 30 June 2017.

== See also ==
- Einstein Telescope, a European gravitational wave detector
- GEO600, a gravitational wave detector located in Hannover, Germany
- LIGO, a gravitational wave observatory in USA
- Taiji 1, a Chinese technology demonstrator for gravitational wave observation launched in 2019
- Virgo interferometer, an interferometer located close to Pisa, Italy
