= Iodine Satellite =

- Names: iSat
- Mission type: Propulsion technology
- Operator: NASA's Glenn Research Center
- Mission duration: One year

Spacecraft properties
- Spacecraft type: 12U CubeSat
- Manufacturer: Glenn Research Center

Orbital parameters
- Reference system: Geocentric
- Regime: Low Earth

Iodine Satellite (iSat) is a technology demonstration satellite of the CubeSat format that will undergo high changes in velocity (up to 300 meters/second) from a primary propulsion system by using a Hall thruster with iodine as the propellant. It will also change its orbital altitude and demonstrate deorbit capabilities to reduce space junk.

As of 2014 iSat was being developed by NASA's Glenn Research Center, and was initially planned as a secondary payload for launch in mid-2018, but launch was delayed to allow for the propulsion system development to mature. The mission is planned to last one year before deorbit.

== Spacecraft ==
Electrically powered spacecraft propulsion uses electricity, typically from solar panels, to accelerate the propellant and produce thrust. The technology can be scaled up to be used on small satellites up to 450 kg (990 lb). iSat will also demonstrate advanced power management and thermal control capabilities developed for spacecraft of its size.

The satellite is a 12U CubeSat format, with dimensions of about 20 cm × 20 cm × 30 cm. Its solar arrays aim to produce 100 W.

== Propulsion ==
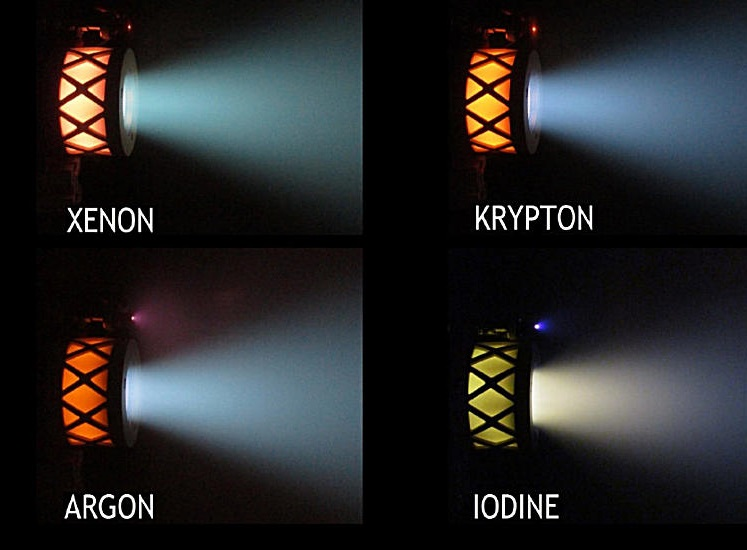
Busek's BIT-3 ion thruster operating on several propellants

The propulsion maturation is a partnership between NASA and the U.S. Air Force. iSat's iodine propulsion system consists of a 200 watt Hall thruster (BHT-200-I) developed by Busek Co, a cathode, a tank to store solid iodine, a power processing unit (PPU) and the feed system to supply the iodine. The cathode technology is planned to enable heaterless cathode conditioning, significantly increasing total system efficiency.

A key advantage to using iodine as a propellant is that it provides a high density times specific impulse, it is three times as fuel efficient as the commonly flown xenon, it may be stored in the tank as an unpressurized solid, and it is not a hazardous propellant. 1U with 5 kg of iodine on a 12U vehicle can provide a change of velocity of 4 km/s ΔV, perform a 20,000km altitude change, 30° inclination change from LEO, or an 80° inclination change from GEO. During operations, the tank is heated to vaporize the propellant. The thruster then ionizes the vapor and accelerates it via magnetic and electrostatic fields, resulting in high specific impulse. The satellite has full three-axis attitude control capability by using momentum wheels and magnetic torque rods to rotate. iSat also counts with a passive thermal control system.

== Mission ==
In the early 2010s, there was an emerging and rapidly growing market for small satellites, although they are often significantly limited by primary propulsion. In 2013, NASA Marshall Space Flight Center competitively selected a project for the maturation of an iodine flight operational feed system. This demonstration flight will address not just propulsion, but the process to integrate commercial off the shelves components as well as custom designed components, opening affordable options of utilizing iodine propulsion systems for national security and for NASA's Discovery class missions.

The iodine thruster will allow iSat to alter its orbital inclination and elevation, opening up a wider range of mission objectives than previously possible with spacecraft of this size, such as transferring from a geosynchronous orbit to geostationary orbit, enter and manage lunar orbits, and be deployed to explore near Earth asteroids, Mars and Venus. As a demonstration, the spacecraft will use its propulsion to lower altitude from its initial orbit of about 600 km to a circular orbit of about 300 km. Then it will perform a plane change maneuver, complete any final operational maneuvers and continue to lower its closest approach to Earth, and de-orbit the spacecraft in less than 90 days following the end of the mission.

== See also ==
- List of spacecraft with electric propulsion
