= 9826 Ehrenfreund =

Asteroid

Discovery
- Discovered by: C. J. van Houten; I. van Houten; T. Gehrels
- Discovery site: Palomar Obs.
- Discovery date: 16 October 1977

Designations
- Named after: Pascale Ehrenfreund (Austrian astrophysicist)
- Alternative designations: 2114 T-3 · 1993 VH_{2}
- Minor planet category: main-belt · Eos

Orbital characteristics
- Epoch 4 September 2017 (JD 2458000.5)
- Uncertainty parameter 0
- Observation arc: 39.66 yr (14,486 days)
- Aphelion: 3.2560 AU
- Perihelion: 2.7308 AU
- Semi-major axis: 2.9934 AU
- Eccentricity: 0.0877
- Orbital period (sidereal): 5.18 yr (1,892 days)
- Mean anomaly: 295.74°
- Mean motion: 0° 11^{m} 25.08^{s} / day
- Inclination: 8.9529°
- Longitude of ascending node: 215.57°
- Argument of perihelion: 112.60°

Physical characteristics
- Dimensions: 6.94 km (calculated); 8.378±0.267 km
- Synodic rotation period: 3.7484±0.0013 h
- Geometric albedo: 0.14 (assumed); 0.191±0.024
- Spectral type: S
- Absolute magnitude (H): 12.8 · 13.096±0.002 (R) · 13.1 · 13.38±0.26 · 13.55

9826 Ehrenfreund, provisional designation 2114 T-3, is a stony Eoan asteroid from the outer region of the asteroid belt, approximately 7 kilometers in diameter.

The asteroid was discovered on 16 October 1977, by Dutch astronomer couple Ingrid and Cornelis van Houten at Leiden, on photographic plates taken by Dutch–American astronomer Tom Gehrels at the Palomar Observatory in California, United States. It was later named for Austrian astrophysicist and biochemist Pascale Ehrenfreund.

== Orbit and classification ==
Ehrenfreund is a member of the Eos family, an orbital group of more than 4,000 asteroids, which are well known for mostly being of stony composition. It orbits the Sun in the outer main-belt at a distance of 2.7–3.3 AU once every 5 years and 2 months (1,892 days). Its orbit has an eccentricity of 0.09 and an inclination of 9° with respect to the ecliptic.

The first used observation was taken at the discovering observatory on 7 October 1977, extending the body's observation arc by just 9 days prior to its official discovery observation.

=== Survey designation ===
The survey designation "T-3" stands for the last of three Palomar–Leiden Trojan surveys, named after the fruitful collaboration of the Palomar and Leiden Observatory in the 1960s and 1970s. Gehrels used Palomar's Samuel Oschin telescope (also known as the 48-inch Schmidt Telescope), and shipped the photographic plates to Ingrid and Cornelis van Houten at Leiden Observatory where astrometry was carried out. The trio are credited with the discovery of several thousand minor planets.

== Physical characteristics ==
Since 221 Eos, the parent of the collisional Eos family, has been characterized as a rare K-type asteroid in the SMASS classification, Ehrenfreund may as well reveal such spectral type.

=== Lightcurves ===
A rotational lightcurve for this asteroid was obtained from photometric observations taken at the U.S. Palomar Transient Factory in August 2013. It gave a rotation period of 3.7484±0.0013 hours with a brightness variation of 0.37 in magnitude (U=2).

=== Diameter and albedo ===
According to the survey carried out by the NEOWISE mission of NASA's Wide-field Infrared Survey Explorer, Ehrenfreund measures 8.4 kilometers in diameter and its surface has an albedo of 0.19, while the Collaborative Asteroid Lightcurve Link assumes an albedo of 0.14 – derived from 221 Eos the family's largest member and namesake – and calculates a diameter of 6.9 kilometers with an absolute magnitude of 13.55.

== Naming ==
This minor planet was named in honour of Austrian astrophysicist and biochemist, Pascale Ehrenfreund (born 1960), who has analyzed dust particles and circumstellar organic molecules on a number of space missions. Ehrenfreund has been the lead investigator at NASA Astrobiology Institute and was elected CEO of the German Aerospace Center in 2015, the first woman to lead a major research facility in Germany. The approved naming citation was published by the Minor Planet Center on 11 November 2000 (M.P.C. 41570).
