= Gerhard Schwehm =

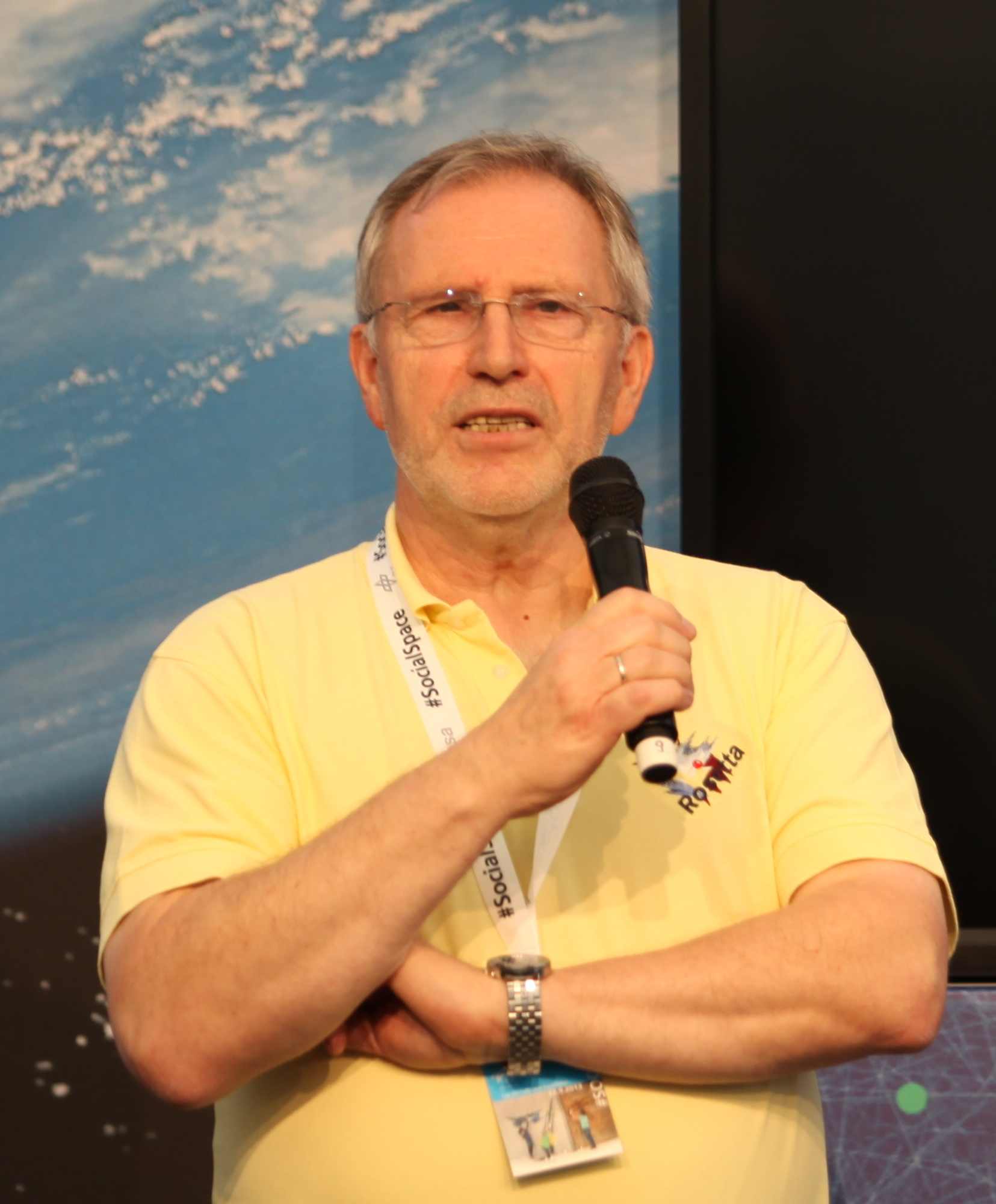
Gerhard Schwehm (2013)

Gerhard Schwehm (born 13 March 1949, Ludwigshafen am Rhein, Germany) is Head of Solar System Science Operations Division for the European Space Agency (ESA). He was Mission Manager for the Rosetta mission until his retirement.

== Education ==
Schwehm gained his PhD in Applied Physics from the Ruhr University, Bochum, Germany.

== Career ==
Schwehm was a scientist at the European Space Operations Centre (ESOC) modelling the dust environment for Halley's Comet. He then became ESA's first planetary scientist, working on the Giotto mission that provided the first close-up images of a comet nucleus, Halley's Comet.

Schwehm became lead scientist on ESA's Rosetta mission in 1985, that culminated in Rosetta looping around the Sun with comet 67P/Churyumov-Gerasimenko in 2014-2015.

Schwehm was mission manager for ESA's Smart-1 mission that impacted the Moon in September 2006 ending three years surveying the Moon.

== Personal life ==
Schwehm is married with five children.
