= Colloid thruster =

Ion thruster subtype

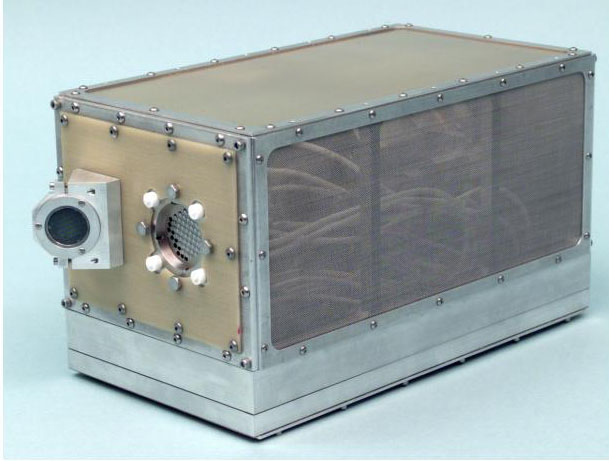
20 μN colloid thruster system.

A colloid thruster (or electrospray thruster) is a type of low thrust electric propulsion rocket engine that uses electrostatic acceleration of charged liquid droplets for propulsion. In a colloid thruster, charged liquid droplets are produced by an electrospray process and then accelerated by a static electric field. The liquid used for this application tends to be a low-volatility ionic liquid.

Like other ion thrusters, its benefits include high efficiency, thrust density, and specific impulse; however it has very low total thrust, on the order of micronewtons. It provides very fine attitude control or efficient acceleration of small spacecraft over long periods of time. Busek asserts its BET-300-P thruster operates with a specific impulse of either 850 seconds or 2300 seconds, depending on how it is configured. In comparison, the high performance NEXT-C gridded ion thruster was used on the DART mission with a specific impulse of over 3100 seconds.

== Flight use ==
Eight electrospray thrusters were first used in space on the NASA ST-7 ESA LISA Pathfinder mission, to demonstrate disturbance reduction. Having logged roughly 1,400 hours on-orbit, the Busek built thrusters system met 100% of their mission goals for the LISA Pathfinder mission.

By the end of April 2015, Busek had developed a smaller electrospray colloid thruster capable of generating 20 mN in a 17.8 x 17.8 x 4.3 cm (7"×7"×1.7") package.

== Experiments ==
In July 2013, scientists from Michigan Technological University and the University of Maryland led by Kurt Terhune demonstrated an electrospray system within a transmission electron microscope (TEM). This led to the discovery that the TEM environment formed needle-like structures on the thruster disrupting the way the electrospray system works.

The LunIR, formerly known as SkyFire, nanosatellite, launched on the 16th of November 2022 as a secondary payload on the maiden flight of the Space Launch System for a lunar flyby, will demonstrate the use of this propulsion system.

== See also ==
- Electrospray ionization
- Ionic liquid
- Ion thrusters
- Taylor cone
