= Busek =

American spacecraft propulsion company

Busek Company Incorporated
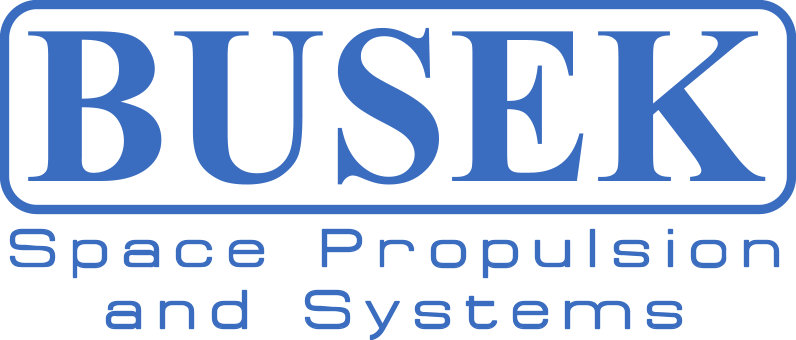

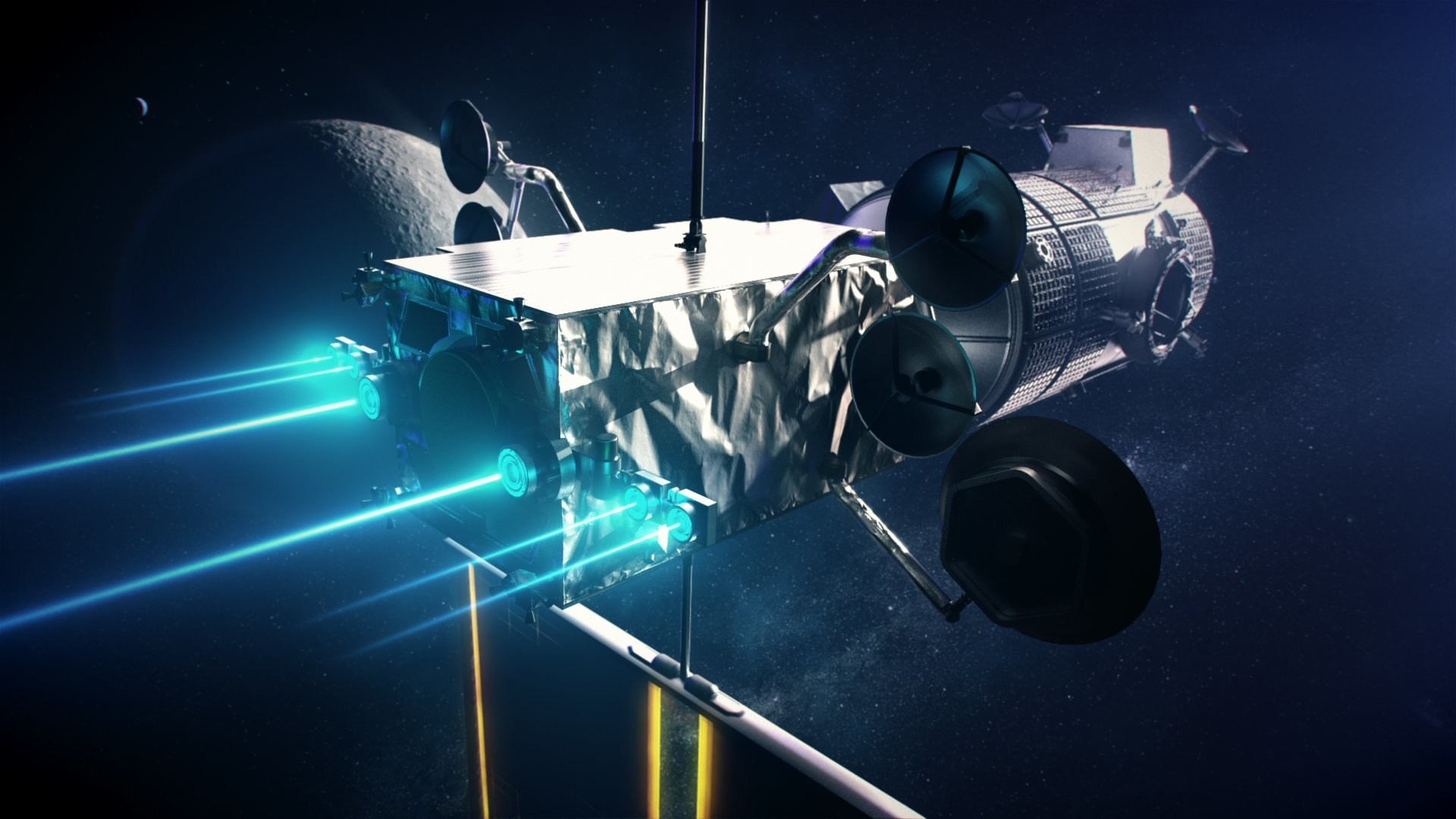
- Concept art of the Lunar Gateways' Power and Propulsion Element with Busek Hall effect thrusters (outer pair on each side)
- Type: Aerospace
- Founded: 1985
- Founder: Vlad Hruby
- Headquarters: Natick, Massachusetts, United States
- Products: Spacecraft propulsion
- Website: www.busek.com

Busek Company Incorporated is an American spacecraft propulsion company that builds thrusters, electronics, and various systems for spacecraft.

== History ==
Busek was founded in 1985 by Vlad Hruby in Natick, Massachusetts. Busek started as a laboratory outside of Boston, Massachusetts.

=== Flight missions ===
==== TacSat-2 ====
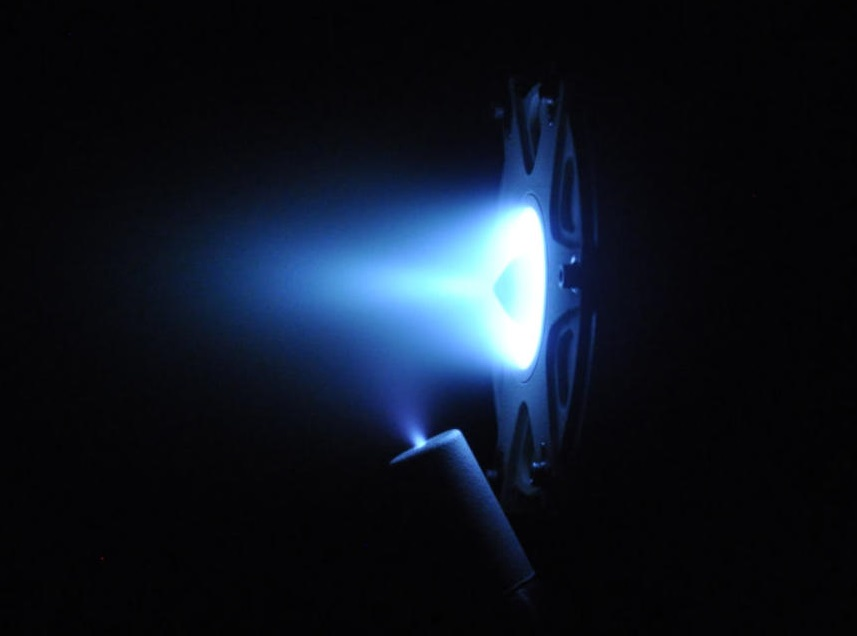
Busek's BHT-200 hall effect thruster

The first US Hall thruster flown in space, Busek's BHT-200, was launched aboard the Air Force Research Laboratory's (AFRL) TacSat-2 satellite. The Busek thruster was part of the Microsatellite Propulsion Integration (MPI) Experiment and was integrated on TacSat-2 under the direction of the DoD Space Test Program. TacSat-2 launched on December 16, 2006 from the NASA Wallops Flight Facility.

==== LISA Pathfinder ====
The first electrospray thruster that made it to space was manufactured by Busek and launched aboard the European Space Agency's LISA Pathfinder satellite on December 3, 2015. The micro-newton colloid-style electric thruster was developed under contract with NASA's Jet Propulsion Laboratory (NASA ST-7 Program) and part of NASA's Disturbance Reduction System (DRS), which serves a critical role in the LISA Pathfinder science mission.

==== AEHF ====
Aerojet, under license with Busek, manufactured the 4 kW Hall thruster (the BPT-4000) which was flown aboard the USAF AEHF communications spacecraft.

==== OneWeb ====
In 2023, Busek announced the successful on-orbit commissioning of its BHT-350 Hall-effect thrusters on 80 OneWeb satellites, launched in December 2022 and January 2023 on SpaceX Falcon 9 rockets. The new OneWeb communications satellites use the thrusters for orbit-raising, station-keeping, collision avoidance and de-orbiting at the conclusion of each satellite’s mission.

== Contracts ==
=== NASA ===
Busek will be providing Hall thrusters for NASA's Artemis Program. As part of the Power and Propulsion Element, Busek's 6 kW Hall thrusters will work in combination with NASA's Advanced Electric Propulsion System to provide orbit-raising and station-keeping capabilities for the Lunar Gateway. The Lunar Gateway's polar near-rectilinear halo orbit (NRHO) will require periodic orbit adjustment, and electric propulsion will use solar energy for this task.

== Research and development ==
=== Propulsion ===
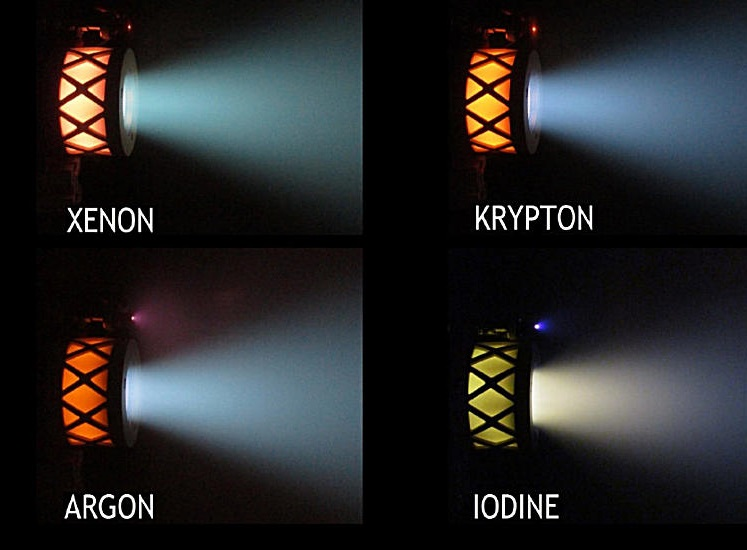
Busek's BIT-3 ion thruster operating on several propellants

Busek has demonstrated experimental xenon Hall thrusters at power levels exceeding 20kW. Busek has also developed Hall thrusters that operate on iodine, bismuth, carbon dioxide, magnesium, zinc, and other substances. An iodine fueled 200 W Busek Hall thruster will fly on NASA's iSat (Iodine Satellite) mission. Busek is also preparing a 600 Watt iodine Hall thruster system for future Discovery Class missions.

Other publicized Busek technologies include RF ion engines and a resistojet rocket. Another focus is CubeSat propulsion, proposed for the 2018 Lunar IceCube mission.

As of July 2012, Busek was working on a DARPA-funded program called DARPA Phoenix, which aimed to recycle some parts of on-orbit spacecraft.

In September 2013, NASA awarded an 18‑month Phase I contract to Busek to develop an experimental concept called a High Aspect Ratio Porous Surface (HARPS) microthruster system for use in tiny CubeSat spacecraft.

In March 2021, Busek and Maxar Technologies completed an end-to-end hot fire test campaign validating the 6-kilowatt solar electric propulsion (SEP) subsystem for the Power and Propulsion Element (PPE) of NASA’s Gateway in lunar orbit.

=== Orbital Debris Remover (ORDER) ===
In order to deal with space debris, Busek proposed in 2014 a remotely controlled vehicle to rendezvous with this debris, capture it, and attach a smaller deorbit satellite to the debris. The remotely controlled vehicle would then drag the debris/smallsat-combination, using a tether, to the desired location. The larger satellite would then tow the debris/smallsat combination to either deorbit or move it to a higher graveyard orbit by means of electric propulsion. The larger satellite, named the Orbital Debris Remover, or ORDER, would carry over 40 SUL (Satellite on an Umbilical Line) deorbit satellites and sufficient propellant for a large number of orbital maneuvers required to effect a 40-satellite debris removal mission over many years. Busek projected the cost for such a space tug to be US$80 million.

== See also ==
- AEHF – Series of American military communications satellites
- FalconSAT-3 – Small satellite project of the United States Air Force Academy
- FalconSAT-5 – Satellite launched in 2010 (USA-221)
- LISA Pathfinder – 2015 European Space Agency spacecraft
- Lunar IceCube – Nanosatellite launched in 2022
- TacSat-2 – US military satellite
- OneWeb – Global communications company
