= Hall-effect thruster =

Type of electric propulsion system

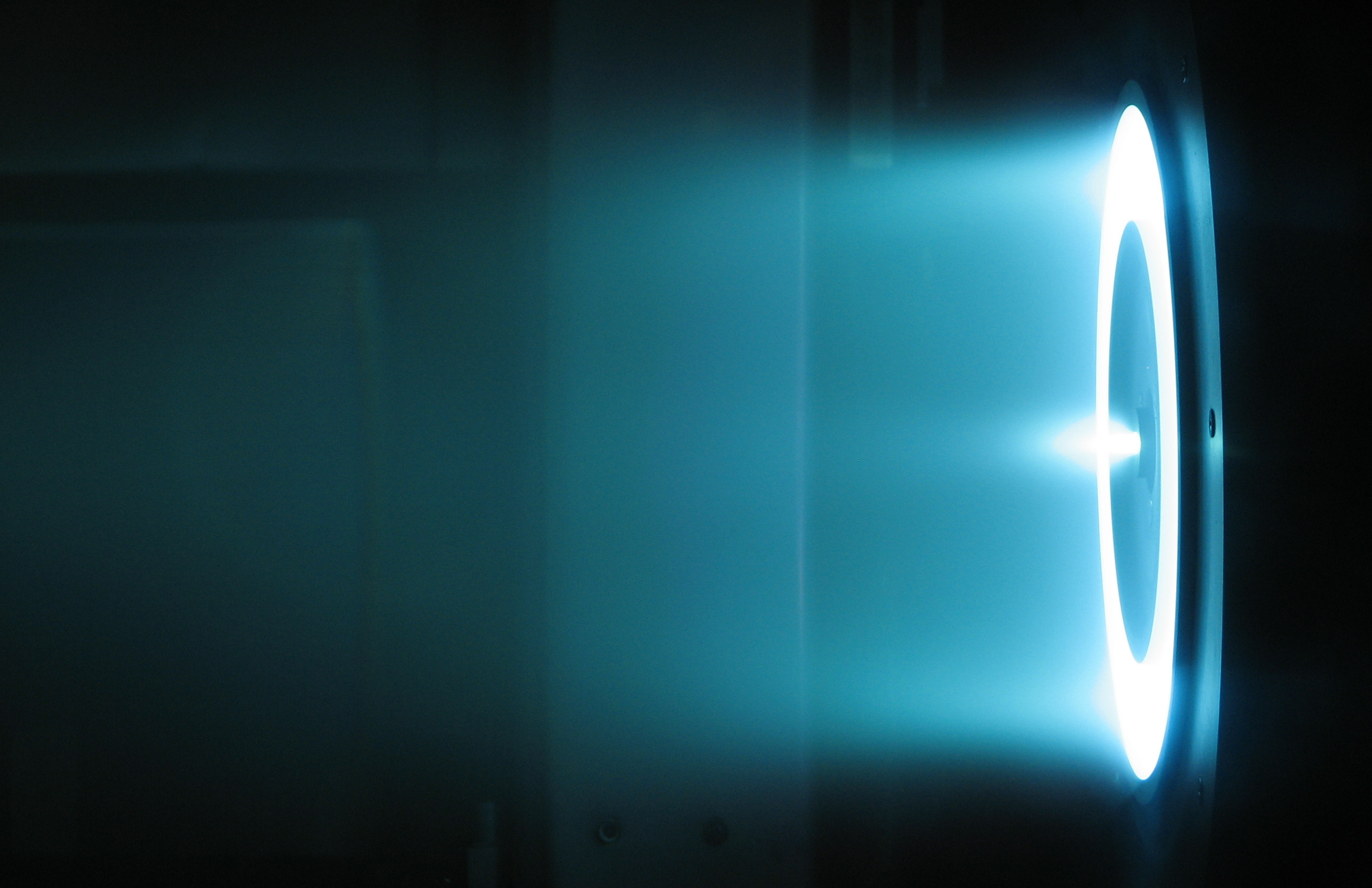
6 kW Hall thruster in operation at the NASA Jet Propulsion Laboratory

In spacecraft propulsion, a Hall-effect thruster (HET, sometimes referred to as a Hall thruster or Hall-current thruster) is a type of ion thruster in which the propellant is accelerated by an electric field. Based on the discovery by Edwin Hall, Hall-effect thrusters use a magnetic field to limit the electrons' axial motion and then use them to ionize propellant, efficiently accelerate the ions to produce thrust, and neutralize the ions in the plume. The Hall-effect thruster is classed as a moderate specific impulse (1,600 s) space propulsion technology and has benefited from considerable theoretical and experimental research since the 1960s.

Hall thrusters operate on a variety of propellants, the most common being xenon and krypton. Other propellants of interest include argon, bismuth, iodine, magnesium, zinc and adamantane.

Hall thrusters are able to accelerate their exhaust to speeds between 10 and 80 km/s (1,000–8,000 s specific impulse), with most models operating between 15 and 30 km/s. The thrust produced depends on the power level. Devices operating at 1.35 kW produce about 83 mN of thrust. High-power models have demonstrated up to 5.4 N in the laboratory. Power levels up to 100 kW have been demonstrated for xenon Hall thrusters.

As of 2009, Hall-effect thrusters ranged in input power levels from 1.35 to 10 kilowatts and had exhaust velocities of 10–50 kilometers per second, with thrust of 40–600 millinewtons and efficiency in the range of 45–60 percent. The applications of Hall-effect thrusters include control of the orientation and position of orbiting satellites and use as a main propulsion engine for medium-size robotic space vehicles.

== History ==
Hall thrusters were studied independently in the United States and the Soviet Union. They were first described publicly in the US in the early 1960s. However, the Hall thruster was first developed into an efficient propulsion device in the Soviet Union. In the US, scientists focused on developing gridded ion thrusters.

=== Soviet designs ===
Two types of Hall thrusters were developed in the Soviet Union:

- thrusters with wide acceleration zone, SPT (Russian: СПД, стационарный плазменный двигатель; English: SPT, Stationary Plasma Thruster) at Design Bureau Fakel
- thrusters with narrow acceleration zone, DAS (Russian: ДАС, двигатель с анодным слоем; English: TAL, Thruster with Anode Layer), at the Central Research Institute for Machine Building (TsNIIMASH).

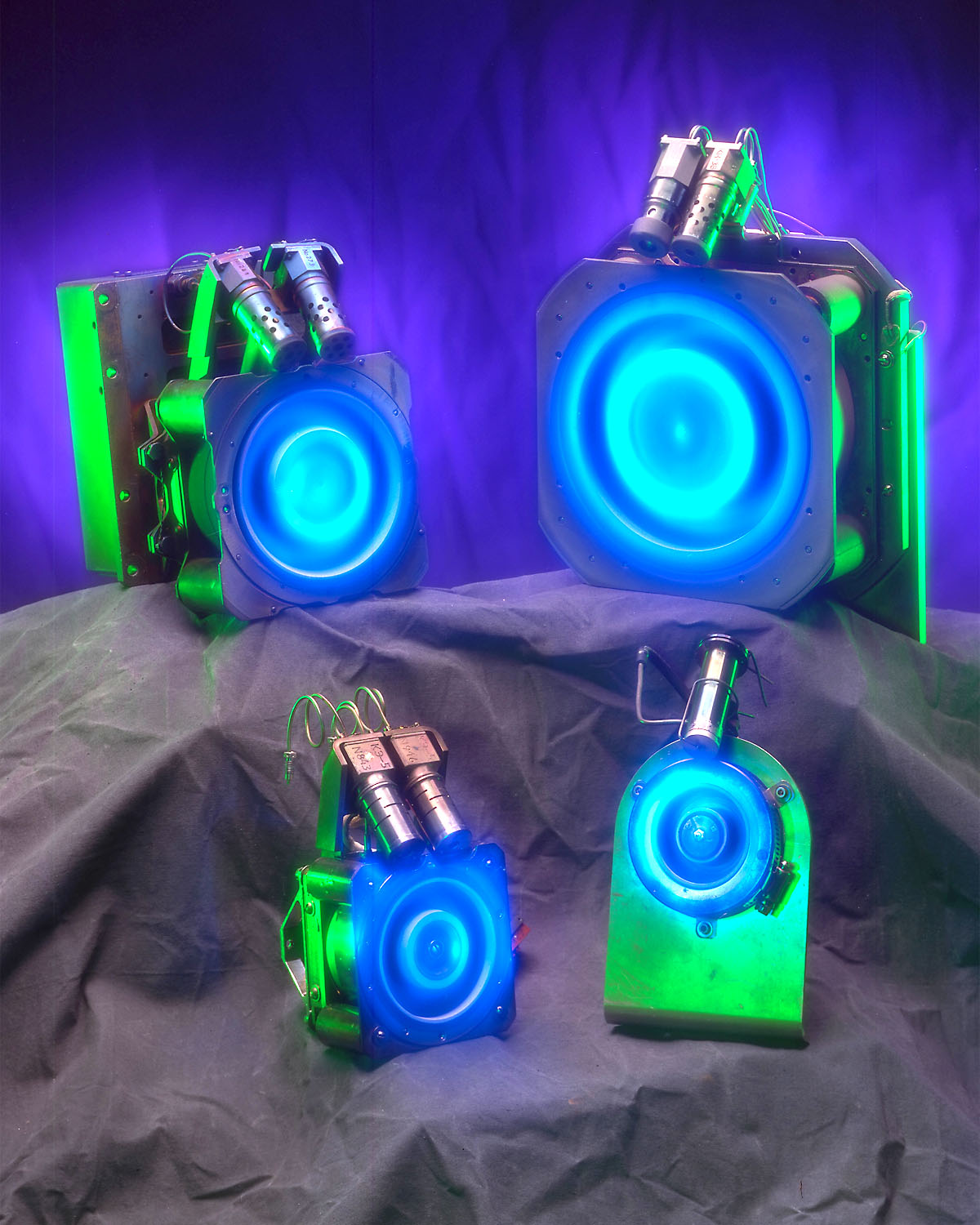
Soviet and Russian SPT thrusters

The SPT design was largely the work of A. I. Morozov. The first SPT to operate in space, an SPT-50 aboard a Soviet Meteor spacecraft, was launched December 1971. They were mainly used for satellite stabilization in north–south and in east–west directions. Since then until the late 1990s 118 SPT engines completed their mission and some 50 continued to be operated. Thrust of the first generation of SPT engines, SPT-50 and SPT-60 was 20 and 30 mN respectively. In 1982, the SPT-70 and SPT-100 were introduced, their thrusts being 40 and 83 mN, respectively. In the post-Soviet Russia high-power (a few kilowatts) SPT-140, SPT-160, SPT-200, T-160, and low-power (less than 500 W) SPT-35 were introduced.

Soviet and Russian TAL-type thrusters include the D-38, D-55, D-80, and D-100.

=== Non-Soviet designs ===
Soviet-built thrusters were introduced to the West in 1992 after a team of electric propulsion specialists from NASA's Jet Propulsion Laboratory, Glenn Research Center, and the Air Force Research Laboratory, under the support of the Ballistic Missile Defense Organization, visited Russian laboratories and experimentally evaluated the SPT-100 (i.e., a 100 mm diameter SPT thruster). Hall thrusters continue to be used on Russian spacecraft and have also flown on European and American spacecraft. Space Systems/Loral, an American commercial satellite manufacturer, now flies Fakel SPT-100's on their GEO communications spacecraft.

Since in the early 1990s, Hall thrusters have been the subject of a large number of research efforts throughout the United States, India, France, Italy, Japan, and Russia (with many smaller efforts scattered in various countries across the globe). Hall thruster research in the US is conducted at several government laboratories, universities and private companies. Government and government funded centers include NASA's Jet Propulsion Laboratory, NASA's Glenn Research Center, the Air Force Research Laboratory (Edwards AFB, California), and The Aerospace Corporation. Universities include the US Air Force Institute of Technology, University of Michigan, Stanford University, The Massachusetts Institute of Technology, Princeton University, Michigan Technological University, and Georgia Tech. In 2023, students at the Olin College of Engineering demonstrated the first undergraduate designed steady-state hall thruster. A considerable amount of development is being conducted in industry, such as IHI Corporation in Japan, Aerojet and Busek in the US, Safran Spacecraft Propulsion in France, LAJP in Ukraine, SITAEL in Italy, and Satrec Initiative in South Korea.

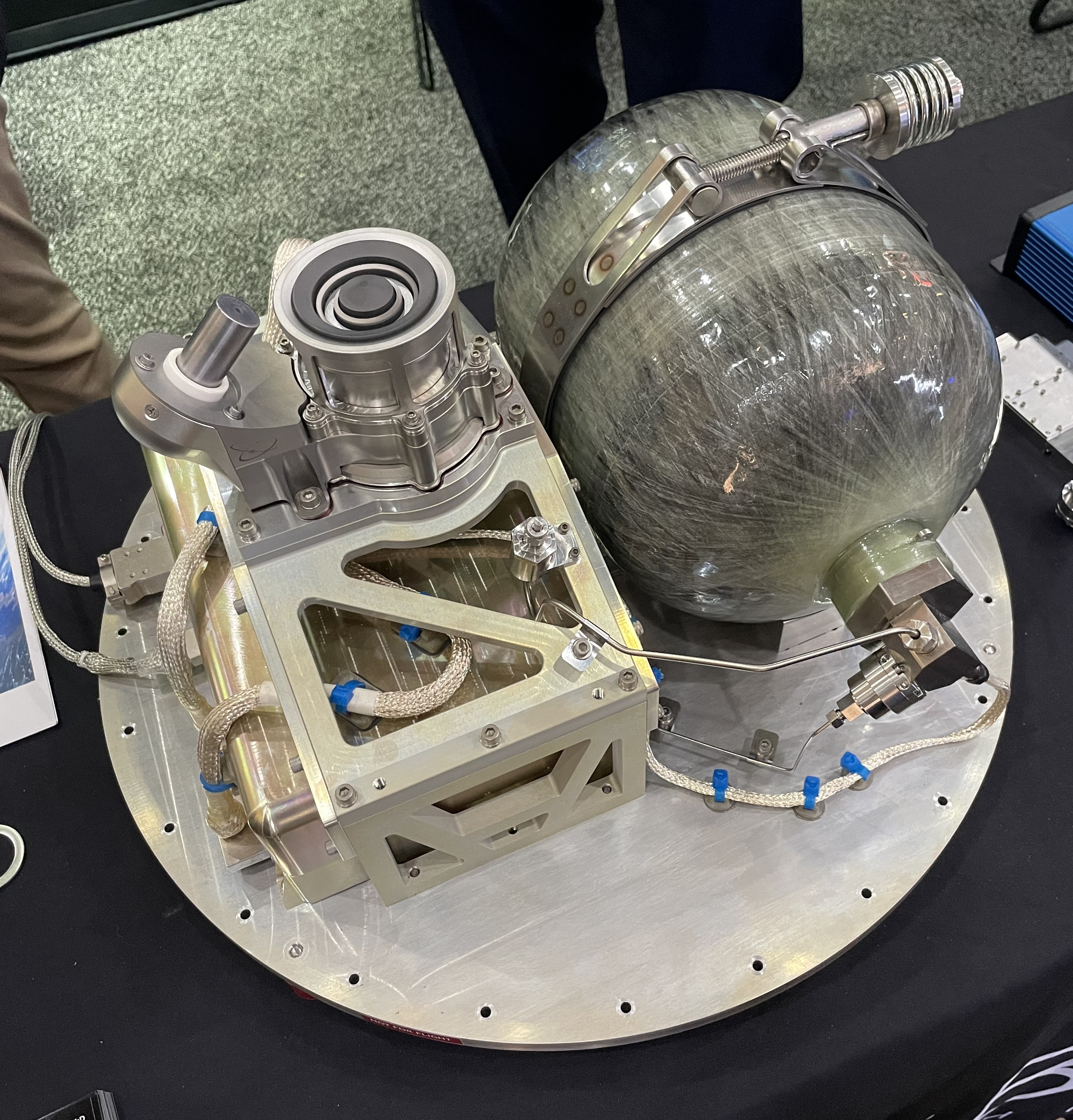
Hall-effect thruster module with propellant tank and control unit visible

The first use of Hall thrusters on lunar orbit was the European Space Agency (ESA) lunar mission SMART-1 in 2003.

Hall thrusters were first demonstrated on a western satellite on the Naval Research Laboratory (NRL) STEX spacecraft, which flew the Russian D-55. The first American Hall thruster to fly in space was the Busek BHT-200 on TacSat-2 technology demonstration spacecraft. The first flight of an American Hall thruster on an operational mission, was the Aerojet BPT-4000, which launched August 2010 on the military Advanced Extremely High Frequency GEO communications satellite. At 4.5 kW, the BPT-4000 is also the highest power Hall thruster ever flown in space. Besides the usual stationkeeping tasks, the BPT-4000 is also providing orbit-raising capability to the spacecraft. The X-37B has been used as a testbed for the Hall thruster for the AEHF satellite series. Several countries worldwide continue efforts to qualify Hall thruster technology for commercial uses. The SpaceX Starlink constellation, the largest satellite constellation in the world, uses Hall-effect thrusters. Starlink initially used krypton gas, but with its V2 satellites swapped to argon due to its cheaper price and widespread availability.

The first deployment of Hall thrusters beyond Earth's sphere of influence was the Psyche spacecraft, launched in 2023 towards the asteroid belt to explore 16 Psyche.

=== Indian designs ===
Research in India is carried out by both public and private research institutes and companies.

In 2010, ISRO used Hall-effect ion propulsion thrusters in GSAT-4 carried by GSLV-D3. It had four xenon powered thrusters for north-south station keeping. Two of them were Russian and the other two were Indian. The Indian thrusters were rated at 13 mN. However, GSLV-D3 did not make it to orbit.

The following year in 2014, ISRO was pursuing development of 75 mN & 250 mN SPT thrusters to be used in its future high power communication satellites. The 75 mN thrusters were put to use aboard the GSAT-9 communication satellite.

By 2021 development of a 300 mN thruster was complete. Alongside it, RF-powered 10 kW plasma engines and krypton based low power electric propulsion were being pursued.

With private firms entering the space domain, Bellatrix Aerospace became the first commercial firm to bring out commercial Hall-effect thrusters. The current model of the thruster uses xenon as propellant. Tests were carried out at the spacecraft propulsion research laboratory in the Indian Institute of Science, Bengaluru. Heaterless cathode technology was used to increase the system's lifespan and redundancy. Bellatrix Aerospace had previously developed the first commercially available microwave electrothermal thruster, for which the company received an order from ISRO. The ARKA-series of HET was launched on PSLV-C55 mission. It was successfully tested on POEM-2.

== Principle of operation ==
The essential working principle of the Hall thruster is that it uses an electrostatic potential to accelerate ions up to high speeds. In a Hall thruster, the attractive negative charge is provided by an electron plasma at the open end of the thruster instead of a grid. A radial magnetic field of about 100–300 G (10–30 mT) is used to confine the electrons, where the combination of the radial magnetic field and axial electric field cause the electrons to drift in azimuth thus forming the Hall current from which the device gets its name.

Hall thruster. Hall thrusters are largely axially symmetric. This is a cross-section containing that axis.

A schematic of a Hall thruster is shown in the adjacent image. An electric potential of between 150 and 800 volts is applied between the anode and cathode.

The central spike forms one pole of an electromagnet and is surrounded by an annular space, and around that is the other pole of the electromagnet, with a radial magnetic field in between.

The propellant, such as xenon gas, is fed through the anode, which has numerous small holes in it to act as a gas distributor. As the neutral xenon atoms diffuse into the channel of the thruster, they are ionized by collisions with circulating high-energy electrons (typically 10–40 eV, or about 10% of the discharge voltage). Most of the xenon atoms are ionized to a net charge of +1, but a noticeable fraction (c. 20%) have +2 net charge.

The xenon ions are then accelerated by the electric field between the anode and the cathode. For discharge voltages of 300 V, the ions reach speeds of around 15 km/s (9.3 mi/s) for a specific impulse of 1,500 s (15 kN·s/kg). Upon exiting, however, the ions pull an equal number of electrons with them, creating a plasma plume with no net charge.

The radial magnetic field is designed to be strong enough to substantially deflect the low-mass electrons, but not the high-mass ions, which have a much larger gyroradius and are hardly impeded. The majority of electrons are thus stuck orbiting in the region of high radial magnetic field near the thruster exit plane, trapped in E×B (axial electric field and radial magnetic field). This orbital rotation of the electrons is a circulating Hall current, and it is from this that the Hall thruster gets its name. Collisions with other particles and walls, as well as plasma instabilities, allow some of the electrons to be freed from the magnetic field, and they drift towards the anode.

About 20–30% of the discharge current is an electron current, which does not produce thrust, thus limiting the energetic efficiency of the thruster; the other 70–80% of the current is in the ions. Because the majority of electrons are trapped in the Hall current, they have a long residence time inside the thruster and are able to ionize almost all of the xenon propellant, allowing mass use of 90–99%. The mass use efficiency of the thruster is thus around 90%, while the discharge current efficiency is around 70%, for a combined thruster efficiency of around 63% (= 90% × 70%). Modern Hall thrusters have achieved efficiencies as high as 75% through advanced designs.

Compared to chemical rockets, the thrust is very small, on the order of 83 mN for a typical thruster operating at 300 V and 1.5 kW. For comparison, the weight of a coin like the U.S. quarter or a 20-cent euro coin is approximately 60 mN. As with all forms of electrically powered spacecraft propulsion, thrust is limited by available power, efficiency, and specific impulse.

However, Hall thrusters operate at the high specific impulses that are typical for electric propulsion. One particular advantage of Hall thrusters, as compared to a gridded ion thruster, is that the generation and acceleration of the ions takes place in a quasi-neutral plasma, so there is no Child-Langmuir charge (space charge) saturated current limitation on the thrust density. This allows much smaller thrusters compared to gridded ion thrusters.

Another advantage is that these thrusters can use a wider variety of propellants supplied to the anode, even oxygen, although something easily ionized is needed at the cathode.

=== Plasma physics ===
The motion of charged particles in a Hall-effect thruster is governed by the Lorentz force:

$$\mathbf{F}=q(\mathbf{E}+\mathbf{v}\times\mathbf{B})$$

where $q$ is the particle charge, $\mathbf{E}$ is the electric field, $\mathbf{v}$ is the particle velocity, and $\mathbf{B}$ is the magnetic field. In a conventional annular Hall thruster, the dominant electric field is approximately axial and the magnetic field is approximately radial. The crossed electric and magnetic fields cause magnetized electrons to undergo an azimuthal E-cross-B drift:

$$\mathbf{v}_{E\times B}=\frac{\mathbf{E}\times\mathbf{B}}{B^2}$$

This drift produces the circulating Hall current from which the thruster gets its name. The degree of electron magnetization is often characterized by the Hall parameter:

$$\Omega_e=\frac{\omega_{ce}}{\nu_e}$$

where $\omega_{ce}=eB/m_e$ is the electron cyclotron frequency and $\nu_e$ is an effective electron collision frequency. Ions are accelerated primarily by the axial electric field. For an ion of mass $m_i$ and charge state $Z$ accelerated through an effective beam voltage $V_b$, energy conservation gives:

$$\frac{1}{2}m_i v_i^2 = ZeV_b \implies v_i=\sqrt{\frac{2ZeV_b}{m_i}}$$

The ideal thrust associated with the ion beam $T \approx \dot{m}_i v_i$, where $\dot{m}_i$ is the ion mass flow rate. In practice, the thrust is reduced by losses such as beam divergence, incomplete propellant utilization, multiply charged ions, wall losses, and electron current that reaches the anode without contributing to thrust.

=== Propellants ===
Hall thrusters commonly use noble-gas propellants because they are chemically inert, can be stored as compressed gases, and do not require vaporization before use. Xenon has traditionally been preferred because its high atomic mass and relatively low ionization energy reduce ionization losses and support efficient thrust production. Lower-cost alternatives, including krypton and argon, have become attractive for large satellite constellations, where propellant price and supply can matter as much as peak thruster efficiency. Mercury has also been used experimentally, as it is heavier than xenon or krypton, cheap, and efficient to store in liquid form.

==== Xenon ====
Xenon has been the typical choice of propellant for many electric propulsion systems, including Hall thrusters. Xenon propellant is used because of its high atomic weight and low ionization potential. Xenon is relatively easy to store, and as a gas at spacecraft operating temperatures does not need to be vaporized before usage, unlike metallic propellants such as bismuth. Xenon's high atomic weight means that the ratio of energy expended for ionization per mass unit is low, leading to a more efficient thruster.

==== Krypton ====
Krypton is another choice of propellant for Hall thrusters. Xenon has an ionization potential of 12.1298 eV, while krypton has an ionization potential of 13.996 eV. This means that thrusters utilizing krypton need to expend a slightly higher energy per mole to ionize, which reduces efficiency. Additionally, krypton is a lighter ion, so the unit mass per ionization energy is further reduced compared to xenon. However, xenon can be more than ten times as expensive as krypton per kilogram, making krypton a more economical choice for building out satellite constellations like that of SpaceX's Starlink V1, whose original Hall thrusters used krypton.

==== Argon ====
SpaceX developed a new thruster that used argon as propellant for their Starlink V2 mini. The new thruster had 2.4 times the thrust and 1.5 times the specific impulse as SpaceX's previous thruster that used krypton. Argon is approximately 100 times less expensive than Krypton and 1000 times less expensive than Xenon.

==== Comparison of noble gases ====
Noble gas properties and cost comparison table
Gas	Symbol	at wt (g/mol)	ionization potential (eV)	unit mass per ionization energy	reference price	cost / m³ (€)	density (g/l)	cost / kg (€)	relative to cheapest
Xenon	Xe	131.29	12.13	10.824	25 € / l	25000	5.894	4241.60	1905
Krypton	Kr	83.798	14.00	5.986	3 € / l	3000	3.749	800.21	359
Argon	Ar	39.95	15.81	2.527	$0.12 / ft³	3.97	1.784	2.23	1
Neon	Ne	20.18	21.64	0.933	€504 / m³	504	0.9002	559.88	251
Helium	He	4.002	24.59	0.163	$7.21 / m³	6.76	0.1786	37.84	17

=== Variants ===
As well as the Soviet SPT and TAL types mentioned above, there are:

==== Cylindrical Hall thrusters ====
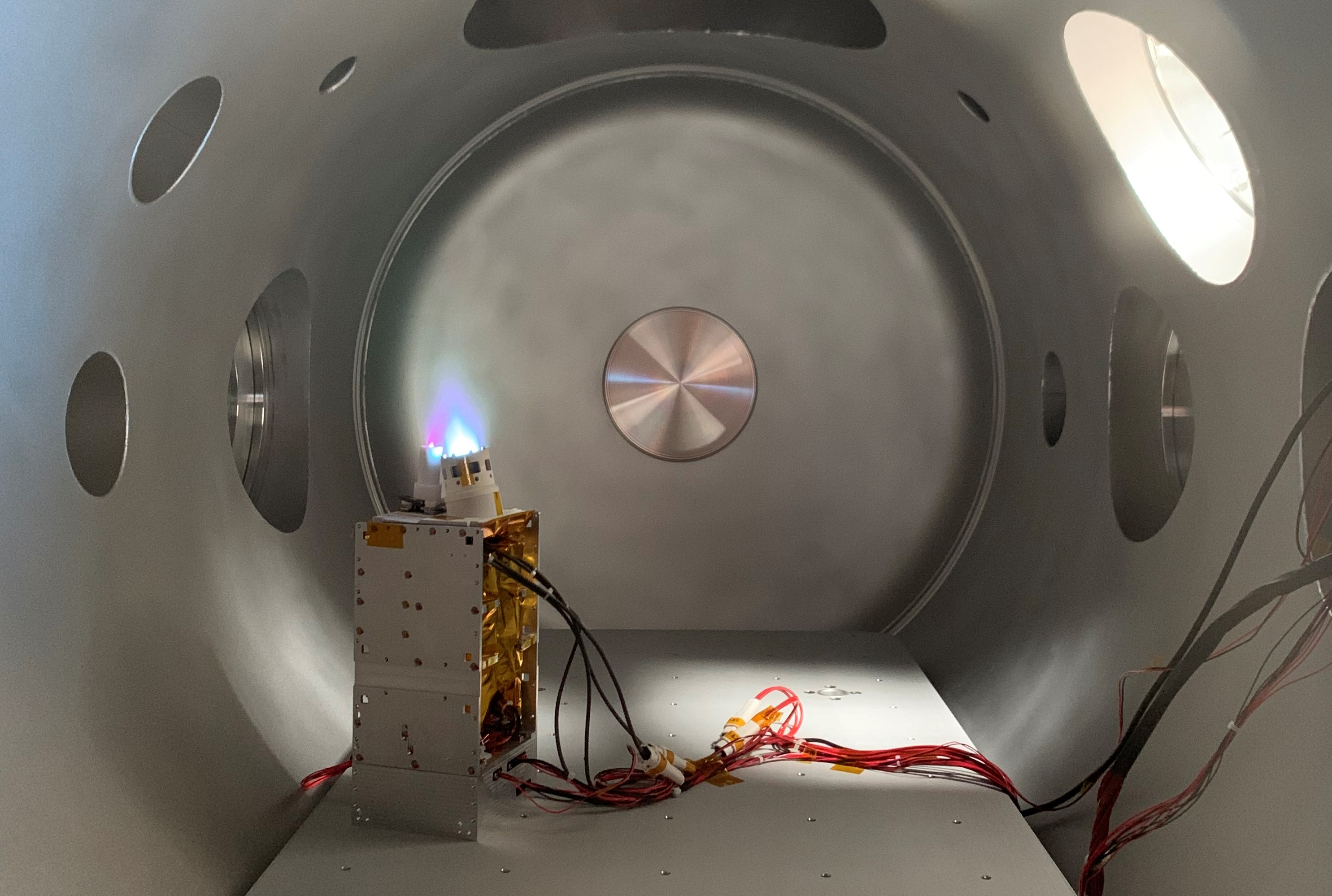
An Exotrail ExoMG – nano (60 W) Hall Effect Thruster firing in a vacuum chamber

Although conventional (annular) Hall thrusters are efficient in the kilowatt power regime, they become inefficient when scaled to small sizes. This is due to the difficulties associated with holding the performance scaling parameters constant while decreasing the channel size and increasing the applied magnetic field strength. This led to the design of the cylindrical Hall thruster. The cylindrical Hall thruster can be more readily scaled to smaller sizes due to its nonconventional discharge-chamber geometry and associated magnetic field profile. The cylindrical Hall thruster more readily lends itself to miniaturization and low-power operation than a conventional (annular) Hall thruster. The primary reason for cylindrical Hall thrusters is that it is difficult to achieve a regular Hall thruster that operates over a broad envelope from c.1 kW down to c. 100 W while maintaining an efficiency of 45–55%.

==== External discharge Hall thruster ====
Sputtering erosion of discharge channel walls and pole pieces that protect the magnetic circuit causes failure of thruster operation. Therefore, annular and cylindrical Hall thrusters have limited lifetime. Although magnetic shielding has been shown to dramatically reduce discharge channel wall erosion, pole piece erosion is still a concern. As an alternative, an unconventional Hall thruster design called external discharge Hall thruster or external discharge plasma thruster (XPT) has been introduced. The external discharge Hall thruster does not possess any discharge channel walls or pole pieces. Plasma discharge is produced and sustained completely in the open space outside the thruster structure, and thus erosion-free operation is achieved.

== Applications ==
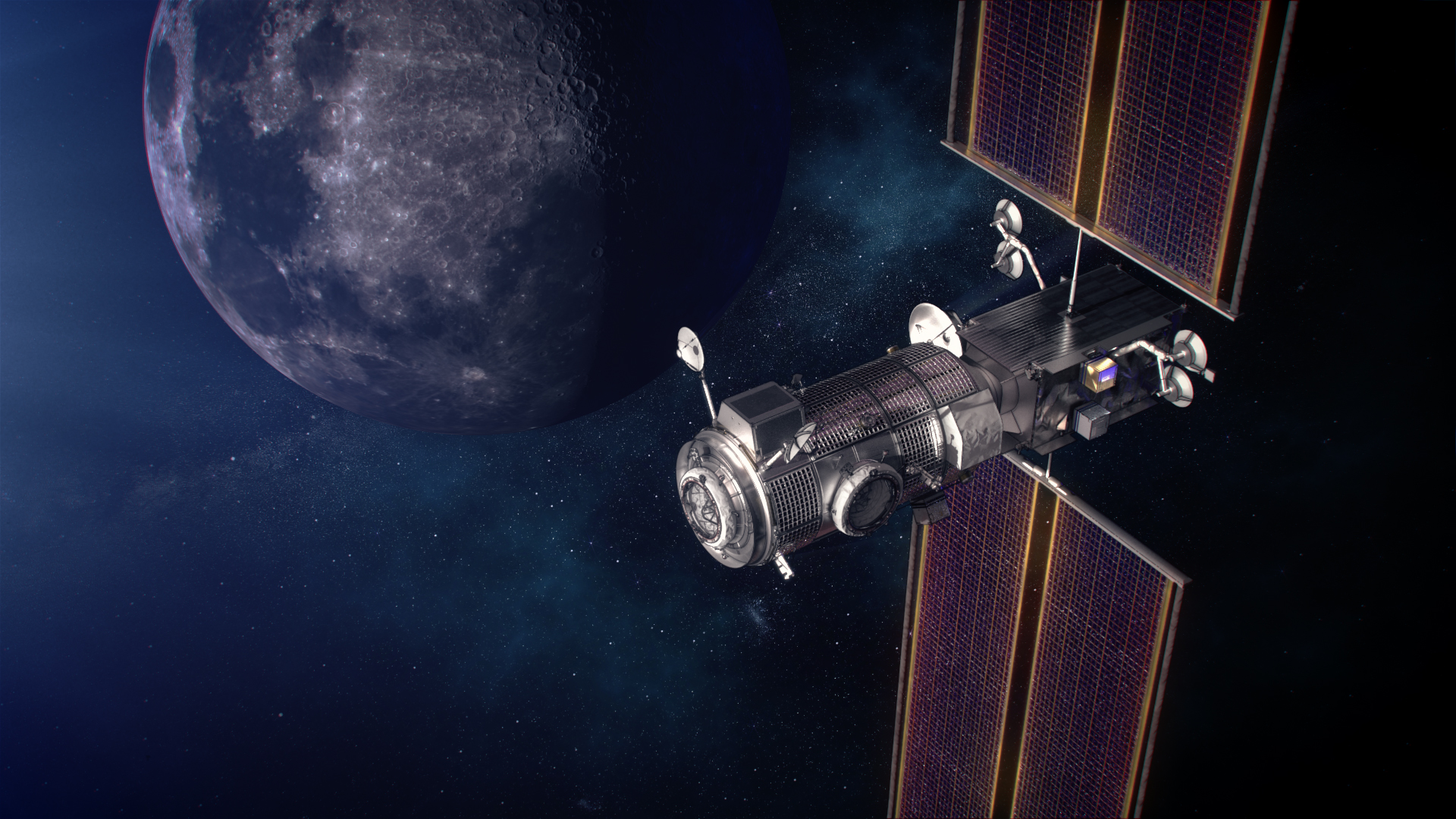
An illustration of the Gateway in orbit around the Moon. The orbit of the Gateway would have been maintained with Hall thrusters.

Hall thrusters have been flying in space since December 1971, when the Soviet Union launched an SPT-50 on a Meteor satellite. Over 240 thrusters have flown in space since that time, with a 100% success rate. Hall thrusters are now routinely flown on commercial LEO and GEO communications satellites, where they are used for orbital insertion and stationkeeping.

The first Hall thruster to fly on a western satellite was a Russian D-55 built by TsNIIMASH, on the NRO's STEX spacecraft, launched on 3 October 1998.

The solar electric propulsion system of the European Space Agency's SMART-1 spacecraft used a Snecma PPS-1350-G Hall thruster. SMART-1 was a technology demonstration mission that orbited the Moon. This use of the PPS-1350-G, starting on 28 September 2003, was the first use of a Hall thruster outside geosynchronous Earth orbit (GEO). Like most Hall thruster propulsion systems used in commercial applications, the Hall thruster on SMART-1 could be throttled over a range of power, specific impulse, and thrust. It has a discharge power range of 0.46–1.19 kW, a specific impulse of 1,100–1,600 s and thrust of 30–70 mN.

Early small satellites of the SpaceX Starlink constellation used krypton Hall thrusters for position-keeping and deorbiting, while later Starlink satellites used argon Hall thrusters.

Tiangong space station is fitted with Hall-effect thrusters. Tianhe core module is propelled by both chemical thrusters and four ion thrusters, which are used to adjust and maintain the station's orbit. Hall-effect thrusters are created with crewed mission safety in mind with effort to prevent erosion and damage caused by the accelerated ion particles. A magnetic field and specially designed ceramic shield was created to repel damaging particles and maintain integrity of the thrusters. According to the Chinese Academy of Sciences, the ion drive used on Tiangong has burned continuously for 8,240 hours without a glitch, indicating their suitability for the Chinese space station's designated 15-year lifespan. This is the world's first Hall thruster on a human-rated mission.

The Jet Propulsion Laboratory (JPL) granted exclusive commercial licensing to Apollo Fusion, led by Mike Cassidy, for its Magnetically Shielded Miniature (MaSMi) Hall thruster technology. In January 2021, Apollo Fusion announced they had secured a contract with York Space Systems for an order of its latest iteration named the "Apollo Constellation Engine".

The NASA mission to the asteroid Psyche utilizes xenon gas Hall thrusters. The electricity comes from the craft's 75 square meter solar panels.

NASA's first Hall thrusters on a human-rated mission were planned to be a combination of 6 kW Hall thrusters provided by Busek and NASA Advanced Electric Propulsion System (AEPS) 12.5 kW Hall thrusters manufactured by Aerojet Rocketdyne, an L3Harris Technologies company. They were intended to serve as the primary propulsion on Maxar's Power and Propulsion Element (PPE) for the cancelled Lunar Gateway under NASA's Artemis program. The high specific impulse of Hall thrusters were supposed to allow for efficient orbit raising and station keep for the Lunar Gateway's polar near-rectilinear halo orbit.

== In development ==
The highest power Hall-effect thruster in development (as of 2021) is the University of Michigan's 100 kW X3 Nested Channel Hall Thruster. The thruster is approximately 80 cm in diameter and weighs 230 kg, and has demonstrated a thrust of 5.4 N.

Other high power thrusters include NASA's 40 kW Advanced Electric Propulsion System (AEPS), meant to propel large-scale science missions and cargo transportation in deep space.
