= Pascale Ehrenfreund =

Austrian astrophysicist (born 1960)

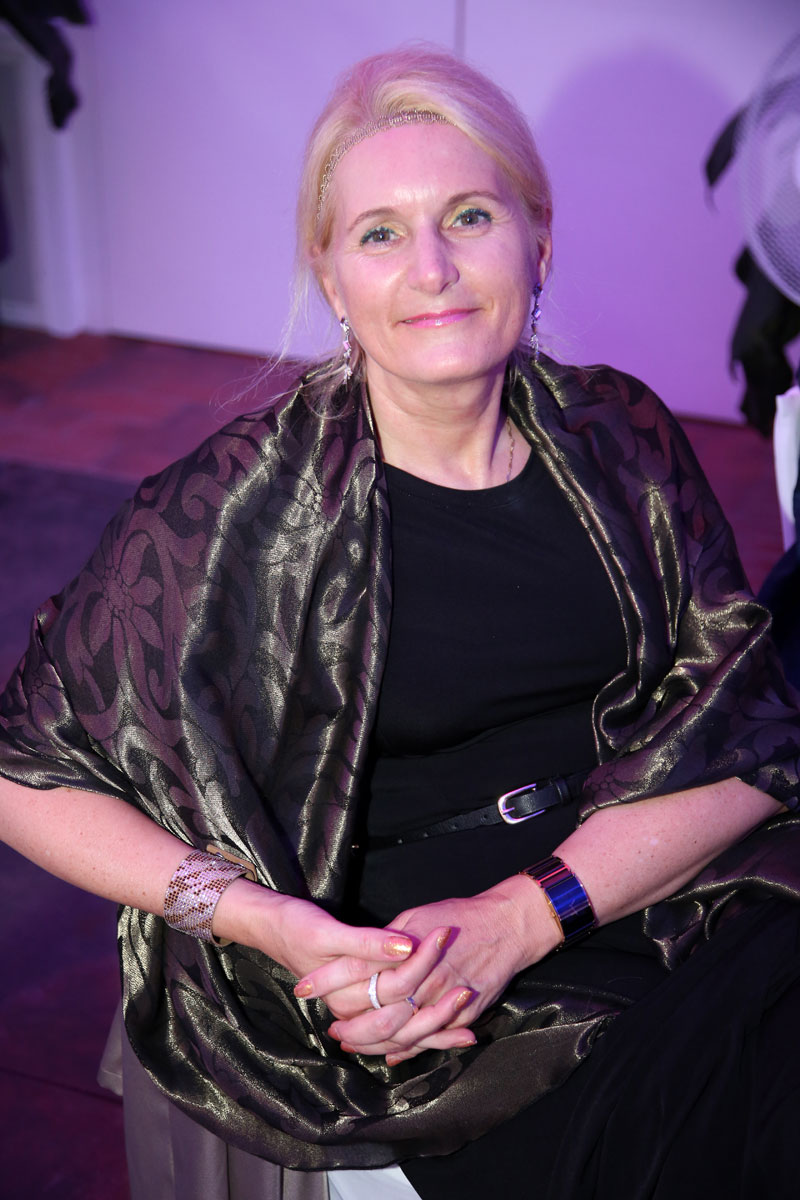
- Ehrenfreund in 2014
- Born: 1960 (age 65–66); Vienna, Austria
- Education: University of Vienna; University of Paris VII; Webster Leiden
- Occupations: CEO of the German Aerospace Center; President of Committee on Space Research; Astrophysicist
- Years active: 1990-present
- Employer(s): Leiden University; University of Amsterdam; George Washington University; Radboud University Nijmegen; Jet Propulsion Laboratory; NASA Astrobiology Institute; Austrian Fund for the Promotion of Scientific Research; German Aerospace Center
- Known for: Asteroid 9826 Ehrenfreund is named in her honor.

Pascale Ehrenfreund (born 1960) is an Austrian astrophysicist. She was the first woman president of the Austrian Science Fund (FWF) and was the CEO of the German Aerospace Center from 2015 to 2020. She was the President of the International Astronautical Federation (IAF) from 2019 to 2022, and president of the ISU from 2021 to 2023. She was elected as COSPAR’s first female president in 2022 and re-elected in 2026.

The main-belt asteroid 9826 Ehrenfreund is named in her honor. Since 2022, she is president of the Committee on Space Research (COSPAR).

== Biography ==
Pascale Ehrenfreund was born in Vienna, Austria, in 1960. She began her university studies at the University of Vienna, where she studied astronomy and biology. She went on to earn a degree in molecular biology at the Institute of Molecular Biology, Salzburg (Austrian Academy of Sciences) in 1988 and then completed her doctorate in astrophysics at the University of Paris VII and the University of Vienna in 1990. Her post-doctorate studies were conducted at the Leiden Observatory as a Fellow of the European Space Agency ESA and later at the Service d'Aeronomie, Verrières-le-Buisson, France, as a Fellow of the French space agency Centre national d'études spatiales (CNES). In 1993, she received the Marie Curie Fellowship by the European Commission. In 1996, she accepted the APART scholarship from the Austrian Academy of Sciences, to prepare her research in astrochemistry for her habilitation Thesis at the University of Vienna. She earned her Habilitation degree on the topic of "Cosmic Dust" in 1999 and in 2008 went on to earn a master's degree in Management and Leadership from Webster University in Leiden, Netherlands.

Beginning in 1999, she worked at the Leiden Observatory and was a professor at both the University of Amsterdam and Leiden University in the Netherlands. She was also a professor at Radboud University Nijmegen, in the Netherlands. In 2001, she became the head of the Astrobiology Laboratory at Leiden and participated as the teamleader, co-investigator and principal investigator in numerous experiments and space missions sponsored by both ESA and NASA. In 2005, Pascale Ehrenfreund came to the United States to work at the Jet Propulsion Laboratory in Pasadena, California as distinguished Visiting Scientist. In 2008, she accepted a position as a research professor and policy expert at the Space Policy Institute of George Washington University (GWU) in Washington, D.C. and as a senior scientist at the NASA Astrobiology Institute. From 2008 - 2012 she was the project scientist of NASA's O/OREOS satellite. Pascale Ehrenfreund has written over 300 scientific research papers, holds an H-index of 81 and published 12 books.

In 2013, she was selected as the first woman to head the Austrian Science Fund (German: Fonds zur Förderung der wissenschaftlichen Forschung) (FWF) (2013-2015).

From 2015-2020, she was the first woman to lead the German Aerospace Center (German: Deutsches Zentrum für Luft- und Raumfahrt e.V.) (DLR).

The main-belt asteroid, 9826 Ehrenfreund was named in her honor.

== Awards ==
- 2018 Honorary Fellow of the Royal Astronomical Society
- 2011 NASA Group Achievement Award for the O/OREOS satellite mission
- 2001 Pastoor-Schmeits Prize for Astronomy
- 2001 New Impulse Grand, Dutch Government
- 1999 Asteroid 9826 Ehrenfreund 2114 T-3
- 1996 APART Prize, Austrian Academy of Science

== Active Memberships in Academies and Committees ==
- 2022- President of COSPAR
- 2021-2023 President of the International Space University
- 2019-2022 President, International Astronautical Federation
- 2016-2019 Vice President, International Astronautical Federation
- 2015- Vice President, Helmholtz Association (Aeronautics-Space-Transportation)
- 2015- Board of Trustees, University Space Research Association USRA, Region III

== See also ==
- List of minor planets named after people

== Bibliography ==
- Schmadel, Lutz D. (2012). Dictionary of Minor Planet Names. New York: Springer Science & Business Media. ISBN 978-3-642-29718-2.
